= WOLF-TV =

Television station in Hazleton, Pennsylvania

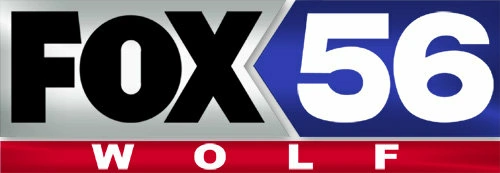
- Hazleton–Wilkes-Barre–; Scranton, Pennsylvania; United States
- City: Hazleton, Pennsylvania
- Channels: Digital: 22 (UHF); Virtual: 56
- Branding: Fox56

Programming
- Affiliations: 56.1: Fox; 56.2: The CW; for others, see § Subchannels

Ownership
- Owner: Sinclair Broadcast Group; (WOLF Licensee, LLC)
- Sister stations: WSWB, WQMY

History
- First air date: June 3, 1985
- Former call signs: WERF (1982–1984, CP); WWLF-TV (1984–1998)
- Former channel numbers: Analog: 56 (UHF, 1985–2009); Digital: 45 (UHF, 2003–2019)
- Former affiliations: Independent (1985–1986)
- Call sign meaning: "Wolf" (the animal)

Technical information
- Licensing authority: FCC
- Facility ID: 73375
- ERP: 220 kW
- HAAT: 510 m (1,673 ft)
- Transmitter coordinates: 41°10′58.2″N 75°52′11.5″W
- Translator(s): 27 (UHF) Waymart; 24 (UHF) Clarks Summit

Links
- Public license information: Public file; LMS
- Website: fox56.com

WOLF-TV (channel 56) is a television station licensed to Hazleton, Pennsylvania, United States, serving Northeastern Pennsylvania as an affiliate of the Fox network. It is owned by Sinclair Broadcast Group alongside WSWB (channel 38), an affiliate of The CW, and WQMY (channel 53), an independent station with MyNetworkTV. The three stations share studios on PA 315 in the Fox Hill section of Plains Township; WOLF-TV's primary transmitter is located at the Penobscot Knob antenna farm near Mountain Top.

The histories of channel 56 in Hazleton and channel 38 in Scranton are closely linked. A consortium of businessmen from New York state filed for both channels, with channel 38 as the main station and channel 56 as a satellite station to reach areas of southern Luzerne County. Channel 38, as WOLF-TV, and channel 56, as WWLF-TV, began broadcasting on June 3, 1985, simulcasting as the market's first modern independent station. In addition to becoming a Fox affiliate in 1986, WOLF-TV offered locally produced children's programming and was the first television station in the U.S. to air a newscast produced by a competing station: WNEP-TV, which began producing a 10 p.m. newscast for WOLF in 1991. A second repeater, WILF (channel 53) in Williamsport, launched in 1992.

In 1993, WOLF-TV's ownership merged into Pegasus Broadcast Television. In 1998, a comprehensive transmitter overhaul plan for the Pegasus stations saw channel 56 move to Penobscot Knob, the primary transmitter site for television in Northeastern Pennsylvania, and become the primary Fox affiliate as WOLF-TV. Channel 38 was split off as an affiliate of The WB under new WSWB call letters and ownership which contracted with Pegasus for programming. The studios moved from Scranton to Plains Township in 2000. After Pegasus was forced into bankruptcy, New Age Media acquired its stations in 2006. New Age changed news providers from WNEP-TV to WBRE-TV at the end of 2009, and in 2014 it sold most of its assets to Sinclair, which operated the New Age stations without owning their licenses for a decade. Under Sinclair, news production was brought in-house, with a local reporting team and anchors based in South Bend, Indiana.

== History ==
=== Early years ===
In November 1980, a group of New York state businessmen led by Peter Rydell filed an application with the Federal Communications Commission (FCC) seeking to build channel 38 at Scranton, Pennsylvania, promising a program lineup of classic reruns and movies. At the time, the market had no conventional independent station, but the region's public station, WVIA-TV (channel 44), devoted a significant portion of its programming to classic movies and series. Among the members of the application group was Syracuse radio manager Craig Fox. The same applicants simultaneously filed for channel 56 at Hazleton, southwest of Scranton, and proposed to build it as a satellite station of the proposed Scranton station. Fox in April 1981 announced that channel 38 would primarily show religious programs and broadcast from a tower on Bald Mountain, already used by WDAU-TV (channel 22). By April 1983, the backers hoped to launch channel 38 in July 1983 using space leased from WDAU, which had just moved to new studios. This deadline was missed, as the studio site had not been chosen. They were also revising their plans for the Hazleton station, given the call sign WERF-TV. They had initially filed for use of the tower of Hazleton radio station WAZL at low power but now sought a high-power facility at Penobscot Knob, a site used by three other local TV stations.

By November 1984, the backers had shifted their plans for channel 38 from a religious station to a secular independent station, in the largest market not then served by one. There had not been an independent in the Scranton area since WTVU (channel 73) in the 1950s. The WOLF-TV call sign was also announced at this time. Initial financing was put together by assembling a limited partnership that sold 30 shares. WOLF-TV on channel 38 and WWLF-TV on channel 56 from Hazleton began broadcasting on June 3, 1985, with a lineup of children's programs, classic reruns, and prime time movies. The station barely made it; the film machine necessary to telecast the five movies on its opening-night lineup was not working five minutes before sign-on. It operated from facilities on Oak Street in Scranton. Cable television systems carried its signal to points as distant as Williamsport, Reading, and Binghamton, New York.

In October 1986, WOLF-TV joined the new Fox network. At this time, it was also building out a local identity. Tom Powell, the first anchorman on and former news director of WDAU-TV, served as an on-air personality and consultant to WOLF; Ron Allen, host of the Sportsline program on WARM, began hosting a weekly television version; and a weekly public affairs program was added. The station also debuted a mascot, a wolf named "Henry the 38th", to make appearances in the area. This was a notable turnabout for WOLF-TV, which had been counseled by its initial public relations firm to avoid animal imagery in its branding. In 1988, WWLF-TV moved from the WAZL tower to a higher-power transmitter facility on Nescopeck Mountain, which was projected to improve the signal to households in southern Luzerne County and points south shaded from WOLF-TV by terrain.

Children's programming was a major emphasis for WOLF-TV in its early years. In 1989, the station introduced a local kids club, the "WOLF Cub Club", and hosted segments in its children's programming. The club, which predated the launch of Fox Kids by a year, attracted 5,000 members in three months, 35,000 by 1992, and 40,000 by 1993—more than the Fox Kids Club in the larger Philadelphia market. Maria Zone, who had hosted the segments, departed in 1993 and was replaced by Scott Topper. Topper also hosted a weekly half-hour local show, Topper's Clubhouse, which aired from 1994 through his departure in 1997. At one point, former WOLF manager Gil Hoban estimated that children's programming brought in 40 percent of the station's revenue.

WOLF-TV began airing a local newscast on January 2, 1991, under an arrangement with WNEP-TV (channel 16), the region's ABC affiliate. Newswatch 16 at 10 was produced at WNEP-TV, sent to WOLF-TV, and transmitted by WOLF; the stations each sold half the advertising time in the program. It largely consisted of similar news items to WNEP's own 11 p.m. newscast because executives at WNEP believed that the 10 p.m. report would serve an older, early-to-bed audience who did not wish to stay up until 11 p.m. for the late news. Newswatch 16 at 10 marked the first time that a local TV station produced a newscast for a competing station in the same market. (Note: Though Newswatch 16 at 10 was the first news share agreement to go to air, it was not the first arrangement to be announced. That was between WRC-TV and WFTY in Washington, D.C., for a newscast that debuted on January 14, 1991.) On December 30, 1992, WILF (channel 53) began broadcasting to Williamsport from a ridge southwest of the city as a second satellite.

The ownership of WOLF-TV and WWLF-TV, Scranton TV Partners, merged with Pegasus Broadcast Television of Radnor, owner of two Fox affiliates in the South, in 1993. The deal was technically a sale, valuing WOLF-TV and WWLF-TV at $12.5 million. Two local partners in Scranton TV Partners remained part of the ownership consortium under Pegasus.

=== 1998 shuffle ===
In 1996, Pegasus proposed to move WWLF-TV to Penobscot Knob, thereby making it comparable to the major Scranton–Wilkes-Barre stations, and move the transmitter used by WWLF to Williamsport to upgrade WILF. This in turn would pave the way for the split of channels 38 and 56 and, because duopolies were not yet permitted by the FCC, the spin-off of one of the two stations to separate ownership, possibly a group that would run the station under a local marketing agreement (LMA). The FCC granted approval to these changes in April 1997. Pegasus planned to move Fox programming to channel 56 exclusively and then sell channels 38 and 53 to another group that would then enter into an LMA with Pegasus to program it as an affiliate of either UPN or The WB, neither of which had a primary affiliation with a full-power station in Northeastern Pennsylvania. WYLN-LP provided WB programming, while WYOU-TV (the former WDAU-TV) was a secondary UPN affiliate. By August 1998, The WB had been selected for the new station, and Pegasus had decided to keep WILF tied to the Fox affiliation.

On November 26, 1998, channel 56 became WOLF-TV and moved to a new tower on Penobscot Knob, jointly built with WNEP-TV. At that time, channel 38 became WSWB, a WB affiliate with an emphasis on the network's children's programming and regional sports coverage. It was sold to KB Prime Media, a partnership of a local stockbroker and original WOLF-TV general manager Guy Turner, and the LMA was traded back to Pegasus. The new WB affiliate supplanted WPIX of New York City and WPHL-TV of Philadelphia on local cable systems.

In 1998, Pegasus renewed its Fox affiliations and committed, under pressure from the network, to produce local newscasts. Though WOLF was desirous to produce its own newscast by late 1999 and end the arrangement with WNEP-TV, it was unable to do so in the Oak Street facility, and Pegasus began looking for a new site along Interstate 81 in Lackawanna County. However, no site in Scranton met its requirements for parking or engineering, and Pegasus instead purchased a 16,000-square-foot (1,500 m^{2}) former car dealership on Route 315 in Plains Township. Between preparations for the move to Plains Township and satisfaction with the existing news arrangement with WNEP-TV, WOLF-TV management dithered on whether to start a news department, even though such an arrangement would give the station the ability to expand into other dayparts and its own identifiable on-air personalities. The company decided against starting a news department and later, on the basis of its financial and ratings success in Pennsylvania, instituted news share agreements across its footprint, including dismantling news departments in Portland, Maine, and Chattanooga, Tennessee.

Another division of Pegasus was involved in reselling DirecTV satellite service in rural areas. In June 2004, DirecTV moved to terminate its contract with Pegasus, prompting subsidiaries of the company to file for Chapter 11 bankruptcy reorganization. All of the company's stations went up for sale. Pegasus attempted to buy WSWB, a deal the FCC stalled, and the bankruptcy trustee assigned the $2.1 million agreement to Mystic Television of Scranton, a firm owned by Daniel J. Duman of Silver Spring, Maryland. In August 2006, the entire Pegasus group was put up for auction, and CP Media of Wilkes-Barre and its subsidiary New Age Media presented the winning bid for the company. WILF obtained the MyNetworkTV affiliation and was split off as its own station, WQMY, that year.

After 19 years, WOLF-TV ended its news production relationship with WNEP-TV at the end of 2009 and began contracting production of its newscast to WBRE-TV (channel 28). The change in news provider meant a format with more connection to Fox's news and entertainment offerings and an expansion to a full hour. WNEP, meanwhile, preferred to move the newscast to its own digital subchannel. The WOLF–WNEP relationship had been a success; in the November 2009 sweeps period, Fox 56 News @10 attracted 12 percent of the audience at that time and 6.5 percent of all households with televisions, figures only surpassed by WNEP's own local newscasts. In December 2011, three bullets pierced the WOLF-TV transmission line, causing the station to leave the air. For a month, transmission capacity for WOLF-TV and a simulcast of WQMY was provided by WBRE-TV and WYOU-TV.

=== Sinclair operation and ownership ===
On September 25, 2013, New Age Media announced that it would sell most of its stations, including WOLF-TV and WQMY, to Sinclair Broadcast Group for $90 million. Concurrently, WSWB was to be sold by MPS Media to Cunningham Broadcasting and continue to be operated by WOLF-TV. On October 31, 2014, New Age Media requested the dismissal of its application to sell WOLF-TV and WQMY; the next day, Sinclair closed on its purchase of the non-license assets of the New Age Media stations. New Age continued to hold the licenses, but Sinclair began operating the stations through a master service agreement.

In October 2016, WOLF-TV began preparing to take its news production in-house. It informed WBRE-TV that it would no longer need its services at the end of 2016 and advertised for job postings ranging from multimedia journalist to meteorologist. The newscast began on January 1, 2017, using local reporting staff and presented from Sinclair's WSBT-TV in South Bend, Indiana. The anchors for WOLF's 10 p.m. news also hosted the 6 and 11 p.m. newscasts for Sinclair's WNWO-TV in Toledo, Ohio.

Sinclair filed on May 28, 2025, to acquire the WOLF-TV and WQMY licenses from New Age Media, which was completed on August 1. On February 24, 2026, Sinclair filed to acquire WSWB, requesting a waiver of ownership rules to own more than two broadcast licenses in the market. It contended that its ability to provide programming and other services to WSWB would be enhanced by direct ownership, citing declining advertising revenues and economies of scale from full integration. The FCC granted such a waiver on April 21, and the sale was completed on May 1.

== Technical information ==
=== Subchannels ===
WOLF-TV's primary transmitter is located on Penobscot Knob, near Mountain Top. Its signal is multiplexed:

Subchannels of WOLF-TV
Subchannel	Res.	Short name	Programming
56.1	720p	FOX	Fox
56.2	480i	CW	The CW (WSWB) in SD
56.3	720p	MyTV	WQMY (Independent with MyNetworkTV) in HD
56.4	480i	Charge!	Charge!
56.5	480i	ROAR	Roar

Simulcast of subchannels of another station

=== Analog-to-digital conversion ===
WOLF-TV and WSWB were among the last Scranton–Wilkes-Barre stations to launch digital signals, which were on the air by November 2003. They were also among the first to cease analog broadcasts. WSWB closed its analog signal in December 2008, and WOLF-TV shut down its analog signal, over UHF channel 56, on January 19, 2009. WOLF-TV's digital signal remained on its pre-transition UHF channel 45, using virtual channel 56. It relocated its signal to channel 22 in 2019 as a result of the 2016 United States wireless spectrum auction.

=== Translators ===
A separately licensed translator and a digital replacement translator provide additional coverage for WOLF-TV.

- W24DB-D Clarks Summit
- WOLF-TV (DRT) 27 Waymart

The Clarks Summit translator became necessary when WOLF-TV moved to Penobscot Knob in 1998. WOLF-TV and the other major Scranton–Wilkes-Barre stations maintain secondary transmitters at Waymart, where the operation of the Waymart Wind Farm interferes with the reception of television signals from Mountain Top. In 2004, the FCC authorized the construction of a tower on Moosic Mountain. FPL Energy (now NextEra Energy Resources), owner of the wind farm, built the facility to provide the signals of the major networks.
