= WQMY =

Television station in Williamsport, Pennsylvania

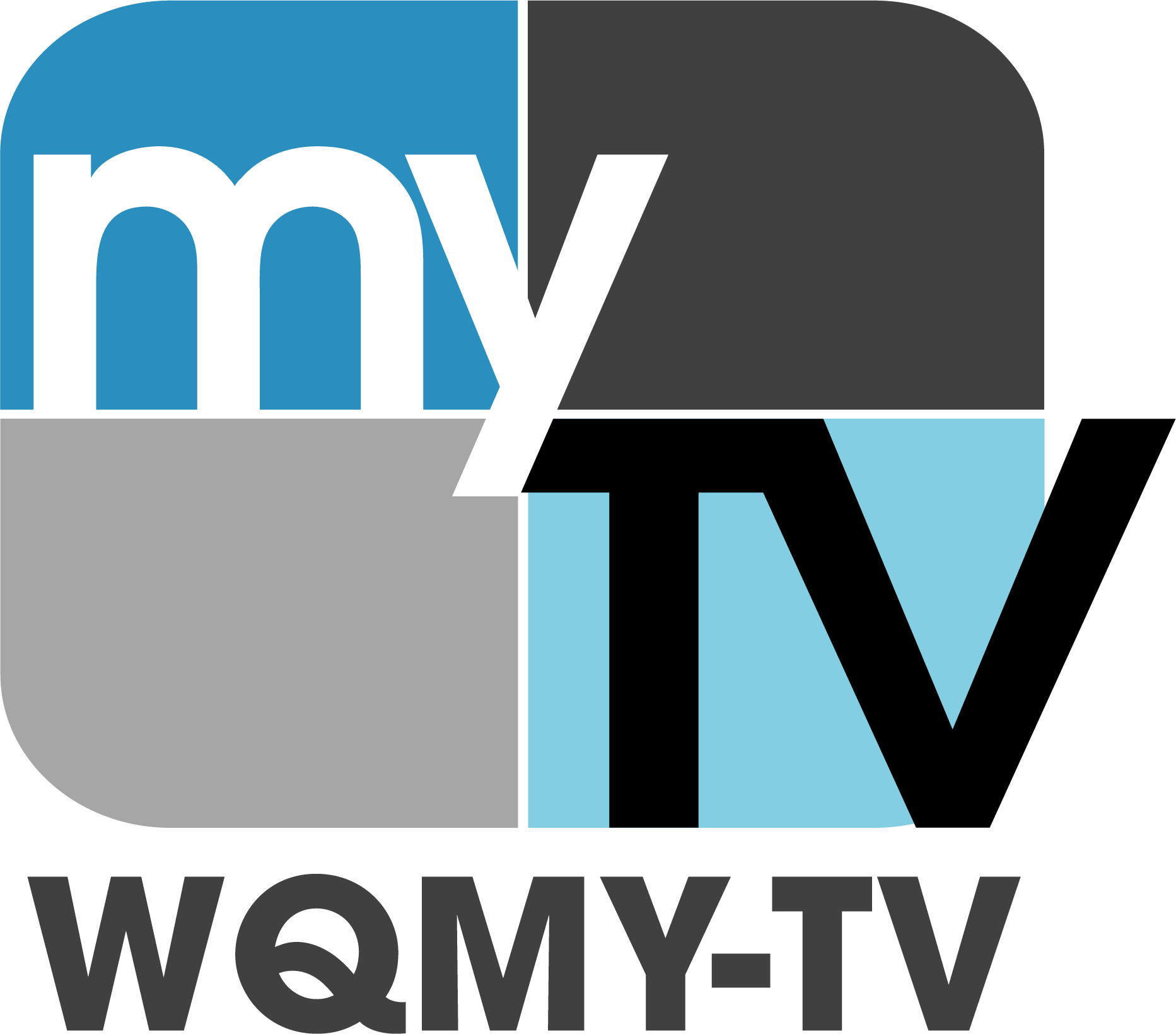
- Williamsport–Scranton–; Wilkes-Barre, Pennsylvania; United States
- City: Williamsport, Pennsylvania
- Channels: Digital: 29 (UHF); Virtual: 53
- Branding: MyTV WQMY

Programming
- Affiliations: 53.1: Independent with MyNetworkTV; 53.2: Fox; 53.3: The CW

Ownership
- Owner: Sinclair Broadcast Group; (WOLF Licensee, LLC)
- Sister stations: WOLF-TV; WSWB

History
- First air date: December 30, 1992
- Former call signs: WDZA (1989–1990); WILF (1990–2006)
- Former channel numbers: Analog: 53 (UHF, 1992–2009)
- Former affiliations: Fox (1992–1998); The WB/UPN (1998–2006)
- Call sign meaning: "MY" reflects its MyNetworkTV affiliation

Technical information
- Licensing authority: FCC
- Facility ID: 52075
- ERP: 50 kW
- HAAT: 243 m (797 ft)
- Transmitter coordinates: 41°12′1.2″N 77°7′11.8″W
- Translator(s): WOLF-TV 56.3 Hazleton

Links
- Public license information: Public file; LMS

WQMY (channel 53) is a television station licensed to Williamsport, Pennsylvania, United States, serving Northeastern Pennsylvania. It is programmed primarily as an independent station, but maintains a secondary affiliation with MyNetworkTV. WQMY is owned by Sinclair Broadcast Group alongside CW affiliate WSWB (channel 38) and Fox affiliate WOLF-TV (channel 56). The three stations share studios on PA 315 in the Fox Hill section of Plains Township; WQMY's transmitter is located on Bald Eagle Mountain. However, newscasts have originated from the facilities of sister station and CBS affiliate WSBT-TV in South Bend, Indiana, since January 2017. There is no separate website for WQMY; instead, it is integrated with that of sister station WOLF-TV.

Although WQMY transmits a digital signal of its own, it does not reach the two major cities in the market, Scranton and Wilkes-Barre. Therefore, the station is simulcast on WOLF-TV's third digital subchannel (56.3) from its transmitter on Penobscot Knob near Mountain Top.

== History ==
=== As a WOLF satellite ===
On December 30, 1992, the station signed on an analog signal on UHF channel 53. It was the second full-time satellite of Fox affiliate WOLF-TV (then on analog UHF channel 38) owned by Scranton TV Partners. Using the call letters WILF, this station was established to improve coverage of its parent station in the northern and western parts of the Scranton/Wilkes-Barre market and serve portions of the Pennsylvania side of the adjacent Binghamton and Elmira markets, which themselves would not receive local Fox affiliates until April 1996 and mid-1997. On November 1, 1998, then-owner Pegasus Television changed channel 38's call letters to the current WSWB and made it the area's second WB affiliate after low-power WYLN-LP in Hazleton dropped the network. Fox programming remained on channel 38's former satellite, WWLF in Hazleton, which picked up the WOLF-TV calls. WILF remained as a repeater of WSWB. WSWB/WILF also picked up UPN as a secondary affiliation. Select programming from the network aired on Saturday nights (since The WB did not offer programs then) without the branding. For the last three years of its affiliation with UPN, the station aired America's Next Top Model in the 8 p.m. timeslot, followed at 9 p.m. by WWE Friday Night SmackDown. Whenever Top Model was in repeats, it would air Veronica Mars instead. All UPN programming in pattern was available on cable via superstation WWOR-TV from New York City (which served Pike County, which is part of the New York DMA) or WPSG from Philadelphia (which served Lehigh and Northampton counties, which are part of the Philadelphia DMA); cable systems in some areas carried WLYH-TV from Harrisburg instead.

Pegasus declared bankruptcy in June 2004 over a dispute with DirecTV, which was co-owned with Fox by News Corporation, over marketing of the satellite service in rural areas. The Pegasus station group was sold in August 2006 to private investment firm CP Media, LLC of Wilkes-Barre for $55.5 million. Eventually, CP Media formed a new broadcasting company, New Age Media. For the first time in its history, WSWB was no longer co-owned with WOLF-TV. However, the new owner entered into a local marketing agreement (LMA) so the stations could continue to be commonly operated.

=== As a MyNetworkTV affiliate; conversion into a separate station ===
On January 24, 2006, the respective parent companies of UPN and The WB, CBS Corporation and the Warner Bros. Entertainment division of Time Warner, announced that they would dissolve the two networks to create The CW Television Network, a joint venture between the two media companies that initially featured programs from its two predecessor networks as well as new series specifically produced for The CW. Subsequently, on February 22, 2006, News Corporation announced the launch of MyNetworkTV, a network operated by Fox Television Stations and its syndication division Twentieth Television that was created to primarily to provide network programming to UPN and WB stations that The CW decided against affiliating based on their local viewership standing in comparison to the outlet that The CW ultimately chose as its charter outlets, giving these stations another option besides converting to a general entertainment independent format.

On May 1, 2006, in an announcement by New Age Media, WILF was named as MyNetworkTV's charter affiliate for the Scranton/Wilkes-Barre market and would sever its simulcast of WSWB to become an independently programmed outlet; concurrently, WSWB was announced as the market's charter CW affiliate, a choice that was made apparent as that station had already maintained affiliations with both The WB and UPN. Since WILF's signal was more or less unviewable in the Scranton/Wilkes-Barre area, it was also announced that its programming would be simulcast over a new third digital subchannel of WOLF-TV. WILF changed its call letters to the current WQMY on July 7 to reflect the upcoming affiliation change. WQMY became a charter affiliate of MyNetworkTV when that network launched on September 5, at which time, the station ceased operating as a full-time WSWB satellite and introduced a separate programming lineup and branding. WSWB became a CW charter affiliate when that network launched two weeks later on September 18. On May 8, 2010, WQMY began re-broadcasting live Philadelphia Union MLS telecasts from ABC affiliate WPVI-TV.

On September 25, 2013, New Age Media announced that it would sell most of its stations, including WQMY and WOLF-TV, to the Sinclair Broadcast Group. On October 31, 2014, New Age Media requested the dismissal of its application to sell WQMY; the next day, Sinclair purchased the non-license assets of the stations it planned to buy from New Age Media and began operating them through a master service agreement.

On May 8, 2017, Sinclair entered into an agreement to acquire Tribune Media, which had operated ABC affiliate WNEP-TV (channel 16) through a services agreement since 2014. It intended to keep WNEP, selling WOLF/WQMY/WSWB and eight other stations to Standard Media Group. The transaction was designated in July 2018 for hearing by an FCC administrative law judge, and Tribune moved to terminate the deal the next month.

On May 28, 2025, Sinclair announced that it would acquire WQMY and WOLF outright. The sale was completed on August 1. On February 24, 2026, Sinclair announced that it would acquire WSWB outright, creating a triopoly with WOLF and WQMY. It requested a waiver of the ownership rules to facilitate this transaction. The sale was completed on May 1.

== Technical information ==
=== Subchannels ===
The station's digital signal is multiplexed:

Subchannels of WQMY
Subchannel	Res.	Short name	Programming
53.1	480i	WQMY DT	Main WQMY programming (4:3)
53.2	720p	WOLF DT	Fox (WOLF-TV)
53.3	480i	WSWB DT	The CW (WSWB) in SD (4:3)

Simulcast of subchannels of another station

WQMY multiplexes its signal in order to broadcast WOLF in HD and WSWB to the Lycoming County area. In mid-2010, WQMY started routing direct HD signals to various cable companies in northeast Pennsylvania.

=== Analog-to-digital conversion ===
WQMY shut down its analog signal, over UHF channel 53, on February 17, 2009, the original target date on which full-power television stations in the United States were to transition from analog to digital broadcasts under federal mandate (which was later pushed back to June 12, 2009). The station's digital signal remained on its pre-transition UHF channel 29, using virtual channel 53.
