= WB38 =

WB38 may refer to the following stations formerly affiliated with The WB Television Network:

- WNOL-TV in New Orleans, Louisiana, now affiliated with The CW Television Network
- WTTA in Tampa St. Petersburg, now affiliated with The CW Television Network
- WOLF-TV and WSWB in Scranton, Pennsylvania, now affiliated with The CW Television Network
