= WNEP-TV =

Television station in Scranton, Pennsylvania

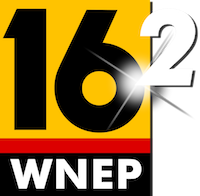
- Scranton–Wilkes-Barre, Pennsylvania; United States
- City: Scranton, Pennsylvania
- Channels: Digital: 21 (UHF), shared with WVIA-TV; Virtual: 16
- Branding: WNEP 16; Newswatch 16; WNEP 16.2

Programming
- Affiliations: 16.1: ABC; 16.2: Antenna TV

Ownership
- Owner: Tegna Inc., a subsidiary of Nexstar Media Group; (Tegna Broadcast Holdings, LLC)
- Sister stations: Nexstar: WBRE-TV, WYOU

History
- First air date: September 15, 1953 (WILK-TV); February 9, 1954 (WARM-TV); October 17, 1957 (current license)
- Former call signs: WILK-TV (1953–1957); WARM-TV (1954–1957)
- Former channel numbers: Analog: 34 (UHF, 1953–1957), 16 (UHF, 1954–2009); Digital: 49 (UHF, 2002–2009), 50 (UHF, 2009–2020)
- Former affiliations: NTA (secondary, 1956–1961)
- Call sign meaning: Northeastern Pennsylvania

Technical information
- Licensing authority: FCC
- Facility ID: 73318
- ERP: 760 kW
- HAAT: 509.2 m (1,671 ft)
- Transmitter coordinates: 41°10′55″N 75°52′16″W
- Translator(s): see § Translators

Links
- Public license information: Public file; LMS
- Website: wnep.com

WNEP-TV (channel 16) is a television station licensed to Scranton, Pennsylvania, United States, serving as the ABC affiliate for Northeastern Pennsylvania. It is owned by the Tegna subsidiary of Nexstar Media Group; Nexstar also owns NBC affiliate WBRE-TV (channel 28) and operates CBS affiliate WYOU (channel 22). WNEP's studios are located on Montage Mountain Road in Moosic; through a channel sharing agreement with PBS member WVIA-TV (channel 44), the two stations transmit using WNEP-TV's spectrum from an antenna at Penobscot Knob near Mountain Top.

WNEP-TV operates a digital replacement translator on UHF channel 22 that is licensed to Waymart with a transmitter in Forest City. It exists because wind turbines run by NextEra Energy Resources at the Waymart Wind Farm interfere with the transmission of full-power television signals.

== History ==
=== WILK-TV and WARM-TV ===
There were originally two ABC network affiliates in northeastern Pennsylvania. WILK-TV, operating on channel 34 and owned by WILK radio took to the air from Wilkes-Barre on September 15, 1953. It was followed by Scranton-licensed WARM-TV, broadcasting on channel 16 and owned by future Governor William Scranton along with WARM radio, in February 9, 1954. During the late 1950s, WILK-TV was also briefly affiliated with the NTA Film Network.

WILK wanted to get a head start on the other local stations when it signed on in 1953, going on the air at 2 p.m. rather than the 3 p.m. sign on that the other stations did. The engineers got the signal ready by noon and decided to take a break. However, at lunch, they turned on the station to inspect their handiwork, only to find the signal was dead. They rushed back and were able to establish the link by 1:50 p.m., 10 minutes before sign-on.

Getting a signal from ABC headquarters in New York City was a challenge in the early days with no access to satellites. As a result, WILK set up a microwave tower in Effort, about 45 miles (72 km) east of Wilkes-Barre. From there, the network signal was bounced to the Penobscot Knob transmitter site. Often, station engineers had to adjust the Effort transmitter to accept a signal from WFIL-TV in Philadelphia if they were unable to receive the New York feed.

WILK-TV and WARM-TV were both losing money, in large part because their network, ABC, was not on an equal footing with NBC and CBS (and would not be until the 1970s). However, they stayed on the air because they were owned by well-respected local radio stations.

=== Merger and transition ===
By 1955, however, it was obvious that Scranton and Wilkes-Barre were going to be a single television market. On October 17, 1957, WILK-TV and WARM-TV agreed to merge into a single ABC station for Northeastern Pennsylvania. The merged station, then as now, operated under WILK-TV's license, but used WARM-TV's channel 16 in order to provide wider signal coverage at less cost—no small consideration given the station's vast and mostly mountainous coverage area. Transcontinent Television Corporation, a Buffalo, New York–based media firm, acquired a 60 percent interest in the merged station; the remaining shares were split between the WARM and WILK groups, with William Scranton as chairman. The merged station, WNEP-TV, was licensed to Scranton, and split operations between WILK-TV's former facility in Wilkes-Barre and a new studio in Scranton. In 1962, WNEP-TV consolidated its operations at a new studio near Wilkes-Barre/Scranton International Airport in Avoca. WILK-TV's transmitter site at Penobscot Knob was retained by WNEP-TV, and the WARM-TV transmitter was donated a decade later to the area's PBS member station, WVIA-TV (channel 44).

Meanwhile, the WILK-TV facility was repurposed as a satellite repeater of WNEP-TV until late summer 1958. The channel 34 assignment was later reallocated to Binghamton, New York, to be occupied by WBJA-TV beginning in 1962.

Despite a power boost to 1.5 million watts, and an increased coverage area—expanded to 15 counties in northeastern Pennsylvania—WNEP-TV bounced back and forth in the ratings for most of the next two decades. It was never able to achieve any consistency because of the bitter rivalry between Scranton and Wilkes-Barre. Viewers in Wilkes-Barre thought it was a Scranton station, while viewers in Scranton thought it was a Wilkes-Barre station. It was also hobbled by being an affiliate of the smallest and weakest network of the time. Indeed, WNEP's launch made Scranton–Wilkes-Barre the smallest market in Pennsylvania with full service from all three networks.

Transcontinent exited broadcasting in 1964 and sold several of its stations, including WNEP-TV, to Taft Broadcasting. When Taft purchased Philadelphia's WIBF-TV in 1969, it sought a waiver to keep both stations. Channel 16's Grade B signal reaches the Lehigh Valley, which is part of the Philadelphia market. WNEP-TV had also operated an outlying translator on channel 7 in Allentown for many years. The Federal Communications Commission (FCC) normally did not allow one company to own two stations with overlapping coverage areas. While it initially granted the waiver, it reversed itself four years later and forced Taft to sell channel 16. A group of WNEP-TV station employees and executives formed NEP Communications, which bought the station from Taft in late 1973.

Soon after NEP took over the station, news director Elden Hale decided to take a regional approach. He billed the station as serving "Northeastern and Central Pennsylvania", and stepped up coverage of the remote portions of the market. These areas had largely been ignored by the other stations in town. He also added the area's first news helicopter. This approach quickly paid off. In November 1976, WNEP surged to first place for the first time in a decade. After briefly falling back to second it returned to number one in 1978, around the same time ABC became the nation's number one network. Apart from a brief period in the mid-1990s when WBRE-TV (channel 28) passed it, WNEP has been number one ever since. NEP also established a remote production company, which operated as an adjunct to WNEP-TV.

The New York Times Company bought the station in 1985. WNEP moved its studios to Moosic in 1989; the facility is similar to the building the Times Company built for then-sister station WHNT-TV in Huntsville, Alabama, but on a larger scale. NEP Communications retained the production unit, which became NEP Broadcasting; the company provided remote broadcast facilities for the Olympics, FIFA World Cup and the Academy Awards, as well as a studio production facility in New York City.

On January 4, 2007, the station, along with the rest of the Times Company's television division, was sold to Oak Hill Capital Partners in a $575 million transaction. Oak Hill formed Local TV as a holding company for its stations.

On July 1, 2013, Local TV announced that its 19 stations would be acquired by the Tribune Company for $2.75 billion. Tribune owned The Morning Call in Allentown; although Allentown is part of the Philadelphia television market, WNEP has long claimed the Lehigh Valley as part of its coverage area. The FCC ruled that Tribune could not keep WNEP due to its ban on newspaper-television cross-ownership within a single market, as The Morning Call served a city within WNEP's coverage area. Tribune spun off WNEP-TV to Dreamcatcher Broadcasting, an unrelated company owned by former Tribune Company executive Ed Wilson. However, Tribune operated the station and provided other services under a shared services agreement, and held an option to buy back WNEP. The sale was completed on December 27. Tribune later announced on July 10, 2013, that it would spin off its newspapers (including The Morning Call) into a separate company, the Tribune Publishing Company, in 2014, pending shareholder and regulatory approval. The split was completed in August 2014.

=== Analog broadcast tower collapse ===
WNEP-TV's transmission tower broadcasting the analog signal on channel 16 collapsed on December 16, 2007, due to severe ice, winds, and snow at the transmitter location on Penobscot Knob. The tower collapse also destroyed the transmitter building. No one was injured during the incident. WCLH's FM antenna and transmitter, which was co-located on WNEP's analog TV tower, was also destroyed during the incident. Transmission of the digital signal on channel 49 was restored after a brief interruption of power to the tower supporting the digital transmitter and antenna. WNEP's signal on local cable systems and satellite was restored later that day. WNEP-TV partially restored its analog over the air TV signal by January 1, 2008 by broadcasting from the nearby American Tower on Penobscot Knob supporting the WNEP-DT antenna as well as WOLF-TV/DT's antenna.

As the WNEP-TV analog broadcast tower collapsed on December 16, 2007, one of the falling guy wires supporting the WNEP-TV tower damaged the neighboring tower broadcasting WVIA-TV (analog and digital) and WVIA-FM by shearing off the top section of the WVIA tower supporting the antenna for the analog and digital TV signals. The antenna for WVIA-FM remained intact, as it is located on the lower section of the shared WVIA-FM-TV tower. The WVIA-TV analog signal on channel 44 was temporarily put off the air until service was restored through a back-up tower on Penobscot Knob. The collapse of WNEP-TV's analog tower also severed power to the transmitters for WYOU (channel 22) and WBRE-TV, putting those stations off the air for a time.

On June 12, 2009, WNEP was to operate on a new tower which had been completed, though the antenna had not arrived in a timely fashion. Their goal was to have the new facility operating by August 2009, but it was delayed a few months. On December 5, 2009, WNEP turned off channel 49 and moved to channel 50. Moving to channel 50 was necessary so it could alleviate possible interference from Telemundo O&O WWSI in Atlantic City, New Jersey, which at the time broadcast on UHF channel 49.

On February 15, 2010, the channel 49 facility was put back into use by WNEP on a temporary basis with FCC approval to accommodate WVIA-TV, which had suffered a partial tower collapse and electrical fire which had destroyed WVIA's transmitter building and the equipment within.

=== Aborted sale to Sinclair Broadcast Group ===
On May 8, 2017, Sinclair Broadcast Group—operator of Fox affiliate WOLF-TV (channel 56), CW affiliate WSWB (channel 38) and MyNetworkTV affiliate WQMY (channel 53)—entered into an agreement to acquire Tribune Media for $3.9 billion, plus the assumption of $2.7 billion in debt held by Tribune. Sinclair CEO Christopher Ripley cited Scranton–Wilkes–Barre as one of three markets, out of fourteen where ownership conflicts exist between the two groups, where the proposed acquisition would likely result in divestitures. To alleviate some of the regulatory issues that the deal incurred by selling certain stations to both independent and affiliated third-party companies, on April 24, 2018, Sinclair announced that it would sell the non-license assets of WOLF-TV, WQMY, and WSWB and the full assets of eight other stations to Standard Media Group (an independent broadcast holding company formed by private equity firm Standard General) for $441.1 million. Sinclair concurrently exercised its option to buy WOLF-TV and WQMY to allow Standard Media Group – the latter of which, for regulatory purposes, would have continued to be licensed as a satellite of WOLF-TV – to acquire the stations outright; Standard would concurrently acquire the WOLF-TV license, which was permitted under FCC ownership regulations as WSWB was not ranked as one of the top-four stations in the market.

On July 18, 2018, the FCC voted to have the Sinclair–Tribune acquisition reviewed by an administrative law judge amid "serious concerns" about Sinclair's forthrightness in its applications to sell certain conflict properties. Three weeks later on August 9, Tribune announced it would terminate the Sinclair deal, intending to seek other M&A opportunities. Tribune also filed a breach of contract lawsuit in the Delaware Chancery Court, alleging that Sinclair engaged in protracted negotiations with the FCC and the U.S. Department of Justice's Antitrust Division over regulatory issues, refused to sell stations in markets where it already had properties, and proposed divestitures to parties with ties to Sinclair executive chair David D. Smith that were rejected or highly subject to rejection to maintain control over stations it was required to sell.

=== Sale to Nexstar Media Group and resale to Tegna Inc. ===
On December 3, 2018, Irving, Texas–based Nexstar Media Group—owner of WBRE-TV and operator of WYOU—announced it would acquire the assets of Tribune Media for $6.4 billion in cash and debt. Nexstar was required to sell either WNEP or both WBRE and WYOU to separate, unrelated companies to address the ownership conflict. On January 31, 2019, Nexstar announced that WNEP, along with WTKR and WGNT in Norfolk, Virginia, would be sold to independent third parties in order to address ownership conflicts involving existing Nexstar properties in both markets. On March 20, 2019, McLean, Virginia–based Tegna Inc. announced it would purchase WNEP from Nexstar upon consummation of the merger, as part of the company's sale of nineteen Nexstar- and Tribune-operated stations to Tegna and the E. W. Scripps Company in separate deals worth $1.32 billion. This made WNEP, along with Harrisburg sister station WPMT, among the first television properties in Pennsylvania for Tegna. The sale was approved by the FCC on September 16, and was completed three days later.

On August 19, 2025, Nexstar announced it would acquire Tegna itself. Unlike when the Nexstar-Tribune deal occurred, the "top four" rule had been struck down in federal court. The transaction was completed on March 19, 2026. A temporary restraining order issued one week later by the U.S. District Court for the Eastern District of California, later escalated to a preliminary injunction, has prevented WNEP from being integrated into WBRE and WYOU.

== Local programming ==
Many of the programs aired on WNEP have been in-house productions rather than syndicated shows. The most popular of these was a children's program called The Land of Hatchy Milatchy. One of the hosts during its long run, Miss Judy (who replaced original host Nancy Berg in the 1960s), would tell children where to find their birthday gift live on the air. The show was the inspiration for a scene in the 18th episode of the second season of the TV series The Office, in which Michael Scott shows footage of him appearing as a child on a show called Fundle Bundle, hosted by "Miss Trudy".

Another program, Uncle Ted's Ghoul School, once employed Bill O'Reilly as a writer. He was also a reporter at the station for a brief period during the mid-1970s. WNEP also served as the local affiliate for the Bowling for Dollars and Dialing for Dollars formats, producing local versions of each.

Today, WNEP produces two in-house programs: Pennsylvania Outdoor Life, a show about hunting and fishing in Pennsylvania, and Home & Backyard, a show about do-it-yourself home improvements, cooking and gardening. Pennsylvania Outdoor Life airs Sundays at 11 a.m. and Home & Backyard airs Saturdays at 10 a.m. on WNEP. The station also participates in several local charity events, including the MDA Labor Day Telethon (which ended in 2014) and Scranton's annual Santa Parade.

=== News operation ===
The station is best known for its local newscasts which are among the highest rated in the United States. It runs their newscasts under the branding of Newswatch 16. WNEP has led the ratings in northeastern Pennsylvania for most of the last 40 years and according to Nielsen data attracts more viewers than the other stations in the market combined. In 2000, the weekday morning program earned shares between 50 and 60 meaning that 50 to 60 percent of televisions in the market were tuned to this station. Their on-air personalities are well known in the area. Chief Meteorologist Tom Clark had been with the station since 1981 and was one of the region's most popular broadcasters. He retired, and his final broadcast was on December 31, 2016. His wife Noreen, who was a meteorologist for the weekend news, had been with the station since 1982. She retired in April 2018. Marisa Burke, a native of nearby Danville, had been with the station since 1984 and solo anchored the noon news and co-anchored the weeknight 6 o'clock newscast with Scott Schaffer. She retired from WNEP on October 28, 2016.

WNEP-TV presently broadcasts 41 hours of locally produced newscasts each week (with 6 1/2 hours each weekday, 4 1/2 hours on Saturdays and four hours on Sundays). Recurring features of news broadcasts include the station's scale model train set in the background of its weather deck and garden and the viewer response segment Talkback 16.

Like most stations at the time, WNEP aired local news at 6 and 11 p.m. It added a noon newscast, titled at first Midday 16, beginning January 12, 1981. A half-hour 5 p.m. newscast was added on September 21, 1987, beating WYOU-TV's 5:30 p.m. "First News" as the earliest evening option for news. It added a 5:30 p.m. newscast on January 15, 2001, and a 7 p.m. newscast in September 2004.

Fox requested most of its affiliates to air local news in 1990. However, area Fox affiliate WOLF-TV (then channel 38) did not have a studio large enough for an in-house news department. To satisfy this, WNEP began producing a nightly 10 o'clock newscast on WOLF-TV in 1991, known as Newswatch 16 at 10 on Fox 38. When the Fox affiliation moved from channel 38 to channel 56, the 10 o'clock news switched stations as well. It then became known as Fox 56 News at 10 with a secondary title of Newswatch 16 at 10 on Fox 56. WNEP aired this broadcast from a secondary set at its studios.

The station runs a secondary service, known as "WNEP 2" (formerly "Newswatch 16 Anytime" and before that "Newswatch 16 on Adelphia 63"), on its second digital subchannel and area cable systems. This channel currently airs Antenna TV programming along with other local programming. WNEP was the only media outlet in the market to utilize a helicopter, known as "Skycam 16", for news gathering purposes. The helicopter was operational from 1984 until being decommissioned in February 2009. The station airs the Pennsylvania Lottery televised nighttime drawings live seven nights a week, Mega Millions drawing Tuesdays and Fridays, and the live Powerball drawing on Wednesdays and Saturdays.

In March 2009, its weekday morning news at 6 added another two hours (7–9 a.m.) seen on WNEP 2. Also in March, the station started up-converting its news programs to 720p widescreen format becoming the first one in the area to make such a change. WNEP announced on August 6, 2009, that they would begin broadcasting a 4 p.m. newscast on September 8, known as Newswatch 16 at 4. In November 2009, after being unable to reach an agreement with WNEP on a contract extension, WOLF announced its intention to turn to WBRE to produce an hour-long 10 p.m. newscast beginning January 1, 2010. WNEP then announced that it would begin a 10 p.m. newscast on WNEP 2 on the same date.

On February 10, 2011, starting with the 4 p.m. newscast, WNEP premiered a new HD-ready set (newscasts remained in widescreen standard definition). On July 9, 2011, WNEP began broadcasting its local newscasts in high definition starting with the 6 p.m. newscast, becoming the first station in the Scranton–Wilkes-Barre market to begin offering local newscasts in high definition. In early September 2011, WNEP expanded its 4 p.m. newscast to a full hour with an additional half-hour at 4:30 p.m.

Since 1994, the station has used as its new theme song an updated version of Al Ham's "Move Closer to Your World", which is composed by Cliff Schwarz. From 1979 to 1994, the station used the original theme, which is currently used by ABC O&O WPVI-TV in Philadelphia. Following its purchase by Tegna, a Change.org petition was started asking viewers to sign the petition to ask Tegna not to drop the song in favor of Tegna's proprietary "C Clarity" theme. On March 4, 2020, the station began using Tegna's standardized news graphics but retained the Schwarz version of "Move Closer to Your World" as its theme as opposed to using "C Clarity", seen somewhat as a compromise.

==== Notable former on-air staff ====
- Frank Andrews – anchor, reporter and news director, 1980–1998
- Bill O'Reilly – reporter, 1975
- Dan Patrick – sports director, 1977–1978

== In popular culture ==
A live interview by WNEP reporter Sofia Ojeda (later with Houston NBC affiliate KPRC-TV) on August 1, 2014, at the Wayne County Fair made a social-media sensation of 5-year-old Noah Ritter. WNEP's video was later "songified" by The Gregory Brothers into the song "Apparently."

John Oliver from HBO's Last Week Tonight with John Oliver mentioned the conflict of viewers over the station's scale model train set in the background of its weather deck and garden (including 'agree/disagree' comments on the station's viewer comment line, which air in the newscasts' Talkback 16 segment). This resulted in the show building a larger-scale train set for the station with the landmarks of Scranton and the surrounding area exaggerated. Though the station accepted it, it proved to be too large for the weather deck/garden, and was donated to Scranton's Electric City Trolley Museum for display beginning in late September 2017, with some modifications (including its tunnel now being presented as Oliver's mouth wide open rather than that of area native P. J. Carlesimo).

== Technical information ==
=== Subchannels ===
Subchannels of WNEP-TV and WVIA-TV
License	Subchannel	Res.	Short name	Programming
WNEP-TV	16.1	720p	WNEP-TV	ABC
WNEP-TV	16.2	480i	WNEP2	Antenna TV
WVIA-TV	44.1	720p	WVIA-HD	PBS
WVIA-TV	44.2	480i	PBSKids	PBS Kids
WVIA-TV	44.3	480i	Create	Create

The station became a charter affiliate of Antenna TV upon its launch on January 1, 2011. The network is carried on digital subchannel 16.2, replacing RTV on that subchannel.

=== Analog-to-digital conversion ===
WNEP-TV shut down its analog signal, over UHF channel 16, on June 12, 2009, the official date on which full-power television stations in the United States transitioned from analog to digital broadcasts under federal mandate. The station's digital signal remained on its pre-transition UHF channel 49, using virtual channel 16.

=== Translators ===
WNEP serves one of the largest coverage areas east of the Mississippi River. This area is very mountainous meaning that some areas cannot get a clear signal from the main transmitter on physical channel 21. As a result, it operates one of the largest translator systems of any station in the Eastern Time Zone.

W20EI-D and W29EU-D are owned by WVIA but broadcast the full WNEP/WVIA multiplex.

- W07DC-D Allentown–Bethlehem (Philadelphia market)
- W14CO-D Clarks Summit
- W29EU-D Clarks Summit
- W20CP-D Mansfield (Elmira, NY market)
- W26CV-D Mansfield (Elmira, NY market)
- W29FQ-D Pottsville
- W10CP-D Towanda
- W15CO-D Towanda
- W20EI-D Towanda
- WNEP-TV (DRT) 26 Waymart
- W20AD-D Williamsport

==== Former translator ====
- W36BE-D State College (Johnstown–Altoona market)
