= WCLH =

- United States
- Broadcast area: Wilkes-Barre/Scranton/Hazleton, PA
- Frequency: 90.7 (MHz)
- Branding: WCLH

Programming
- Format: Alternative rock

Ownership
- Owner: Wilkes University

History
- First air date: June 20, 1973
- Call sign meaning: Wilkes College Listening Habit

Technical information
- Class: A
- ERP: 175 Watts
- Transmitter coordinates: 41.186389°N 75.859167°W

Links
- Webcast: Listen Live
- Website: http://www.wclh.org

WCLH (90.7 FM) is a non-commercial radio station licensed to Wilkes-Barre, Pennsylvania, United States, the station serves the Scranton area. The station is currently owned by Wilkes University. The station has obtained a construction permit from the FCC for a power increase to 205 watts. The station plays alternative rock, heavy metal, and most recently added rap/hip-hop to the programming schedule. It also airs the nationally syndicated shows Democracy Now, Making Contact, CounterSpin, Radio Goethe and The Full Armor of God Broadcast. Like most college radio stations, it is run by a staff of students with the exception of a faculty general manager to oversee the day-to-day operations.

== WCLH / WNEP-TV tower collapse ==
WNEP-TV's transmission tower broadcasting the analog signal on channel 16 and WCLH's FM signal collapsed on December 16, 2007 due to severe ice, winds, and snow at the transmitter location on Penobscot Knob. The tower collapse also destroyed the transmitter building. No one was injured during the incident. The collapse of the tower supporting the antennas for WCLH (FM) and WNEP (analog TV) also damaged the nearby WVIA tower putting WVIA-TV off the air and severed power to the transmitters for WYOU-TV and WBRE-TV putting those stations off the air for a time. WCLH continued to broadcast after the tower collapse through the internet via their "Radio Stream" on their website. WCLH was able to broadcast over the air again after the tower collapse via a low powered signal from a temporary site by the end of December 2007. By December 28, 2007, the WCLH antenna (which survived the tower collapse) and transmitter was moved to a new tower 1 km east, northeast of its former location where it again resumed over the air broadcasting on 90.7 MHz to a significant portion of its original coverage area (see revised service contour map cited below).
