= WVIA =

WVIA could refer to two broadcast stations in the Scranton/Wilkes-Barre, Pennsylvania region of the United States.

- WVIA-TV, a television station broadcasting on channels 44 virtual/ 21 digital.
- WVIA-FM, a radio station broadcasting on 89.9 MHz on the FM band.
