= ABC 32 =

ABC 32 may refer to one of the following television stations in the United States:

== Current ==
- KMOV in St. Louis, Missouri (broadcasts on channel 32.1 of KMOV's broadcast signal)
- WNCF in Montgomery, Alabama

== Former ==
- WBPZ-TV in Lock Haven, Pennsylvania (1958–1959)
- WLKY in Louisville, Kentucky (1961–1990)
