= Perry Sook =

American media executive, born 1958

Perry A. Sook
- Born: 1958 (age 67–68); DuBois, Pennsylvania, US
- Education: Ohio University
- Occupation: Media executive
- Known for: Founder, Chairman and CEO of Nexstar Media Group, 1996–present

Perry A. Sook (born 1958) is an American media executive who founded Nexstar Media Group, one of the largest television and digital media corporations in the United States. He is chairman and CEO of Nexstar and in October 2025, the Nexstar board of directors extended Sook's contract as CEO through March 2029. Sook served as chairman of the joint board of directors of the National Association of Broadcasters from 2023 to 2025 and remains on its executive committee as immediate past chair.

Sook founded Nexstar in 1996, with the acquisition of single local television station, WYOU in Scranton, Pennsylvania. In the decades since, the corporation has grown into the largest owner of television stations in the US, in addition to amassing additional media holdings such as The Hill, American television network The CW, and cable channel NewsNation (the latter relaunched from WGN America, which the company acquired in 2019).

In 2003, Sook took Nexstar public after acquiring Quorum Broadcasting. He subsequently led a project to convince satellite companies to pay for his stations' content, but the cable companies, like Cox Cable did not like the idea. This is referred to as a "retransmission consent dispute." Cox and 21 TV stations in Texas, Arkansas, Louisiana, Kansas and Missouri engaged in a campaign against the idea. As part of their campaign, they published Sook's home phone number in advertisements and encouraged customers to call him. Sook responded in kind and published the home phone number of the general manager of Cox cable. After about a year, Cox agreed to pay for carrying Nexstar's stations' signals. The revenue impact was significant. Sook said in 2020, "We went from a penny a day ... to $2 billion in revenue to [Nexstar] and $18 billion in revenue to local television stations across the country."

Sook's compensation at Nexstar, over $40 million in 2022, made him the highest-paid corporate executive in the Dallas–Fort Worth region. However, in 2018 and 2019, Nexstar shareholders rejected multimillion dollar compensation packages for Sook. The editorial board of Variety named Sook to the 2023 edition of the Variety500, a list of top entertainment industry leaders.

== Early life ==
Sook was born in approximately 1958 in DuBois, Pennsylvania and raised in West Virginia. He completed his undergraduate studies at Ohio University in the Scripps College of Communication.

Sook's first sales job was at a small radio station in Kissimmee, Florida, where the station did not pay him his commission after a big ad sale, which spurred a change to television sales.

Early in his career Sook gained experience in both television and radio broadcasting, working in various roles including sales, on-air talent, and news. He worked at stations in West Virginia, Florida, Ohio, and Pennsylvania.

Before founding Nexstar, Sook was an adjunct professor at Edinboro State University of Pennsylvania and was involved in station ownership and management.

Sook founded Nexstar Media Group in 1996 with the acquisition of WYOU, a local television station in Scranton, Pennsylvania. He has subsequently led the company’s expansion through more than 40 acquisitions.

== Personal life ==
Sook is married to Sandra; they have three children and reside in Flower Mound, Texas. His son, Perry Sook, Jr., is a sports anchor at Nexstar-owned WPIX.

== Politics ==
=== Political contributions ===
Between 2000 and 2018, Sook donated substantial sums to American politicians from both the Republican Party and the Democratic Party, though the majority of his partisan contributions have gone to Republican politicians. His first recorded donation to a federal candidate was $1,000 to Rick Lazio, a candidate for United States Senate from New York who was running against Hillary Clinton. In total, Sook has donated $32,400 directly to the candidate committees of Republican politicians, including Mitt Romney, John McCain, Mitch McConnell, Paul Ryan, John Cornyn, Marsha Blackburn, Roy Blunt, John Boozman, Orrin Hatch, and others. Sook had given another $14,900 cumulatively to related Republican committees, such as the NRCC and the Leadership PACs of Ted Cruz and Liz Cheney. Sook has also donated $5,000 in total to the candidate committees of Democratic politicians, including Chuck Schumer, Mark Pryor, Mark Udall, and Patrick Leahy. His most recent partisan political contribution was a September 2018 contribution to Ted Cruz of $2,700.

Sook has also given heavily to nonpartisan Political action committees (PACs) associated with his business, including $60,000 to Nexstar's PACs and $88,000 to the PACs of the National Associations of Broadcasters.

== Nexstar–Tegna merger ==
In August 2025, Sook announced Nexstar’s agreement to acquire Tegna, Inc.; the acquisition was completed on March 19, 2026, after regulatory approval by the Federal Communications Commission and the U.S. Department of Justice. The acquisition subsequently became the subject of antitrust litigation brought by DirecTV and a coalition of state attorneys general.

A federal judge subsequently issued a preliminary injunction on April 17, 2026, barring Nexstar from integrating with Tegna while the antitrust litigation proceeded. Nexstar said it would appeal the ruling.

The judge found in August 2026 that Nexstar had violated the injunction through its appointment of current and former Nexstar executives, including Sook, on Tegna’s board of directors. The court ordered Nexstar to replace the board and submit regular reports on its compliance.
