= WYOU =

Television station in Scranton, Pennsylvania

- Scranton–Wilkes-Barre, Pennsylvania; United States
- City: Scranton, Pennsylvania
- Channels: Digital: 12 (VHF); Virtual: 22
- Branding: WYOU 22; 28/22 News

Programming
- Affiliations: 22.1: CBS; for others, see § Subchannels

Ownership
- Owner: Mission Broadcasting, Inc.
- Operator: Nexstar Media Group
- Sister stations: WBRE-TV; Tegna: WNEP-TV

History
- First air date: June 7, 1953
- Former call signs: WGBI-TV (1953–1957); WDAU-TV (1957–1986)
- Former channel numbers: Analog: 22 (UHF, 1953–2009); Digital: 13 (VHF, until 2020)
- Former affiliations: UPN (secondary, 1995–1998)
- Call sign meaning: The word "you"

Technical information
- Licensing authority: FCC
- Facility ID: 17010
- ERP: 30 kW
- HAAT: 471 m (1,545 ft)
- Transmitter coordinates: 41°10′58″N 75°52′25″W
- Translator(s): 25 (UHF) Waymart

Links
- Public license information: Public file; LMS
- Website: www.2822news.com

WYOU (channel 22) is a television station licensed to Scranton, Pennsylvania, United States, serving as the CBS affiliate for Northeastern Pennsylvania. It is owned by Mission Broadcasting and operated by Nexstar Media Group along with NBC affiliate WBRE-TV (channel 28); Nexstar's Tegna subsidiary owns ABC affiliate WNEP-TV (channel 16). WYOU and WBRE share studios on South Franklin Street in downtown Wilkes-Barre, with a news bureau and sales office in the Ritz Theater in downtown Scranton. WYOU's transmitter is located at the Penobscot Knob antenna farm near Mountain Top.

Channel 22 was the second television station built in Northeastern Pennsylvania and the first on air in Scranton, beginning broadcasting as WGBI-TV on June 7, 1953. A CBS affiliate from the start, the station was owned by the Megargee family alongside WGBI radio and shared its facilities on Wyoming Avenue. The station changed its call letters to WDAU-TV in 1957, after the Philadelphia Bulletin—owner of WCAU radio and television in Philadelphia—purchased a controlling stake which was later repurchased by the Megargees. In the 1970s, ratings began to slide for the station's newscasts as WNEP-TV catapulted into a dominant first-place position. The station's problems were compounded by a lack of investment during a three-year period in the early 1980s in which the station was forced to relocate to downtown Scranton.

Southeastern Capital Corporation acquired WDAU-TV in 1984 after another acquisition attempt failed. The new owners immediately set out to upgrade the station's outdated equipment and news department, as well as to establish a more regional image for the station. Two years later, Southeastern Capital sold channel 22 to Diversified Communications, which renamed the station WYOU in October 1986. Under Diversified, the news product improved and expanded with new equipment and a news helicopter, and at times the station eclipsed WBRE-TV for second place in local news ratings. In 1996, WYOU was the first station acquired by Nexstar Broadcasting Group, which cut costs by firing several on-air personnel.

When WBRE-TV came up for sale shortly after, Nexstar acquired it and sold WYOU to Mission Broadcasting with a shared services agreement. Some of WYOU's operation, including news production, was integrated with WBRE over the course of 1998, while sales and programming remained separate. Over the 2000s, despite several attempts to change the format and an investment of nearly $1 million a year, WYOU's share of news viewership declined from 7% to 4%. In April 2009, WYOU discontinued its newscasts completely, and the combined operation laid off 14 employees; it aired no news programs for three years until the station began simulcasting newscasts from WBRE in 2012.

== WGBI-TV and WDAU-TV: The Megargee years ==
=== Construction and early operation ===
When the Federal Communications Commission (FCC) ended a multi-year freeze on television channel allocations in 1952, it assigned three channels in the ultra high frequency (UHF) band for use in Scranton: 16, 22, and 73. Scranton Broadcasters, the parent of radio station WGBI (910 AM), had already applied for channel 22 on September 7, 1951, and amended its proposal on June 27, 1952. With no opposition, the construction permit for WGBI-TV was one of the first two awarded for Scranton on August 14, 1952. WGBI announced that the TV station studios would be co-located with the radio station in the basement of what was then the Prudential Life Insurance Building (previously the International Correspondence School) on Wyoming Avenue, with a tower on Bald Mountain. Construction on the Bald Mountain tower began in early November, at which time the owning Megargee family announced the station would be the CBS television affiliate for the Scranton–Wilkes-Barre area. (Note: During this time, the Megargees attempted to sell the construction permit to MCL Telecasting Corporation, which was formed by the Megargees; Comerford Theaters; and the Lynett family, owners of The Scranton Times and radio station WQAN. The latter two parties had jointly applied for channel 16, which instead went to the Union Telecasting Corporation for construction as WARM-TV after they withdrew. The FCC initially rejected the proposal before designating it for hearing. The application was ultimately dismissed. The Lynetts sold the Megargees the television equipment already installed in the fifth floor of the Scranton Times Building.)

WGBI-TV began broadcasting on June 7, 1953. Network programs were received directly from WCBS-TV in New York City by means of a large rhombic antenna at the Bald Mountain transmitter, while the station boasted a large studio for most programs and a secondary news studio in its Wyoming Avenue facility. In addition to newscasts hosted by news director Tom Powell, a newscaster for WGBI radio and the first face seen on the new station, WGBI-TV produced a daily cartoon show and a western performer program in the early evening. It originally broadcast with an effective radiated power of 178,000 watts, which was approved to be increased in 1955. At the time, the Megargees planned to construct satellite stations in Williamsport and Sunbury. Eventually, the link to New York was changed to a private microwave system after reception of the over-the-air signal from WCBS-TV degraded; still later, the station began taking a proper feed from AT&T to broadcast network shows in color.

In July 1956, Scranton Broadcasters began entering into negotiations with WCAU radio and television—the broadcasting stations of the Philadelphia Bulletin newspaper in that city—which sought to purchase the WGBI stations. This resulted in a $650,000 deal for a 50-percent interest and voting control in WGBI-TV, while the Megargees retained full ownership of the radio stations. The deal was approved that October, and channel 22 changed its call sign to WDAU-TV on April 1, 1957, coinciding with the activation of a higher-power, 892,300-watt transmitter facility expected to double the station's service area. The Bulletin's ownership of channel 22 was short-lived. The next year, it sold the WCAU stations in Philadelphia to CBS, retaining its interests in WDAU-TV and a Muzak background music service. The Megargees bought back the newspaper's stake in 1959. Again, the family pursued the possibility of constructing satellite stations of channel 22; in 1960, it proposed to reactivate the silent WBPZ-TV in Lock Haven for the purpose of rebroadcasting channel 22 for the Williamsport area.

=== From dominance to third place ===
For more than two decades, WDAU-TV's news department, headed by Powell, led the news ratings in the Scranton area, while WBRE-TV was the most-watched station in and around Wilkes-Barre. Under Powell, the station provided extensive coverage of local politics and coverage of local and national events including 1957 U.S. Senate hearings into racketeering and the 1959 Knox Mine disaster. Most of the surviving aerial footage of the flooding brought by Hurricane Agnes was shot by channel 22; Powell arranged for the use of a helicopter owned by a coal businessman. WDAU-TV news commanded as much as 48 percent of news viewers in the market in the late 1960s and early 1970s.

This changed when the third-rated station, WNEP-TV (channel 16), began a top-to-bottom overhaul of its news department in the mid-1970s in the mold of the successful Eyewitness News format as used by WABC-TV in New York City. As a result, over a period of several years, channel 16 climbed to the top while channel 22 fell to the bottom in the Northeastern Pennsylvania market. Though only slightly behind WBRE-TV, both stations combined had fewer viewers than channel 16's early evening news, which by 1981 commanded nearly half the audience and in 1984 was the highest-rated early evening newscast in a three-station TV market in the country.

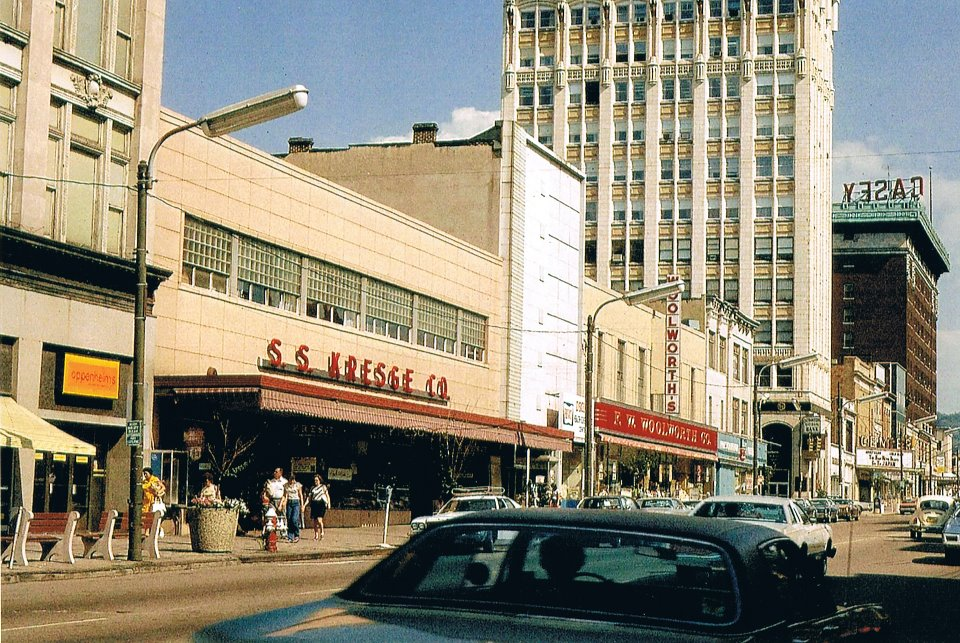
From 1982 to 1999, WDAU-TV/WYOU operated from a downtown Scranton building previously home to an S. S. Kresge Co. department store, as seen in this 1978 image.

Compounding the station's fall was a protracted series of circumstances involving the Megargees' attempts to sell WDAU-TV between 1981 and 1984. That February, the Scranton Preparatory School—which had moved into the Wyoming Avenue building in 1963—gave WGBI and WDAU-TV a year to leave their basement studio so that it could alleviate overcrowding on its campus. Three months later, channel 22 officially went on the market. On September 17, Scranton Broadcasters agreed to sell the station for $12 million to a consortium of Robert Dudley, Charles Woods, and A. Richard Benedek. Under the deal, the new owners would construct a new studio facility for WDAU-TV so it could move out of the Scranton Prep building. The transaction bogged down over the course of 1982 as the Dudley–Woods–Benedek group struggled to raise the cash necessary to make the purchase, requiring extensions of time from the FCC. In the meantime, as a result of the delays, Scranton Broadcasters acquired a former S. S. Kresge department store in the 400 block of Lackawanna Avenue downtown and began refitting it to serve as channel 22's new home. The Dudley–Woods–Benedek transaction hit another snag in November, despite an amended payment plan and FCC approval, due to hesitancy from a bank to put up the money the buyers owed at closing. At the end of 1982, the buyers presented a last-ditch proposal to modify the deal accordingly, which was rejected; the Megargees sued for breach of contract. Litigation involving the buyers, the Bank of New York, and a law firm stretched into 1985, when a judge ruled in favor of the Megargee family.

Philip Lombardo came close to buying the station and engaged in talks throughout 1982 and 1983, but the Megargees instead agreed to sell WDAU-TV to an affiliate of the Atlanta-based Southeastern Capital Corporation, a diversified holding company. The $10.2 million deal, approved in 1984, included a 15-year lease of the studio facility from Scranton Broadcasters.

We stood stagnant, while Channel 16 went crazy.

— Jack Scannella, longtime WDAU-TV/WYOU cameraman, on how the station fell to third place as WNEP-TV surged

The lengthy sale process further deferred investment and attention in the station as its ratings continued to decline. Vacancies were left unfilled so that new managers could make hires; as a result, WDAU-TV had only three full-time reporters on its news staff by February 1984 compared to seven at WBRE-TV and nine at WNEP-TV, and its total news staff had shrunk by a third. The station's equipment was outdated, another matter expected to be handled by new owners. Alarmed by slumping ratings for the CBS Evening News and fearing that WDAU-TV's poor image weighed down its entire lineup of shows, CBS made two overtures to WNEP-TV within 18 months, in 1981 and again in 1983, in hopes of inducing an affiliation switch; channel 16 refused, remaining with ABC.

== Southeastern Capital ownership ==
Southeastern Capital Corporation took control of WDAU-TV on July 26, 1984, and began implementing a series of changes to update the station under general manager Gene Bohi, who arrived in Scranton from WGHP in High Point, North Carolina. These included improvements to the station's picture quality, as well as a new set for the newscasts.

The new ownership led to changes in personnel. Sportscaster Kent Westling was fired the day before the new set debuted. In January 1985, Powell—by this time the news director and editorialist—was fired after more than 31 years and replaced with Larry Stirewalt, who had been WGHP's news director. Debbie Dunleavy, the station's main female anchor, was briefly suspended at the same time for having her hair done without station permission; she published a statement in support of Powell. Powell filed a complaint of age discrimination and reached a settlement with WDAU-TV in April 1986.

WDAU-TV hired Gary Essex, who had been one of the anchormen behind WNEP-TV's rise to number one in the 1970s, away from KUSA in Denver to anchor its newscasts in 1985. The local sales staff was expanded. That fall, the station began drafting plans to move its transmitter from Bald Mountain to Mountain Top to join the other area stations and give WDAU-TV much-needed signal parity with its competitors. Seeking to shed an image as Scranton-centric, it opened a news bureau in Wilkes-Barre, changed its corporate name from Scranton Broadcasters to Keystone Broadcasters, and rolled out an image campaign titled "The Pride of Pennsylvania". News ratings edged up slightly; the Arbitron survey showed WDAU-TV tying WBRE-TV for second place at 6 p.m. Between November 1984 and November 1986, the station increased its audience share for the 6 p.m. news from 10 to 15 percent, tying WBRE-TV but far from the 51-percent share of viewers watching WNEP-TV.

== WYOU: Diversified Communications ownership ==
In June 1986, Southeastern Capital Corporation agreed to sell WDAU-TV to Diversified Communications of Portland, Maine, for $22.5 million. Coinciding with the activation of the new Mountain Top transmitter on Penobscot Knob, the call letters were changed to the current WYOU on October 9. In 1986 and 1987, the station debuted a news helicopter, "Chopper 22"; a satellite newsgathering truck, "SpaceLink 22"; a new news set; a 5:30 p.m. newscast, 1st News; and a 6:30 a.m. morning newscast, News 22 Daybreak. During this time, WYOU began moving ahead of WBRE-TV in early evening news ratings, though channel 28 continued to bounce back at 11 p.m. owing to the strength of NBC's prime time lineup.

Diversified explored selling WYOU and most of its other television stations as early as 1993 and reached a deal with Vision Communications, a firm consisting of Scranton-area investors including channel 22's general manager, to purchase WYOU as well as WPDE-TV in South Carolina and WABI-TV in Maine. When the economic outlook for the television industry improved and revenues rose, Diversified instead opted to retain control of the three stations.

After carrying Star Trek: Voyager, the station added UPN as a secondary affiliation in June 1995. UPN programming ran primarily on weekends. UPN programs moved to the new WQPX-TV (channel 64) in 1998.

== Nexstar ownership and operation ==
He was like a kid at Christmas when he came up to tell me he had the money to buy this station.

— Preston Padden, former Fox and ABC executive, recalling how Perry Sook felt when he bought WYOU

The market for TV stations grew so hot that, by January 1996, Diversified was regularly receiving unsolicited offers of interest in WYOU from other companies. As a result, the company began exploring a potential sale of the station. In June, Diversified announced the sale of WYOU to a new company, Nexstar Broadcasting Group, which would be headquartered in Scranton and led by Pennsylvania native Perry Sook. Sook founded Nexstar with ABRY Partners to buy major network affiliates in midsize markets. It marked his return to broadcast station ownership; he formed Nexstar just days after closing on the sale of two TV stations in Oklahoma and Kentucky to Sinclair Broadcast Group.

Nexstar assumed immediate operational control of WYOU upon the announcement of the sale and instituted a staff shake-up. Three top managers were fired and a fourth departed. In August, citing a cash shortage and overstaffing, Nexstar dismissed three anchors, including Debbie Dunleavy, who had spent nearly 20 years with channel 22; Sook moved the husband-and-wife team of Kevin Daniels and Valerie Amsterdam to anchor the 6 and 11 p.m. newscasts. WYOU unveiled a new logo and graphics and expanded its local morning newscast. The license transfer received FCC approval in late September.

In response to her dismissal, Dunleavy sued Diversified Communications for unjust termination in 1998. The case was settled out of court in 2001.

=== Consolidation with WBRE-TV ===
As Nexstar was making staff changes at WYOU, WBRE-TV—the second-rated station in Northeastern Pennsylvania—was reluctantly put on the market. A group of limited partners successfully forced the managing partner in WBRE-TV's owner, Northeastern Television Limited Partners, to offer channel 28 for sale so they could receive a return on their investment. Officials from ABRY Partners—Nexstar's capital backer—as well as Sook toured WBRE-TV. In April 1997, Northeastern Television announced the $47 million sale of WBRE-TV to Nexstar. At the time, duopolies were not permitted, so Nexstar opted to sell WYOU to Bastet Broadcasting of Columbus, Ohio. Bastet, in turn, would enter into a shared services agreement (SSA) with Nexstar. Under the SSA, the stations could pool many operating functions and save on costs. Bastet was a sister company to Mission Broadcasting, which owned UPN affiliates in Greensboro, North Carolina, and Nashville, Tennessee; both stations were run by other local broadcasters through local marketing agreements.

The sale closed in December 1997 and became effective on January 5, 1998, leading the way for work to begin on the shared services plan between the two stations. The only departments that would not be shared were sales, programming, and accounting. Eight WYOU employees lost their jobs in May 1998 as the news operation moved from Scranton to Wilkes-Barre, where both stations would be overseen by the WBRE-TV news director. Shortly after the move, in July, the WYOU newscasts were rebranded as ActioNews, with a faster-paced format and emphasis on stories over reporters. Frank Andrews, a former WNEP-TV anchor, was hired to anchor WYOU's evening newscasts in January 1999.

Nexstar and Bastet considered consolidating WBRE and WYOU's advertising sales operations by way of a joint sales agreement in 1999. In May, the U.S. Department of Justice initiated an investigation of the stations' operations and those of other local media in response to the proposal and to a similar plan by the companies to consolidate the ad sales of two TV stations in Wichita Falls, Texas. Citing the resources needed to respond to the Department of Justice, the companies abandoned the plan in July. At the end of 1999, WYOU vacated 415 Lackawanna Avenue and moved its sales and programming offices, as well as a Scranton news bureau for the WBRE–WYOU news operation, next door to smaller space on the third floor of the Oppenheim Building at 409 Lackawanna. (Note: 415 Lackawanna was then demolished to make way for a new headquarters for regional energy company Southern Union.)

The arrangement failed to create the improvements that were sought. In May 2000, WBRE-TV had 18 percent of the early evening news audience and WYOU another 7 percent; WNEP-TV commanded 42 percent. In 2000, Nexstar shifted to differentiating WBRE and WYOU by their regional focus; the former emphasized Luzerne County and Wilkes-Barre, while the latter emphasized Lackawanna County and Scranton. Two years later, the stations debuted combined morning and midday newscasts, Pennsylvania Morning and Pennsylvania Midday, presented by a mix of WBRE and WYOU personnel; evening newscasts remained separate. In 2003, Nexstar split oversight of news for the two stations and elevated Andrews to the role of news director for WYOU; Andrews left WYOU in March 2006 while preparing a run for the Pennsylvania House of Representatives. He won election that November, using his on-air and real last names as Frank Andrews Shimkus.

In 2006, WYOU revamped its evening newscasts again, this time adopting an interactive format incorporating viewer emails and phone calls, as well as contributions from local weather spotters. Candice Grossklaus, previously the weekend anchor for WBRE, was teamed with Eric Scheiner, who came from a similar nontraditional newscast at WNDS-TV in Derry, New Hampshire. The new newscasts eschewed regular sports coverage on weeknights. The shared Pennsylvania Morning and Pennsylvania Midday shows were discontinued in January 2008; on WYOU, this resulted in its replacement with syndicated morning show The Daily Buzz. The WYOU early evening news lineup was revamped again in June 2008 to consist of First at Four, a 4 p.m. early evening newscast; WYOU Interactive at 6 p.m.; and a new WYOU News at 7.

=== End of separate newscasts on WYOU ===
Nexstar and Mission announced on April 3, 2009, that WYOU would cease airing newscasts, with the final newscasts airing that night; they would be replaced by syndicated programs. This resulted in the layoffs of 14 personnel. The station saved nearly $900,000 a year from closing down its news department. Dennis Thatcher, the chief operating officer of Mission Broadcasting, noted that many efforts to attract viewers with new formats, talent, or sets had failed despite the investment. In the last Nielsen ratings prior to the closure, WYOU's weeknight 11 p.m. newscast only garnered a 4% share, and sitcoms on WOLF-TV had better ratings than the 6 p.m. report. Even with the ending of its separate news department, WYOU struggled to receive even a 3% share of the ratings for the syndicated programming that replaced the newscasts.

Local news programs returned to WYOU on April 2, 2012, coinciding with a switch to high-definition news production for WBRE-TV. On that date, dedicated Eyewitness News newscasts at noon and 7 p.m. were added to WYOU's schedule, and the station began to simulcast WBRE's weekday morning and nightly 6 and 11 p.m. newscasts.

In 2018, Nexstar announced it would acquire Tribune Media. Tribune had been the operator of WNEP-TV through a services agreement since 2014. Nexstar elected to retain WBRE, as well as its agreement to operate WYOU, and sold WNEP-TV to Tegna Inc. in 2019. Nexstar agreed to buy Tegna in August 2025 for $6.2 billion; the deal closed on March 19, 2026, after the FCC's Media Bureau waived restrictions prohibiting ownership of more than two full-power licenses in markets such as Scranton–Wilkes-Barre. A temporary restraining order issued one week later by the U.S. District Court for the Eastern District of California, later escalated to a preliminary injunction, has prevented WNEP from being integrated into WBRE and WYOU.

WYOU's archive of newsfilm is the most extensive in the market. WBRE-TV lost all of its footage in 1972 because of Hurricane Agnes, which flooded the station's basement, while WNEP disposed of significant portions of its archive.

== Technical information ==
=== Subchannels ===
WYOU's transmitter is located at the Penobscot Knob antenna farm near Mountain Top. The station's signal is multiplexed:

Subchannels of WYOU
Subchannel	Res.	Short name	Programming
22.1	1080i	WYOU-DT	CBS
22.2	480i	Mystery	Ion Mystery
22.3	480i	GetTV	Great
22.4	480i	Cozi	Cozi TV

WBRE and WYOU began airing digital signals simultaneously in December 2002. Both stations ceased analog broadcasts on the original digital transition date of February 17, 2009, with WYOU continuing to broadcast on VHF channel 13. It was repacked to channel 12 in March 2020 as a result of the 2016 United States wireless spectrum auction.

=== Translator ===
- WYOU (DRT) 25 Waymart

WYOU and the other major Scranton–Wilkes-Barre stations maintain secondary transmitters at Waymart, where the operation of the Waymart Wind Farm interferes with the reception of television signals from Mountain Top. In 2004, the FCC authorized the construction of a tower on Moosic Mountain. FPL Energy (now NextEra Energy Resources), owner of the wind farm, built the facility to provide the signals of the major networks.
