= WBRE-TV =

Television station in Wilkes-Barre, Pennsylvania

- Wilkes-Barre–Scranton, Pennsylvania; United States
- City: Wilkes-Barre, Pennsylvania
- Channels: Digital: 11 (VHF); Virtual: 28
- Branding: WBRE 28; 28/22 News

Programming
- Affiliations: 28.1: NBC; for others, see § Subchannels

Ownership
- Owner: Nexstar Media Group; (Nexstar Media Inc.)
- Sister stations: WYOU; Tegna: WNEP-TV

History
- First air date: January 1, 1953
- Former channel number: Analog: 28 (UHF, 1953–2009)
- Call sign meaning: Baltimore Radio Exchange (former owner of former sister radio station WBRE, now WYCK)

Technical information
- Licensing authority: FCC
- Facility ID: 71225
- ERP: 30 kW
- HAAT: 471 m (1,545 ft)
- Transmitter coordinates: 41°10′58″N 75°52′25″W
- Translator(s): 28 (UHF) Waymart

Links
- Public license information: Public file; LMS
- Website: www.2822news.com

WBRE-TV (channel 28) is a television station licensed to Wilkes-Barre, Pennsylvania, United States, serving Northeastern Pennsylvania as an affiliate of NBC. It is owned by Nexstar Media Group and co-managed with CBS affiliate WYOU (channel 22); Nexstar's Tegna subsidiary owns ABC affiliate WNEP-TV (channel 16). WBRE-TV and WYOU share studios on South Franklin Street in downtown Wilkes-Barre, with a news bureau and sales office next to WYOU's former studios on Lackawanna Avenue in downtown Scranton. WBRE-TV's transmitter is located at the Penobscot Knob antenna farm near Mountain Top.

WBRE-TV operates a digital replacement translator on UHF channel 28 that is licensed to Waymart with a transmitter in Forest City. It exists because wind turbines run by NextEra Energy Resources at the Waymart Wind Farm interfere with the transmission of full-power television signals.

== History ==
WBRE signed on New Year's Day 1953 as Northeast Pennsylvania's first television station. It was owned by the Baltimore family along with WBRE radio (1340 AM, now WYCK, and 98.5 FM, now WKRZ). Although it appears that the call letters stand for Wilkes-Barre, they actually refer to Baltimore Radio Exchange, the Baltimore family's company.

For much of its early history, channel 28 was unable to get a direct feed from NBC because AT&T microwave and wireline operations weren't available in northeast Pennsylvania. Station engineers were thus forced to switch to and from the signals of network flagship WNBT in New York City (now WNBC) and WPTZ in Philadelphia (now KYW-TV) when NBC programming was airing. WPTZ was used as a backup. In efforts to improve the quality and reliability of the received signals, WBRE built its own relay site on Pimple Hill on the west side of Route 115, just south of Pocono Raceway. Reception of the New York stations is very clear and reliable from that site; indeed, it served as a microwave retransmission site for many of the area's cable systems well into the 1990s until fiber optics made microwave transmission obsolete.

In 1972, disaster struck at WBRE when its offices were flooded by Hurricane Agnes. Most of the station's equipment was moved above ground and survived but a film archive in the basement was destroyed. The Baltimore family sold the radio stations in 1980, but held onto channel 28 until selling it to New York–based Northeastern Television Investors in 1984, earning a handsome return on their original investment in WBRE radio in 1925. Current owner Nexstar Broadcasting Group acquired the station in 1997. Nexstar already owned WYOU but opted to keep WBRE and nominally sold WYOU to Mission Broadcasting. However, Nexstar controlled WYOU's operations through a joint sales agreement. On January 3, 2007, Nexstar named Louis J. Abitabilo as vice president and general manager for the two stations.

The station's news operation made a fictional appearance within the NBC comedy series The Office, set in Scranton, in the 6th-season episodes "The Chump" and "Whistleblower", interviewing Michael Scott about reports of malfunctioning printers.

In September 2011, the station was evacuated once again due to potential flooding by heavy rains from Tropical Storm Lee. For 48 hours, the station operated remotely out of the garage of the local Fox affiliate, WOLF-TV. They provided coverage for the entire duration of the evacuation period, nearly 63 hours. Luckily, the station and the majority of the city of Wilkes-Barre were protected by the levee system.

On January 19, 2012, Nexstar named Robert G. Bee as vice president and general manager of WBRE and WYOU. The station went full HD including news and production on April 2, 2012.

In 2018, Nexstar announced it would acquire Tribune Media. Tribune had been the operator of ABC affiliate WNEP-TV through a services agreement since 2014. Nexstar elected to retain WBRE, as well as its agreement to operate WYOU, and sold WNEP-TV to Tegna Inc. in 2019.

Nexstar acquired Tegna in a deal announced in August 2025 and completed on March 19, 2026. A temporary restraining order issued one week later by the U.S. District Court for the Eastern District of California, later escalated to a preliminary injunction, has prevented WNEP from being integrated into WBRE and WYOU.

== News operation ==
WBRE led the ratings for most of the 1950s until WNEP-TV jumped ahead in 1959. During the 1950s and 1960s, mirroring the century-long rivalry between Scranton and Wilkes-Barre, WBRE ruled Wilkes-Barre while WDAU-TV (now WYOU) dominated Scranton. Channel 28 jumped back in the lead in the early-1960s and went back and forth for first place with WDAU until 1978 when WNEP took the lead. It fell to third for most of the 1980s, even with NBC's powerhouse prime time lineup. In the mid-1990s, the station briefly surpassed long-dominant WNEP, then fell again to second after the sale to Nexstar.

In 2002, WBRE and WYOU dropped their separate weekday morning and noon newscasts in favor of Pennsylvania Morning and Pennsylvania Midday which were jointly-produced and simulcast on both stations. Since the two have both trailed WNEP in the news ratings by a wide margin for most of the last thirty years, a major shakeup in format occurred in fall 2006. While WYOU went with a talk/debate format for its weeknight shows, WBRE News became more of a traditional news program. This set a more clear competition against WNEP. At the beginning of 2008, WYOU dropped the weekday shared productions and started airing the first hour of the nationally syndicated morning show The Daily Buzz at 6 a.m. while debuting its own noon news.

On June 9, 2008, there were several more changes made on the two stations. WBRE re-launched its news operation as WBRE Eyewitness News. It had previously used the Eyewitness News moniker from the mid-1980s until 2001. This coincided with news set, music package, graphics, and weather system upgrades. There were also some on-air personnel changes. Anchor Andy Mehalshick became a weeknight field anchor. Candice Kelly, who had been anchoring on WYOU, moved to the weeknight newscasts on WBRE back in mid-May and was joined by newcomer Drew Speier. In addition, WBRE and WYOU's midday shows switched anchors. Mark Hiller moved from WBRE to WYOU while Eva Mastromatteo switched over to this station. Hiller also debuted as anchor of WYOU News First at 4 on weeknights. That station became the first in the area to broadcast local news at that time. This was followed at 4:30 p.m. by The Insider which moved from its 7 p.m. slot. WYOU then dropped its 5 p.m. newscast and aired two episodes of Judge Judy. Finally weeknights at 6 p.m., Lyndall Stout (who anchored on WBRE) joined Eric Scheiner for the half-hour WYOU Inter@ctive. That station also launched a new weeknight newscast, WYOU News at 7. WNEP already aired local news at that time on weeknights. All of the preceding changes were an attempt to better compete against WNEP and get more ratings.

On April 4, 2009, WYOU shut down its news operation resulting in the layoff of fourteen personnel while others were integrated with WBRE. Syndicated programming began airing in place of the newscasts. The station saved nearly $1 million a year as a result of closing down its news department.

Fox affiliate WOLF-TV (channel 56) dropped WNEP as their news supplier at the end of 2009. WOLF then went to WBRE to take over starting January 1, 2010. WBRE then took over production of nightly prime time broadcasts on WOLF-TV which expanded to an hour and were re-branded as Fox 56 News First at 10.

WBRE launched a new 4 p.m. show called PA Live! in the fall of 2011. It focused on lifestyle news covering the greater Wilkes-Barre and Scranton area. Along with its main studios, WBRE operates four news bureaus: Scranton (on Lackawanna Avenue), Stroudsburg (Main Street), Williamsport (on Pine Street), and Hazleton (East 10th Street).

On April 2, 2012, WBRE began broadcasting its local newscasts in high definition, with a new news set, HD cameras and forecasting equipment. With the upgrade, the station began producing half-hour newscasts at noon and 7 p.m. on sister station WYOU, the first such newscasts on that station since WYOU's in-house news department folded in 2009; those newscasts were also broadcast in high definition; in addition, simulcasts of WBRE's weekday morning, and nightly 6 and 11 p.m. newscasts began to be carried on WYOU. This was a similar operation to existing joint news operations formed by Nexstar/Mission stations the year prior, between WUTR and WFXV in Utica, New York, and WTVW and WEHT in Evansville, Indiana.

=== Former on-air staff ===
- Keith Martin – news anchor (1977–1980, 1990–2003)

== Technical information ==
=== Subchannels ===
The station's signal is multiplexed:

Subchannels of WBRE-TV
Subchannel	Res.	Short name	Programming
28.1	1080i	WBRE-DT	NBC
28.2	480i	Laff	Laff
28.3	480i	Rewind	Rewind TV
28.4	480i	Defy	Defy

On June 15, 2016, Nexstar announced that it has entered into an affiliation agreement with Katz Broadcasting for the Escape, Laff, Grit, and Bounce TV networks (the last one of which is owned by Bounce Media LLC, whose COO Jonathan Katz is president/CEO of Katz Broadcasting), bringing the four networks to 81 stations owned and/or operated by Nexstar, including WBRE-TV and WYOU.

=== Analog-to-digital conversion ===
WBRE-TV shut down its analog signal, over UHF channel 28, on February 17, 2009, the original target date on which full-power television stations in the United States were to transition from analog to digital broadcasts under federal mandate (which was later pushed back to June 12, 2009). The station's digital signal remained on its pre-transition VHF channel 11, using virtual channel 28.

=== Translator ===
- WBRE-TV (DRT) 28 Waymart

Like other stations in the area, WBRE was forced to rely on repeaters to serve its coverage area for most of its history. The market is one of the largest (in land area) east of the Mississippi River and is very mountainous. In addition, Scranton–Wilkes-Barre was a "UHF island" before the digital transition because it is too close to Philadelphia and New York City for VHF analog service. During March 2010, in a cost-cutting move, all owned and operated translators were shut down after Nexstar determined that its VHF signal for WBRE is adequate enough to reach most of the market. VHF signals "bend" over rugged terrain more easily than UHF signals. According to nepahdtv.com, this move was met with some dismay from viewers in areas where reception of signals from Penobscot Knob is difficult if not impossible, leaving many people in rural areas unable to watch the station. Many of these areas are among the few in the country where cable and satellite are not readily available. Despite this, no effort from Nexstar has been made to bring back any of the repeaters.

== Out-of-market cable coverage ==
In New York State, WBRE is carried on Charter Spectrum in Monticello in Sullivan County, which is part of the New York City market.

=== As fill-in for other NBC affiliates during disputes ===
- During a retransmission dispute involving Smith Media station WKTV, WBRE-TV was seen on Time Warner Cable in the Utica area from December 16, 2010, until January 8, 2011.
- At 11:59 a.m. on June 10, 2012, Time Warner Cable began broadcasting WBRE's programming in the Upstate NY region during a re-transmission dispute involving WPTZ, a station in Plattsburgh, New York, owned by Hearst Television.
- On July 9, 2012, the dispute between Time Warner Cable and Hearst extended to other TWC systems; on TWC systems in the Piedmont Triad and Bright House Networks systems in Central Florida, WXII-TV and WESH, respectively, was replaced with WBRE; TWC and Bright House opted for such a distant signal like WBRE, as they do not have the rights to carry any NBC affiliate closest to them. However, Nexstar complained that Time Warner Cable has used their signals outside their markets without permission, while Time Warner Cable was within its rights to use their signals as replacements until a deal with Hearst is reached. The substitution of WBRE in place of WPTZ, WESH and WXII lasted until July 19, 2012, when the deal was reached between Hearst and TWC.
