= Haystack Mountain (Pennsylvania) =

Mountain

Coordinates: 41°10′45.9″N 75°53′31.22″W

Highest point
- Elevation: 1,871 ft (570 m)
- Prominence: 1,871 ft (570 m)

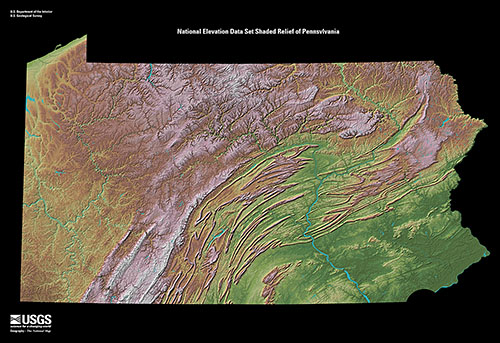
Relief detail of Pennsylvania

Haystack Mountain (Pennsylvania), is an otherwise non-descript 1871 ft peak forming the steep southwestern faces of the Solomon Gap mountain pass's saddle connecting and dividing the Wyoming Valley from the Lehigh Valley.

On the opposite side of the saddle, which forms an important multi-modal transport corridor is the much higher Penobscot Mountain. The peak is part of a ridge descending southwesterly toward Hazelton and within sight of the western fringe of the Poconos while being located today within the incorporated boundaries of Mountain Top, Pennsylvania. Through the Solomon Gap pass northeast and below it lies an important multi-modal transportation corridor channeling a busy railroad right of way and through which PA Route 309 and PA Route 437 funnel paralleling the pioneering railway which built the area. At one time before incorporation, Mountain Top and the saddle of the pass was known by the Amerindian name Penobscot, which name has also been given the opposite higher peak, Penobscot Mountain. Together, the peaks and pass forms part of the drainage divide between the Lehigh Valley & greater Delaware River drainage basin and the Wyoming and Susquehanna Valley, part of the Potomac River drainage basin. Because of the strong barriers of the local East-West oriented ridge lines of the local Ridge and Valley Appalachians chain, the Solomon Gap pass formed between the two peaks was one of the few places a railroad could be envisioned in the 1830s when the fuel crises in eastern cities demanded easier transportation to the Northern Anthracite Coal Fields. Ironically, the company forming the railroad which cut over 100 miles off the trip from Philadelphia to Wilkes-Barre was the same entity with a near monopoly in providing coal from the Southern Anthracite region, Lehigh Coal & Navigation Company (LC&N, f.1821), which had built both the Lehigh Canal, but also the nation's second railway, the Summit Hill & Mauch Chunk Railroad. The LC&N company seemed to relish taking on tasks which left others running, and developed the technology to make the task happen.

The whole uplands north and west faces overlook the Wyoming Valley from the southeastern corner near Hazleton towards and through the greater south Wilkes-Barre area. The southern and eastern slopes just give peeks into portions of the Poconos and wider views of the Lehigh Valley descending down to White Haven, for the Poconos technically are left-bank bounded by the Lehigh.

The prominence of Haystack Mountain is about 1,871 feet (570 meters) above sea level, and wholly within the incorporated limits of Mountain Top where it is today, mostly surrounded by residences. In the 1870s unhappy with the navigation choke hold into the Wyoming Valley various eastern business interests had little trouble raising capital to form a competing rail company, the Lehigh Valley Railroad to challenge the LC&N operating subsidiary, Lehigh and Susquehanna Railroad (LVRR). Utilizing the advantage of new higher power locomotives, the new-fangled dynamite technology, and some clever surveying of alternative routes, the LVRR quickly built a parallel road from New Jersey, across the Delaware, and up along the Lehigh & Susquehanna's trackage all the way to the connecting junctions managed by shortline rail companies in the Avoca/Moosic area. But the LVRR also split its tracks in Mountaintop, crossed over and above the LH&S tracks onto Haystack Mountain, which branch line traversed down to Hazelton and South Wilkes-Barre, then looped back through the heart of the municipalities of Wilkes-Barre to loop back on itself. A northwestern spur connected to Buffalo, New York and ran an express service, the famous Black Diamond Express from New York City to Buffalo, through Wilkes-Barre down the slopes descending into the valley cut into Haystack Mountain's flanks.
