= Keith Martin (journalist) =

American television broadcaster (died 2022)

- Born: George Keith Martin Jr. 1946 or 1947; Scranton, Pennsylvania
- Died: February 13, 2022; Pawleys Island, South Carolina
- Education: Lafayette College (BA)
- Occupations: Television journalist, news anchor
- Years active: 1970s-2005
- Spouse: Kay Grant Martin

George Keith Martin Jr. (died February 13, 2022) was an American television news anchor who worked at WBRE and WGAL for over thirty years. He was also known as a commissioned officer and decorated veteran of the Vietnam War in the U.S. Army, United States Army Reserve, and the Pennsylvania National Guard for 34 years, and was Pennsylvania's first director of homeland security.

== Career ==
In 1968, Martin was commissioned as a second lieutenant in the U.S. Army and served 2 1/2 years while on active duty, which included being deployed to Vietnam and Cambodia from 1969 through 1970. He continued working in the Army Reserve and PA National Guard until he retired as a colonel and received a promotion to brigadier general.

Martin began his journalism career in 1977 as lead news anchor for WBRE in Wilkes-Barre, Pennsylvania.

He then left WBRE in 1980 and joined WGAL in Lancaster, Pennsylvania, where he was an anchor and reporter. He co-anchored the evening newscast, and mentored young WGAL journalists. Martin resigned from WGAL in 1990 after allegations of involvement in a campaign contributions scandal, for which he denied any illegal activity.

He returned to WBRE in 1990, where he once again became the main news anchor until 2003, when then-Governor Ed Rendell appointed him to serve as Pennsylvania's first director of homeland security based on his experience overseas. He then stepped down in 2005.

== Death ==
Martin died of a heart attack at age 75 on February 13, 2022, at his home in Pawleys Island, South Carolina.
