= WVIA-TV =

Television station in Scranton, Pennsylvania

- Scranton–Wilkes-Barre, Pennsylvania; United States
- City: Scranton, Pennsylvania
- Channels: Digital: 21 (UHF), shared with WNEP-TV; Virtual: 44
- Branding: WVIA

Programming
- Affiliations: 44.1: PBS; 44.2: PBS Kids; 44.3: Create

Ownership
- Owner: Northeast Pennsylvania Educational Television Association
- Sister stations: WVIA-FM

History
- First air date: September 26, 1966
- Former channel numbers: Analog: 44 (UHF, 1966–2009); Digital: 41 (UHF, 2001–2017), 50 (UHF, 2017–2020)
- Former affiliations: NET (1966–1970)
- Call sign meaning: The World Via Television

Technical information
- Licensing authority: FCC
- Facility ID: 47929
- ERP: 760 kW
- HAAT: 509.2 m (1,671 ft)
- Transmitter coordinates: 41°10′55″N 75°52′16″W
- Translator(s): see § Translators

Links
- Public license information: Public file; LMS
- Website: www.wvia.org

WVIA-TV (channel 44) is a PBS member television station licensed to Scranton, Pennsylvania, United States, serving Northeastern Pennsylvania. Owned by the Northeast Pennsylvania Educational Television Association, it is sister to NPR member WVIA-FM (89.9). WVIA-TV and WVIA-FM share studios on WVIA Way in Jenkins Township (which shares a post office with Pittston) and a secondary studio inside the Community Arts Center on West 4th Street in downtown Williamsport. Through a channel sharing agreement with ABC affiliate WNEP-TV (channel 16), the two stations transmit using WNEP-TV's spectrum from an antenna at Penobscot Knob near Mountain Top.

== History ==
=== 20th century ===
In 1963, several men first met at Coughlin High School in Wilkes-Barre to discuss bringing an educational television station to Northeastern Pennsylvania. Twelve of the men formed the Northeast Pennsylvania Educational Television Association, chaired by Wilkes-Barre superintendent of schools Walter Wood. They received a license for channel 44 a year later.

The station's first employee, general manager George Strimel, Jr., was hired in 1965 and given two years to get the station on the air. He was able to do so within nine months, and WVIA-TV signed on for the first time on September 26, 1966. The fledgling station received a considerable assist from the area's commercial stations. WNEP-TV donated the old transmitter and tower facility from WARM-TV, one of the two stations that merged to form WNEP ten years earlier, while WBRE-TV (channel 28) and WDAU-TV (channel 22, now WYOU) made their studios available for local productions. All production work was done from the transmitter site.

The station grew rapidly, and within a year moved its offices from First Presbyterian Church in Wilkes-Barre to office space donated by King's College, and later to a school in Scranton. In 1969, WVIA moved to a specially-built studio at Marywood College in Scranton. In 1971, WVIA moved to its current studio in Jenkins Township.

The station didn't take long to become a part of the community; it won the Corporation for Public Broadcasting's award for community involvement for two straight years in the 1970s. It was the only public television station in Pennsylvania to stay on the air during a 1970 budget crisis. When Hurricane Agnes struck the area in 1972, WVIA preempted its programming to air weather reports around the clock, and lent its equipment to WBRE so it could stay on the air.

In 1978, WVIA activated its current tower on Penobscot Knob. It increased the station's coverage by 20%, enabling it to reach 20 counties and giving it a coverage area comparable with most of the area's commercial stations. The station also operates the largest translator network in Pennsylvania.

For many years, WVIA was available on cable systems beyond the Scranton–Wilkes-Barre TV market, including Optimum in Fairfield County, Connecticut and Nassau County, New York. It carried Saturday and Sunday morning sitcom reruns, and Leave it to Beaver, The Dick Van Dyke Show, and The Honeymooners on weekday afternoons, and on Saturday nights ran science-fiction series, including Star Trek, which ran on WVIA from 1984 to 1994, The Twilight Zone, The Outer Limits, Doctor Who, and Lost in Space on Saturday mornings. Later in the day, the station aired The Waltons at 4:30 and 5 p.m. and All in the Family at 6 p.m. from 1989 to 1991. From 1991 until 2009, WVIA aired Little House on the Prairie from 5 p.m. to 6 p.m. All shows were broadcast according to PBS standards, airing commercial-free with underwriting announcements added before and after each show.

=== 21st century ===
On December 16, 2007, the top section of WVIA's tower collapsed due to severe ice, wind, and snow. The felled top section of the tower supported the antennas for the analog TV signal on channel 44 and the digital TV signal on channel 41. WVIA-FM's antenna survived since it was located on the portion of the tower which did not collapse. After the incident, WVIA quickly put the analog TV signal back on the air through the use of a shorter back-up tower and antenna also located on Penobscot Knob. However, due to the shorter height, the service area has been limited.

Earlier that same day, the neighboring tower supporting the antennas for analog WNEP-TV and WCLH (90.7 FM) collapsed completely due to the ice and winds. The tower collapse also destroyed the transmitter building but no one was hurt in either incidents.

In 2009, following the end of the Pennsylvania Public Television Network, the Commonwealth of Pennsylvania cut WVIA's funding by $970,000, which forced the station to end production of several local programs.

On February 17, 2009, WVIA-TV shut down its analog signal, over UHF channel 44, meeting the original target date on which full-power television stations in the United States were to transition from analog to digital broadcasts under federal mandate, which was later pushed back to June 12, 2009. The station's digital signal remained on its pre-transition UHF channel 41. Through the use of PSIP, digital television receivers display the station's virtual channel as its former UHF analog channel 44.

WVIA suffered another disruption to its signal on February 12, 2010, when the building housing the transmitters for WVIA-TV and WVIA-FM was destroyed by fire. Though the tower was not impacted, the loss of the transmitters forced the stations off the air. The station quickly worked to restore programming to cable systems. The station returned to the air as of February 15, 2010 with assistance from WNEP-TV, using the ABC affiliate's transitional digital channel 49 transmitter and tower. The station moved to digital channel 50 post-transition in December 2009 to reduce interference with Philadelphia/Atlantic City Telemundo affiliate WWSI, but did not disassemble the former channel 49 facilities to transmit all of their services. Like WVIA's digital channel 41, all channels remapped via PSIP to Channel 44.

In August 2011, thieves stole 400 feet (122 m) of copper transmission line from WVIA's tower while WVIA was still temporarily using WNEP-TV's old tower, delaying a return to channel 41 and their own tower. WVIA resumed use of their channel 41 transmitter and tower in March 2012.

The station sold its spectrum in FCC's broadcast auction ending February 10, 2017 for $25.9 million. The proceeds were placed in its endowment. In conjunction with the auction result, the station announced a channel sharing agreement with WNEP, which permits it to stay on its virtual channel 44.

== Programming ==
WVIA-TV produces shows such as Call the Doctor and Homegrown Concerts, and shows that focus on Pennsylvania and Northeast Pennsylvania.

WVIA has historically aired children's programs during the day, and for many years, when it was an hour-long program, aired Sesame Street three times on weekdays, including the previous weekday's episode in the morning, and the current day's episode at noon and at various times in late afternoon.

With the advent of the PBS Kids subchannel, WVIA has scaled back its children's programming on weekdays from 6 a.m. to 1 p.m. on its main channel.

== Technical information ==
=== Subchannels ===
Subchannels of WNEP-TV and WVIA-TV
License	Subchannel	Res.	Short name	Programming
WNEP-TV	16.1	720p	WNEP-TV	ABC
WNEP-TV	16.2	480i	WNEP2	Antenna TV
WVIA-TV	44.1	720p	WVIA-HD	PBS
WVIA-TV	44.2	480i	PBSKids	PBS Kids
WVIA-TV	44.3	480i	Create	Create

=== Translators ===
WVIA serves one of the largest coverage areas east of the Mississippi River. This area is very mountainous meaning that some areas cannot get a clear signal from the main transmitter.

City of license	Callsign	Channel	ERP	HAAT	Facility ID	Transmitter coordinates
Waymart	WVIA-TV (DRT)	18	0.323 kW	241 m (791 ft)	47929	41°37′55.3″N 75°25′31.6″W
Williamsport	WVIA-TV (DRT)	17	0.121 kW	382.2 m (1,254 ft)	47929	41°12′31.2″N 76°57′30.1″W
