= Radio Goethe =

American syndicated radio program

- Genre: Eclectic
- Country of origin: United States
- Language: English
- Hosted by: Arndt Peltner
- Recording studio: Oakland, California
- Original release: November 1996
- Website: radiogoethe.org

Radio Goethe is an American weekly syndicated radio program produced in Oakland, California.

== Content ==
Arndt Peltner hosts Radio Goethe, a weekly radio program that was started in November 1996 on the College Radio Station KUSF, San Francisco. The show features music from Germany, Austria and Switzerland, is non-formatted and non-commercial. The music spans from Rock to Industrial, Electronic and much more. Since 1999 the show has been syndicated on stations in Canada, the US and several countries in Europe.

Radio Goethe has been known to do special features such as a show devoted to the 2006 FIFA World Cup where different host cities were presented, and more recently six music shows for the "Wunderbar Together" events, the "Deutschlandjahr" in the USA.

In 2004 Arndt Peltner was awarded for his cultural work with Radio Goethe with the "Bundesverdienstkreuz", the Merit of Order of the Federal Republic of Germany.

Peltner lives in Oakland and is a native of Germany.

== Availability ==
Pre-made hour-long selections are played over the following stations:

- CFUV: Victoria, British Columbia, Canada
- CFXU: Antigonish, Nova Scotia, Canada
- CHMA: Sackville, New Brunswick, Canada
- CHMR: St. John's, Newfoundland and Labrador, Canada
- CHSR: Fredericton, New Brunswick, Canada
- CJSF: Burnaby, British Columbia, Canada
- CKLU: Sudbury, Ontario, Canada
- Hitradio Namibia: Windhoek, Namibia
- KAMP: Tucson, Arizona, United States
- KAOS: Olympia, Washington, United States
- KBVR: Corvallis, Oregon, United States
- KCFV: St. Louis, Missouri, United States
- KMSC: Moorhead, Minnesota, United States
- KMSM: Butte, Montana, United States
- KPSU: Portland, Oregon, United States
- KRYZ: Mariposa, California, United States
- KSPC: Claremont, California, United States
- KUMM: Morris, Minnesota, United States
- KUSF: San Francisco, California, United States
- KWMR: Point Reyes Station, California
- PRX: Public Radio Exchange
- WBDG: Indianapolis, Indiana, United States
- WCLH: Wilkes-Barre, Pennsylvania, United States
- WCRD: Muncie, Indiana, United States
- WRHO: Oneonta, New York, United States
- WRRG: River Grove, Illinois, United States
- WSUM: Madison, Wisconsin, United States
- WSYC: Shippensburg, Pennsylvania, United States
- WUTS: Sewanee, Tennessee, United States

== See also ==
- Culture of San Francisco
- List of U.S. radio programs
- Radio in the United States
