= WBPZ-TV =

Television station in Lock Haven, Pennsylvania (1958–1959)

Lock Haven, Pennsylvania; United States
- Channels: Analog: 32 (UHF)

Programming
- Affiliations: ABC; NBC (secondary)

Ownership
- Owner: Lock Haven Broadcasting Corporation
- Sister stations: WBPZ

History
- First air date: March 1958
- Last air date: September 4, 1959

Technical information
- ERP: 18.2 kW
- HAAT: 300 ft (91 m)

WBPZ-TV (channel 32) was a television station in Lock Haven, Pennsylvania, United States. The station was owned by the Lock Haven Broadcasting Corporation.

== History ==
WBPZ-TV began broadcasting in March 1958, from its transmitter atop Sugar Lusk Mountain. Channel 32's establishment made Lock Haven the smallest city in the United States with its own television outlet—and WBPZ-TV the smallest station in the United States. The station would operate as an ABC affiliate, with some NBC programs, by rebroadcasting the output of Wilkes-Barre television station WILK-TV (channel 34). The radio station added five employees in anticipation of the new television operation. Soon after launching, WBPZ-TV appeared on cable systems from State College to Williamsport.

WBPZ-TV ceased operating on September 4, 1959, citing financial pressures; the radio station continued operating. The next year, the Lock Haven Broadcasting Corporation reached an agreement to sell channel 32 to Scranton Broadcasters, owners of WDAU-TV (channel 22) in Scranton; under the proposal, which never became reality, Scranton Broadcasters would have leased the equipment for three years with an option to buy, and channel 32 would have repeated channel 22 for Williamsport, Lock Haven and State College. An agreement was reached to donate equipment used by the television station to Lock Haven State College in 1962; the college lacked interest in operating a broadcast facility, and a second offer was made to the local school board in 1965. The Federal Communications Commission (FCC) canceled WBPZ-TV's license in 1965 as part of a purge of unbuilt or non-operational UHF television stations.
