= WVIA-FM =

Public radio station in Scranton, Pennsylvania

- Scranton, Pennsylvania; United States
- Broadcast area: Northeastern Pennsylvania
- Frequency: 89.9 MHz (HD Radio)

Programming
- Format: Public radio, talk, classical and jazz
- Subchannels: HD2: Arts Radio (classical music; Classical 24); HD3: The Chiaroscuro Channel (jazz)
- Affiliations: NPR; BBC World Service

Ownership
- Owner: Northeastern Pennsylvania Educational Television Association
- Sister stations: WVIA-TV

History
- First air date: April 23, 1973
- Call sign meaning: The World Via Radio

Technical information
- Licensing authority: FCC
- Facility ID: 49436
- Class: B
- ERP: 7,400 watts (analog); 295 watts (digital)
- HAAT: 381 meters (1,250 ft)
- Transmitter coordinates: 41°10′55.3″N 75°52′15.7″W
- Translator: See § Simulcasts and translators
- Repeater: See § Simulcasts and translators

Links
- Public license information: Public file; LMS
- Webcast: Listen live
- Website: wvia.org

WVIA-FM (89.9 FM) is a non-commercial radio station licensed to Scranton, Pennsylvania, United States. It is the NPR member station for Northeastern Pennsylvania. The station is owned by the Northeastern Pennsylvania Educational Television Association along with its sister television station, WVIA-TV, with studios in Jenkins Township, near Pittston and a secondary studio inside the Community Arts Center on West 4th Street in downtown Williamsport. It airs a mix of NPR news and talk shows, classical music in middays, jazz at night and the BBC World Service overnight.

WVIA-FM's transmitter tower is on Penobscot Knob near Mountain Top. WVIA-FM broadcasts using HD Radio technology. Its HD2 digital subchannel is "Arts Radio", airing classical music. The station owns Chiaroscuro Records and broadcasts "The Chiaroscuro Channel" on its HD3 subchannel with a jazz format.

== History ==
WVIA-FM signed on the air on April 23, 1973. It joined its television counterpart, WVIA-TV, which went on the air in 1966.

The building housing the transmitters for WVIA-FM and WVIA-TV was destroyed by fire on February 12, 2010. WVIA-FM resumed broadcasting at low power on February 17, 2010, and returned to full-power at Noon on August 3, 2010.

WVIA-FM has operated a translator at 89.3 FM in Williamsport since the late 1970s. In 2002, WVIA-FM's owners signed on WVYA, a full-power Class A station, to provide better coverage in that area. In 2010, a third full-power station, WTIO in Mainesburg, was brought online, taking over from a translator that had served the Tioga Valley. A fourth station joined the group in 2012, when WPAU signed on from Palmyra Township to serve the far northeastern corner of the state.

== Simulcasts and translators ==
Four full-power stations are licensed to simulcast the programming of WVIA-FM full-time:

Call sign	Frequency	City of license	Facility ID	Class	ERP (W)	Height (m (ft))	Transmitter coordinates	Service contour
WVBU-FM	90.5 FM	Lewisburg, Pennsylvania	7722	A	225	−10 m (−33 ft)	40°57′18.0″N 76°52′55.0″W	Covers Lewisburg, Pennsylvania
WTIO	88.3 FM	Mainesburg, Pennsylvania	177089	A	48	258.6 m (848 ft)	41°45′34.2″N 76°55′29.8″W	Covers Mansfield, Pennsylvania
WPAU	91.5 FM	Palmyra Township, Pennsylvania	173824	A	400	167 m (548 ft)	41°24′43.3″N 75°09′49.6″W	Covers Hawley and the Lake Wallenpaupack area
WVYA	89.7 FM (HD)	Williamsport, Pennsylvania	92638	A	3,300 (analog); 132 (digital)	−5 m (−16 ft)	41°14′54.2″N 77°01′50.8″W	—

WVIA-FM programming is broadcast on the following translators:

Call sign	Frequency (MHz)	City of license	Facility ID	Rebroadcasts
W257AI	99.3	Allentown, Pennsylvania	49456	WVIA-FM
W289AH	105.7	Bethlehem, Pennsylvania	77210	WVIA-FM
W212AT	90.3	Clarks Summit, Pennsylvania	49461	WVIA-FM
W261CA	100.1	Lewisburg, Pennsylvania	49424	WVIA-FM
W235AD	94.9	Pottsville, Pennsylvania	84035	WVIA-FM
W232AM	94.3	Stroudsburg, Pennsylvania	49448	WVIA-FM
W289AI	105.7	Sunbury, Pennsylvania	49460	WVIA-FM
W278AO	103.5	Wellsboro, Pennsylvania	141552	WTIO
W207AA	89.3	Williamsport, Pennsylvania	49418	WVIA-FM
