= Mainesburg, Pennsylvania =

Unincorporated community in Pennsylvania, US

- Unincorporated community
- Location within Pennsylvania
- Coordinates: 41°47′02″N 76°59′54″W
- Country: United States
- State: Pennsylvania
- County: Tioga
- Elevation: 1,398 ft (426 m)
- Time zone: UTC-5 (Eastern (EST))
  - Summer (DST): UTC-4 (EDT)
- ZIP code: 16932
- Area codes: 272 & 570
- GNIS feature ID: 1180234

Mainesburg is an unincorporated community in Tioga County, Pennsylvania, United States. The community is located along U.S. Route 6, 4.4 miles (7.1 km) east-southeast of Mansfield. Mainesburg has a post office with ZIP code 16932, which opened on January 27, 1830.

== Demographics ==
Historical population
Census	Pop.	Note	%±

The United States Census Bureau defined Mainesburg as a census designated place (CDP) in 2023.
