= WYLN-CD =

Television station in Hazleton, Pennsylvania

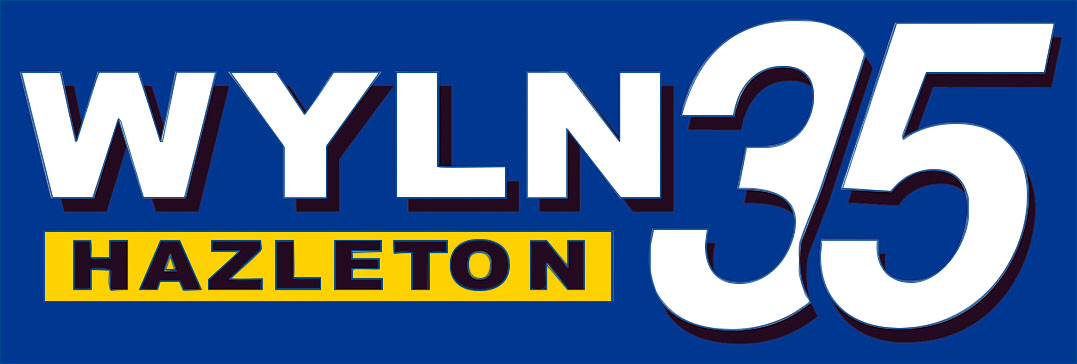
- Hazleton, Pennsylvania; United States
- Channels: Digital: 26 (UHF), to move to 27 (UHF); Virtual: 35

Programming
- Affiliations: 35.1: YTA TV

Ownership
- Owner: Triple J Community Broadcasting, L.L.C. (sale to Sonshine Family Television pending)

History
- Founded: September 21, 1989
- First air date: May 24, 1991
- Former call signs: W35AT (1989–1996); WYLN-LP (1996–2019)
- Former channel numbers: Analog: 35 (UHF, 1991–2015); Digital: 35 (UHF, 2015–2019)
- Former affiliations: Independent (1991–1995); The WB (1995–1998); America One (1998–2015)
- Call sign meaning: We're Your Local Network

Technical information
- Licensing authority: FCC
- Facility ID: 68135
- Class: CD
- ERP: 5.5 kW; 15 kW (CP)
- HAAT: 160.6 m (527 ft)
- Transmitter coordinates: 40°58′10″N 75°57′23″W

Links
- Public license information: Public file; LMS
- Website: www.wylntv35.com

WYLN-CD (channel 35) is a low-power, Class A television station in Hazleton, Pennsylvania, United States, affiliated with YTA TV. The station is owned by Triple J Community Broadcasting, L.L.C. WYLN-CD's transmitter is located near Hazleton.

== History ==
The station went on the air on May 24, 1991, as W35AT, and changed to the current WYLN-LP in 1996. A year prior, it became the first affiliate of The WB in the Scranton–Wilkes-Barre–Hazleton market that year, later losing the affiliation to WSWB-TV in 1998. Until 2015, the station was an America One affiliate. That same year, America One merged with Youtoo TV, with the merged network being called Youtoo America (now YTA TV).

== Programming ==
Since 1989, WYLN has produced a live, local news program, airing live at 5:30 p.m. with rebroadcasts at 6:30 p.m., 10 p.m., 11:30 p.m. and 8 a.m. the following day on weekdays. News coverage is based in Hazleton and surrounding areas. WYLN's newscasts center around local news and segments, such as "Community and You", "Trooper Talk Tuesday", and "Wellness Wednesday".

WYLN also airs local sporting events such as high school football, basketball, wrestling, swimming and baseball, college athletics, and Lehigh Valley IronPigs baseball.

WYLN produces several local programs, such as Talkin' NEPA, an in-depth interview show; Warrior Summit Outdoors, starring Retired SSG Erik Olson and combat veterans from multiple conflicts, focus on healing the often invisible wounds of war through outdoor activities; and Off the Beaten Path, hosted by Jeff Bonomo, featuring the "interesting & unique people, places and things in Pennsylvania."

== Subchannel ==
Subchannels of WYLN-CD
Channel	Res.	Short name	Programming
35.1	480i	WYLN	YTA TV (4:3)

== Translators ==
- W36EY-D Berwick
- W09DB-D Williamsport
