= Penobscot Knob =

Mountain in Pennsylvania, United States

- Penobscot Mountain
- Location within Pennsylvania

Highest point
- Elevation: 2,103 ft (641 m)

Geography
- Location: Luzerne County, Pennsylvania
- Parent range: Appalachian Mountains
- Topo map: USGS 40075G8, 1947&'83 Tamaqua (PA) Quadrangle

Penobscot Knob, also Penobscot Mountain, is a summit that is located in the western fringe of the Poconos nearest to Mountain Top, Pennsylvania. The Solomon Gap pass below it contains an important multi-modal transportation corridor.

== History and notable features ==
At one time before incorporation, Mountain Top and the saddle of the pass was known by the Amerindian name Penobscot. Penobscot Mountain forms part of the drainage divide between the Lehigh Valley & greater Delaware River drainage basin and the Wyoming and Susquehanna Valley, part of the Potomac River drainage basin. The pass formed between Penobscot and Haystack Mountain a few thousand feet to the West was one of the few places a railroad could be envisioned in the 1830s when the fuel crises in eastern cities demanded easier transportation to the Northern Anthracite Coal Fields, which ironically, came to be exploited by the company with a near monopoly in providing coal from the Southern Anthracite region, Lehigh Coal & Navigation Company (LC&N, f.1821), which had built both the Lehigh Canal and the nation's second railway, the Summit Hill & Mauch Chunk Railroad.

The whole uplands north and west faces overlook the Wyoming Valley from the southeastern corner near Hazleton towards and through the greater south Wilkes-Barre area. The southern and eastern slopes just give peeks into portions of the Poconos and wider views of the Lehigh Valley descending down to White Haven, for the Poconos technically are left-bank bounded by the Lehigh.

The shoulders of the peak, an elevated flat area saddle pass peak today is perhaps best known as the site of many local television and radio station transmitter antennas. The first broadcast station located there was WIZZ FM followed by WILK FM. Much of the engineering and work on the WIZZ site was conducted by Major Edwin Armstrong, the inventor of several technologies including FM.

WIZZ is now WMGS which still broadcasts from the same building erected in 1947 for WIZZ. WILK FM became WILK TV then WNEP TV. WVIA-TV, WVIA-FM, WNEP, WYOU, WBRE, and WOLF-TV are some of the major stations that broadcast from the high elevation there, but the peak was known for another reason in the nineteenth century, the saddle or pass on its western slope together with its other terrain features were the best place to build a railroad across the south and east faces of the bowl of the Wyoming Valley from the 'direct road' down the level water route to the Delaware Canal and Delaware River above and alongside the Lehigh Canal, cutting off nearly 100 miles from a rail trip to Philadelphia.

Penobscot Knob is about 2,100 feet (640 meters) above sea level.

== Analog broadcast tower collapse ==
WNEP-TV's transmission tower broadcasting the analog signal on channel 16 collapsed on December 16, 2007, due to severe ice, winds, and snow at the transmitter location on Penobscot Knob. The tower collapse also destroyed the transmitter building. No one was injured during the incident. Transmission of the digital signal on channel 49 was restored after a brief interruption of power to the tower supporting the digital transmitter and antenna. WNEP's signal on local cable systems and satellite was restored before the end of the day. The ice and winds on December 16, 2007, also brought down or damaged the towers broadcasting WYOU-TV, WBRE-TV (digital), WVIA-TV (analog and digital), and WCLH which are located within proximity on Penobscot Knob. The 800-foot (240 m) WNEP tower completely collapsed.

The top 150 feet (46 meters) of the WVIA tower fell, as well as its digital antenna. The WNEP tower fell across power lines knocking out the power to the other transmitters, except the WBRE analog transmitter, which was on a different line.
