= Bald Mountain (Pennsylvania) =

Mountain in Lackawanna County, Pennsylvania, U.S.

Coordinates: 41.42907°N 75.75030°W

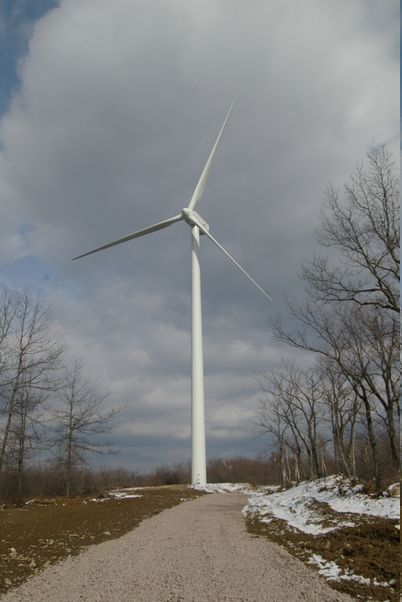
- Wind turbine at Bald Mountain

Highest point
- Elevation: 2,280 ft (690 m)

Geography
- Location: Northeastern Pennsylvania, U.S.
- Parent range: Appalachian Mountains
- Topo map: USGS Ransom(PA) Quadrangle

Climbing
- Easiest route: Pinnacle Rock Trail

Bald Mountain is a prominent peak in Northeastern Pennsylvania which stands above the Wilkes-Barre and Scranton area (also known as the Wyoming Valley). On the summit is an outcrop of Catskill conglomerate (Devonian age) known as the "Pinnacle Rock". From the summit one can view the northernmost extension of the geologic province known as the Glaciated Low Plateaus section. The mountain itself is in the Ridge and Valley Appalachians.

To access the summit one can take the Pinnacle Rock trail. The trailhead is on the west side of the mountain and is a nine hundred foot vertical gain.
