= Waymart Wind Farm =

Wind farm in Pennsylvania, United States

Coordinates: 41.5635°N 75.4448°W

Waymart Wind Farm is the second largest wind farm in Pennsylvania, United States. It consists of 43 GE 1.5 MW wind turbines, with a total net capacity of 64.5 MW, "which is enough renewable energy to power more than 21,000 Pennsylvania homes." The project is located in Wayne County, Pennsylvania. The wind farm was developed by Atlantic Renewable Energy and constructed by NextEra Energy Resources. Energy from the wind farm is sold to Exelon for distribution in the Mid-Atlantic region.

On March 9, 2026, a fire broke out in turbine number two which destroyed it; the turbine was near Browndale and Forest City.

== See also ==
- Wind power in Pennsylvania
