= Waymart, Pennsylvania =

Borough in Pennsylvania, US

Waymart
- Borough
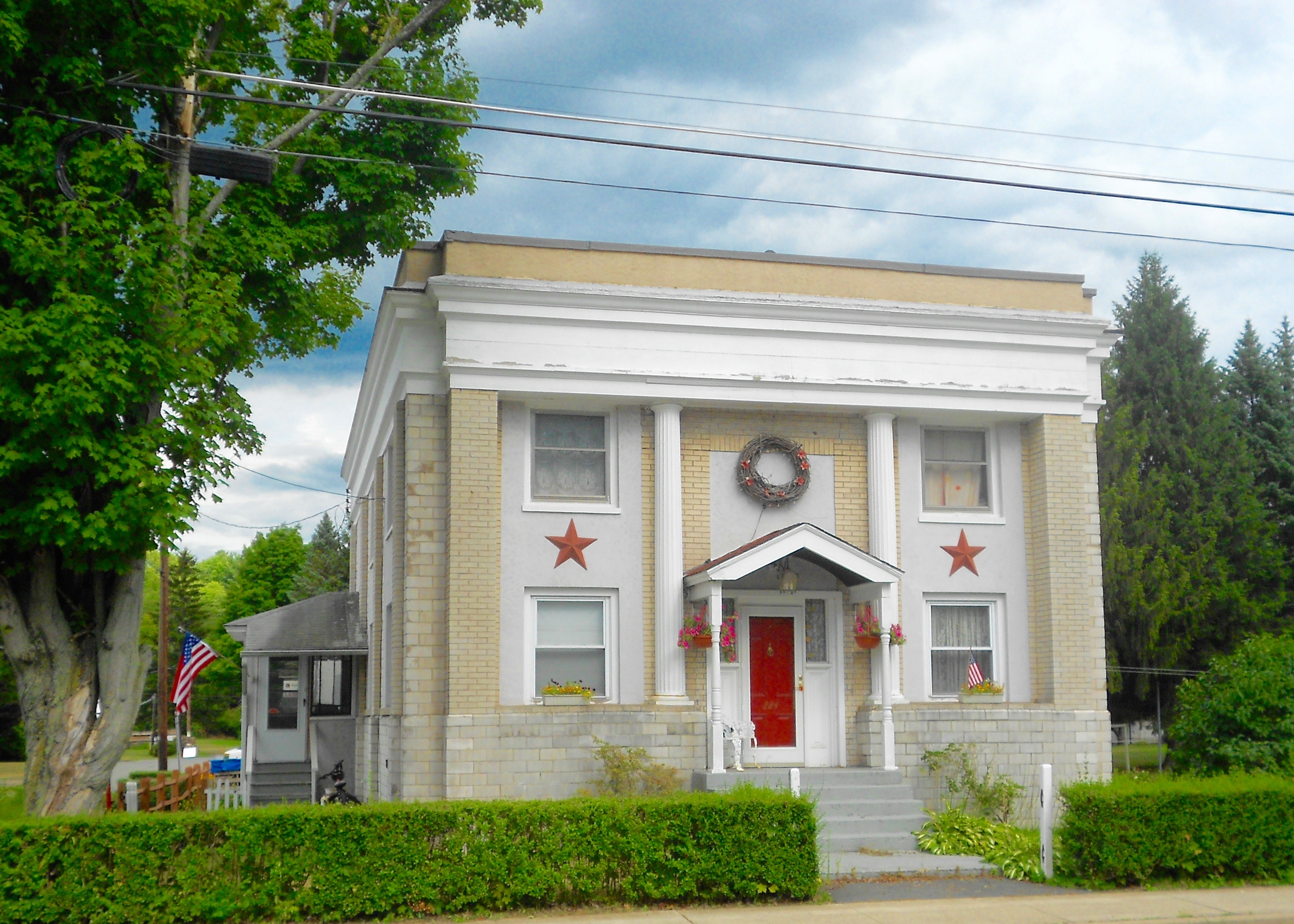
- House across from Wayside Park

- Location of Waymart in Wayne County (left) and of Wayne County in Pennsylvania (right)

- Location of Waymart in Pennsylvania Waymart (the United States)
- Coordinates: 41°34′51″N 75°24′25″W
- Country: United States
- State: Pennsylvania
- County: Wayne

Area
  - Total: 2.76 sq mi (7.14 km^{2})
  - Land: 2.69 sq mi (6.97 km^{2})
  - Water: 0.069 sq mi (0.18 km^{2})
- Elevation: 1,873 ft (571 m)

Population (2010)
  - Total: 1,341
  - Estimate (2019): 1,269
  - Density: 471.6/sq mi (182.07/km^{2})
- Time zone: UTC-5 (EST)
  - Summer (DST): UTC-4 (EDT)
- ZIP Code: 18472
- Area code: 570
- FIPS code: 42-81712
- Website: Borough website

Waymart is a borough in Wayne County, Pennsylvania, United States. Waymart is a small town in the Pocono Mountains of Pennsylvania known for its railroading history, Coal Country roots, and outdoor recreation. As of the 2020 census, Waymart had a population of 1,297.

== Geography ==
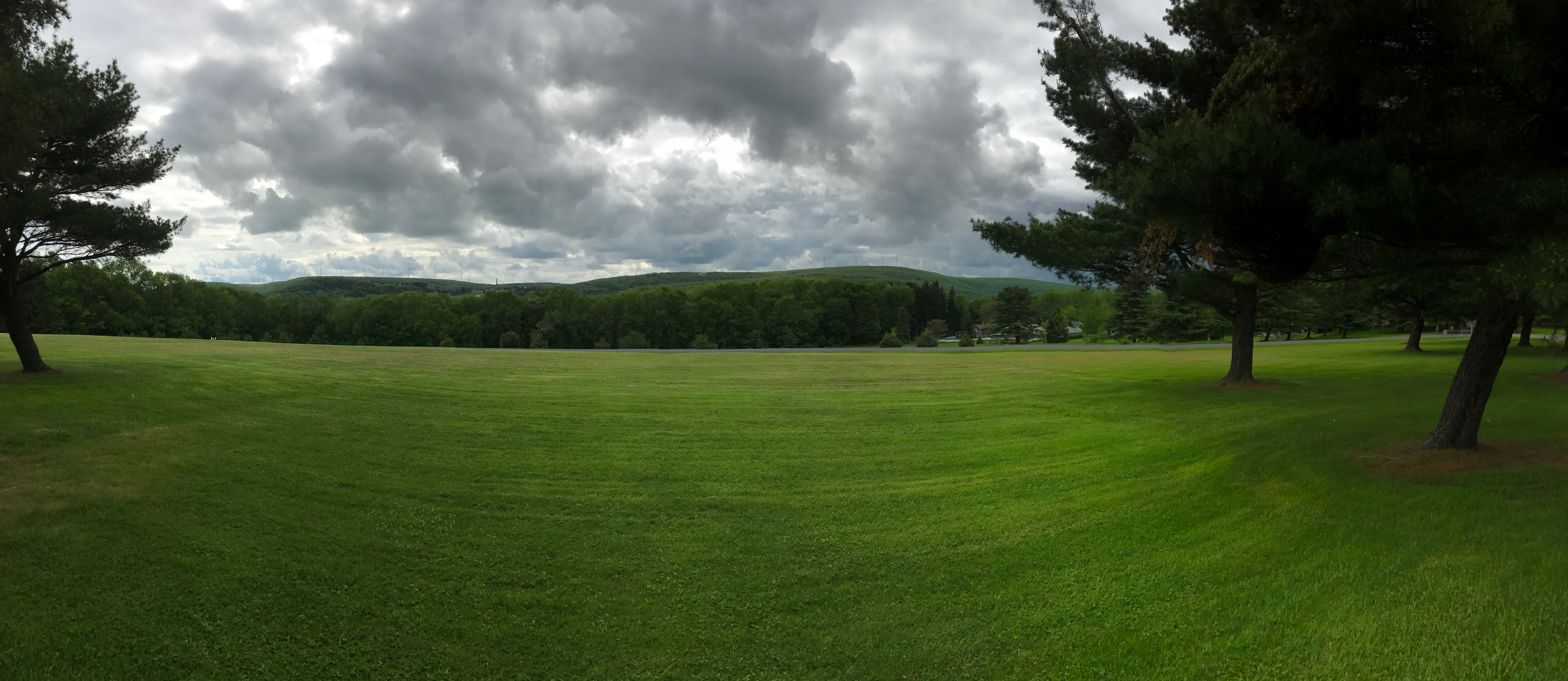
Waymart

Waymart is located at 41°34′51″N 75°24′25″W (41.580959, -75.406826) in The Pocono Mountains region. Founded as a Borough in 1851. According to the U.S. Census Bureau, Waymart has a total area of 2.8 square miles (7.3 km^{2}), 2.7 square miles (7.0 km^{2}) of which is land and 0.1 square miles (0.26 km^{2}) (3.57%) of which is water.

== Demographics ==
Historical population
Census	Pop.	Note	%±
1860	539		—
1870	567		5.2%
1880	503		−11.3%
1890	438		−12.9%
1900	432		−1.4%
1910	412		−4.6%
1920	507		23.1%
1930	902		77.9%
1940	1,095		21.4%
1950	1,068		−2.5%
1960	1,106		3.6%
1970	1,122		1.4%
1980	1,248		11.2%
1990	1,337		7.1%
2000	1,429		6.9%
2010	1,341		−6.2%
2020	1,297		−3.3%
2023 (est.)	1,290	▼	−0.5%

As of the 2000 census, there were 1,429 people, 492 households, and 344 families residing in the borough. The population density was 516.3 inhabitants per square mile (199.3/km^{2}). There were 515 housing units at an average density of 186.1 per square mile (71.9/km^{2}). The racial makeup of the borough was 98.67% White, 0.49% African American, 0.28% Native American, 0.07% from other races, and 0.49% from two or more races. Hispanic or Latino of any race were 1.19% of the population.

There were 492 households, out of which 33.3% had children under the age of 18 living with them, 53.7% were married couples living together, 12.2% had a female householder with no husband present, and 29.9% were non-families. 28.0% of all households were made up of individuals, and 14.0% had someone living alone who was 65 years of age or older. The average household size was 2.56 and the average family size was 3.10.

In Waymart, the population was spread out, with 24.4% under the age of 18, 5.5% from 18 to 24, 24.4% from 25 to 44, 20.6% from 45 to 64, and 25.1% who were 65 years of age or older. The median age was 42 years. For every 100 females there were 78.8 males. For every 100 females age 18 and over, there were 69.5 males.

The median income for a household in the borough was $35,208, and the median income for a family was $40,417. Males had a median income of $30,395 versus $19,583 for females. The per capita income for the borough was $14,498. About 8.1% of families and 12.3% of the population were below the poverty line, including 11.0% of those under age 18 and 20.7% of those age 65 or over.

== Government and infrastructure ==
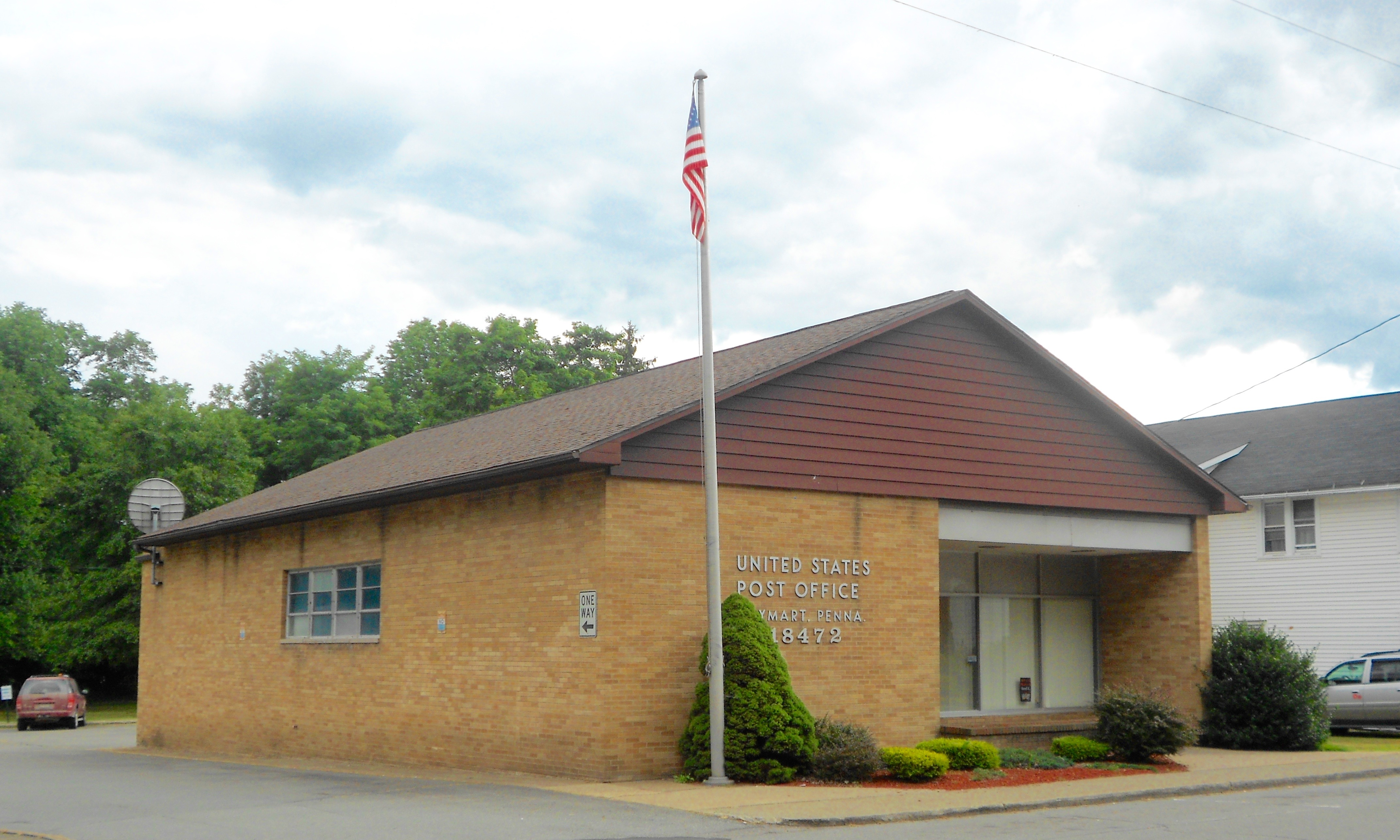
The Waymart post office

The U.S. Postal Service operates the Waymart Post Office. The Federal Bureau of Prisons United States Penitentiary, Canaan is in Canaan Township, near Waymart. The Pennsylvania Department of Corrections runs the State Correctional Institution – Waymart in Waymart.

== Education ==
The school district is Western Wayne School District.
