= Big Wapwallopen Creek =

Creek in Pennsylvania, United States

Big Wapwallopen Creek Wapwallopen Creek, Big Wap
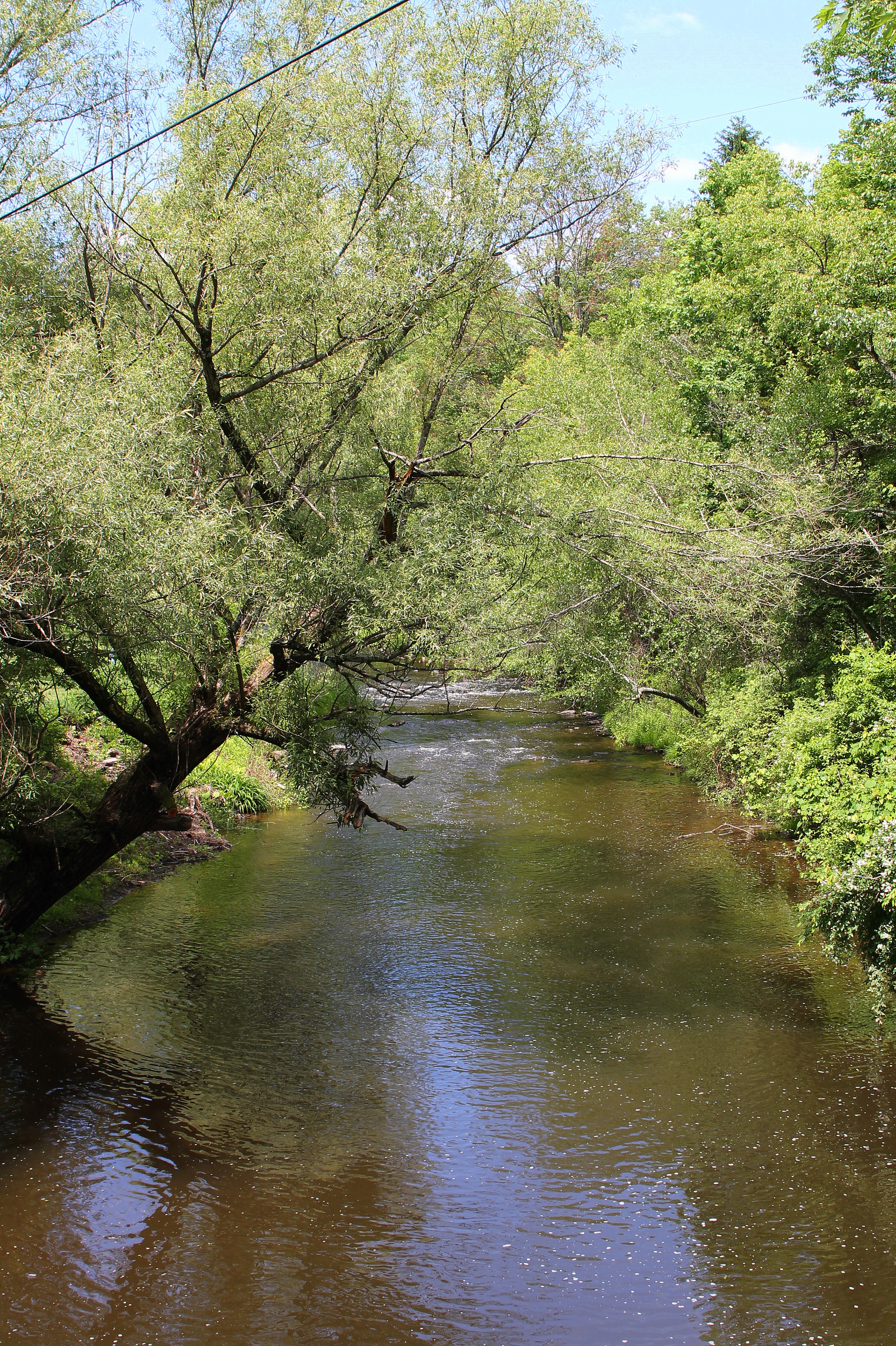
- Big Wapwallopen Creek in Hollenback Township in June 2015
- Etymology: nearby Native American village

Physical characteristics
- Source
  - location: Crystal Lake in Bear Creek Township, Pennsylvania
  - elevation: between 1,920 and 1,940 feet (590 and 590 m)
- Mouth
  - location: Susquehanna River on the border between Conyngham Township, Luzerne County, Pennsylvania and Nescopeck Township, Pennsylvania
  - coordinates: 41°04′22″N 76°08′06″W
  - elevation: 495 ft (151 m)
- Length: 23 mi (37 km)
- Basin size: 53.2 mi^{2} (138 km^{2})
- Discharge
  - average: 52.3 cu ft/s (1.48 m^{3}/s) (average annual discharge, 2013)

Basin features
- Progression: Susquehanna River → Chesapeake Bay
- Tributaries
  - left: Bow Creek, Watering Run, Balliet Run

Big Wapwallopen Creek (also known as Wapwallopen Creek or Big Wap) is a tributary of the Susquehanna River in Luzerne County, Pennsylvania, in the United States. It is approximately 23 miles (37 km) long and flows through Bear Creek Township, Fairview Township, Rice Township, Wright Township, Dorrance Township, Hollenback Township, Nescopeck Township, and Conyngham Township. The watershed of the creek has an area of 53.2 square miles (138 km^{2}). The creek has three named tributaries: Balliet Run, Watering Run, and Bow Creek. The creek is designated as a Coldwater Fishery and a Migratory Fishery and is also Class A Wild Trout Waters for part of its length. However, a portion is considered to be impaired by organic enrichment and/or low levels of dissolved oxygen and its pH ranges from moderately acidic to slightly alkaline.

Big Wapwallopen Creek has three large waterfalls, all of which are more than 25 feet (7.6 m) high. The creek flows through the Wapwallopen Gorge in its lower reaches, where it descends 210 feet (64 m). It mainly flows through rock formations consisting of sandstone and shale. The creek has existed for several million years, but the portion of its course that flows through the Wapwallopen Gorge is less than 20,000 years old. The creek's watershed is mainly rural and most of it is forested. It is the main source of flooding in six townships.

Wapwallopen Creek is named after a Native American village that historically existed on the creek. The Delaware tribe inhabited the area by 1675 and the Shawnee tribe also historically inhabited the area. Numerous mills were built on the creek in the 1700s and 1800s, including two powder mills in the Wapwallopen Gorge. The second powder mill was built in 1859 by E.I. Du Pont de Nemours and Company and was one of the largest powder mills in the United States at the time. That powder mill operated until 1912. Numerous bridges were built across the creek in the 1900s. The Wapwallopen Gorge is listed on the Luzerne County Natural Areas Inventory. It is possible to canoe on 10.3 miles (16.6 km) of the creek, but there are some unrunnable points.

== Course ==
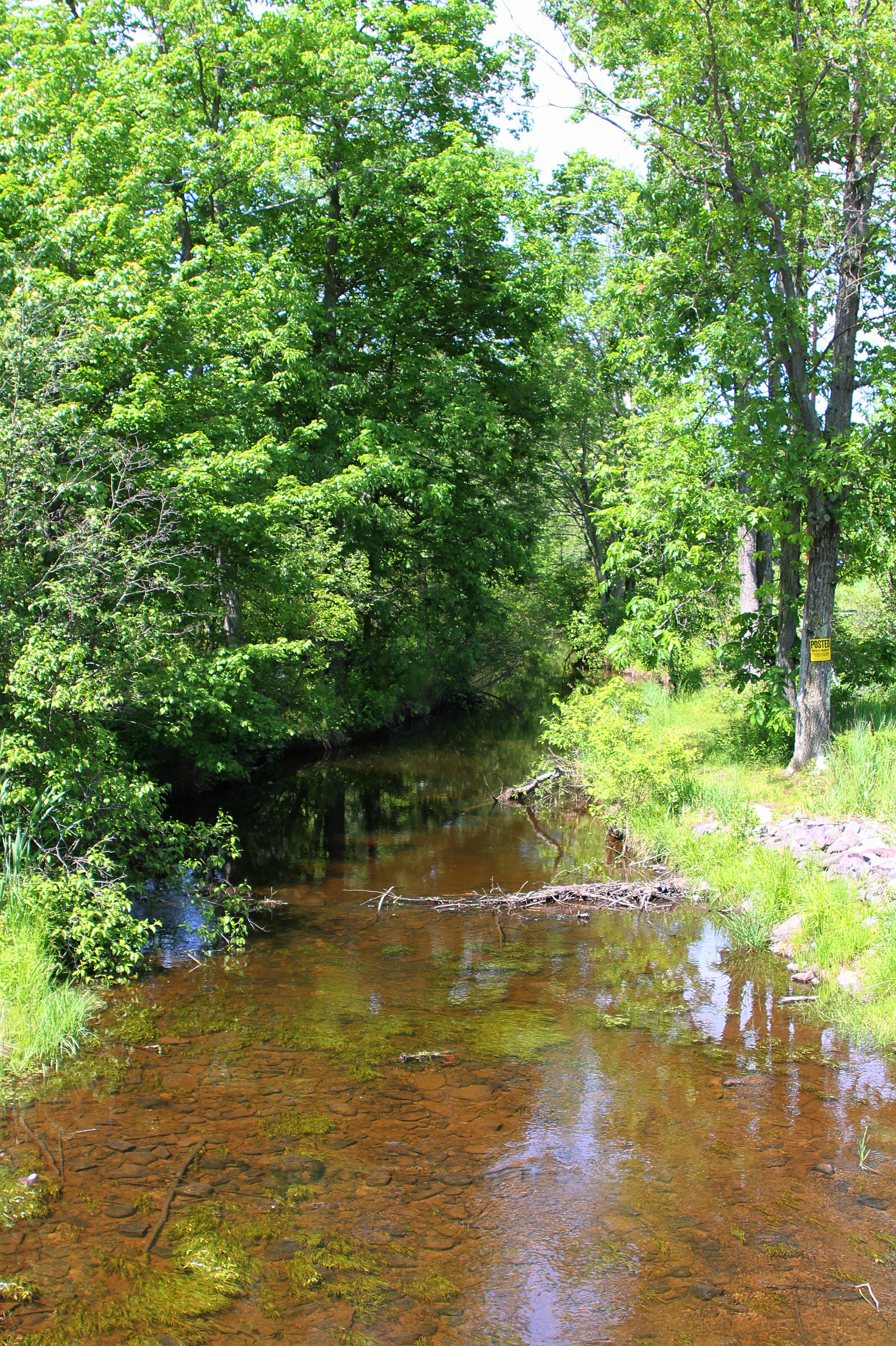
Big Wapwallopen Creek looking upstream in its upper reaches, about 5 miles (8.0 km) downstream of its source

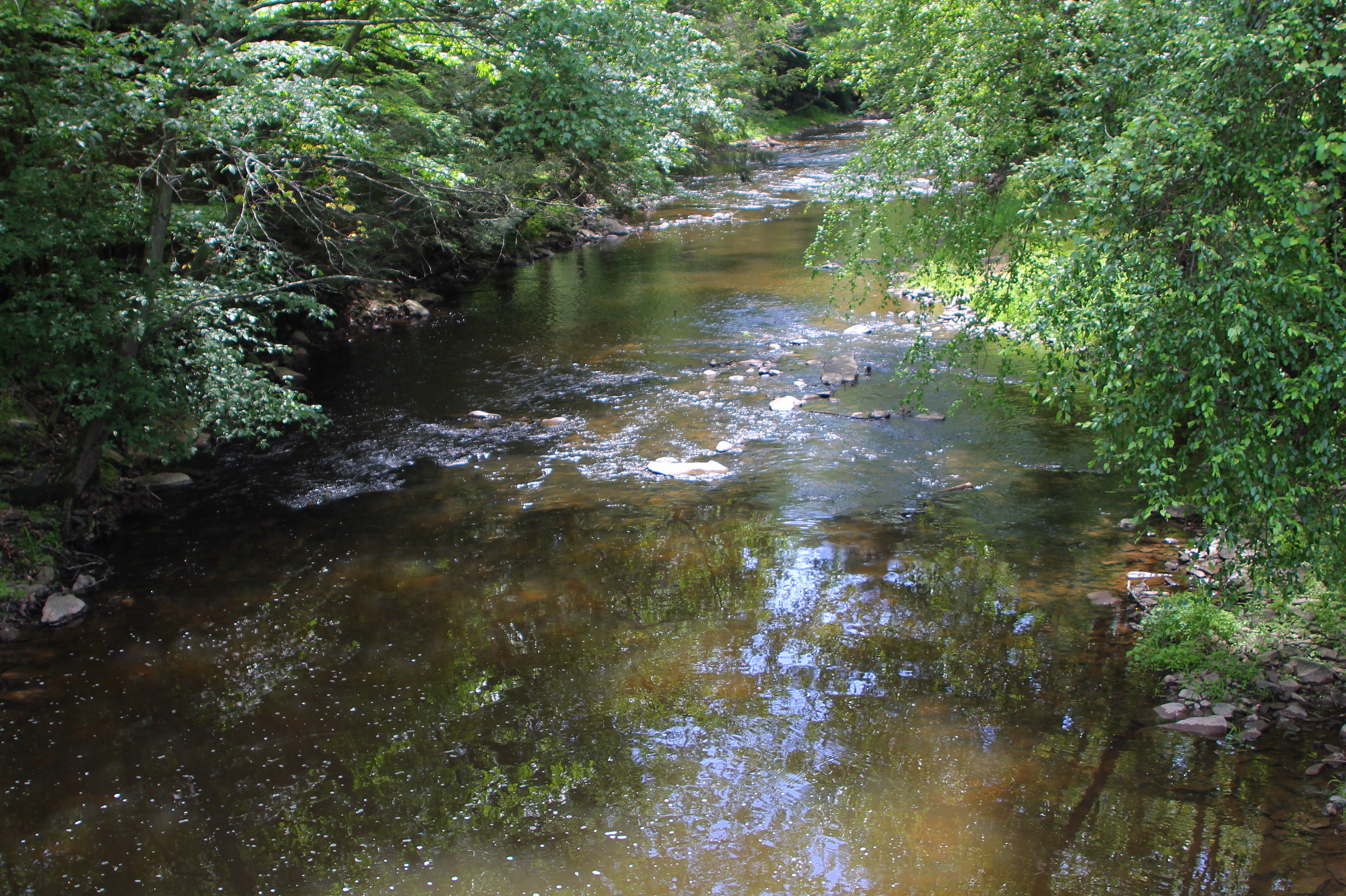
Big Wapwallopen Creek looking downstream in June 2015 in its lower reaches

Big Wapwallopen Creek begins in Crystal Lake in Bear Creek Township. It flows west for several tenths of a mile and enters Fairview Township. The creek turns west-southwest for approximately a mile, passing Arbutus Peak to the south and crossing Pennsylvania Route 437. It then turns west-northwest for several tenths of a mile before turning southwest and then west, crossing Pennsylvania Route 309. It passes through Pole Bridge Swamp and begins flowing along the border between Rice Township and Wright Township. Over the next couple of miles, the creek gradually turns south-southwest, still following the township line. It then passes through Hickory Swale and receives Bow Creek, its first named tributary, from the left. It turns southwest for several tenths of a mile before turning south and then southwest. It then turns west for more than a mile before turning southwest for a few miles, receiving the tributary Watering Run from the left before entering Dorrance Township and crossing Interstate 81. The creek then turns south for a few tenths of a mile before turning west and then southwest for a few miles, passing Feys Grove. It eventually turns west-southwest and enters Hollenback Township. After a few miles, the creek turns south for a short distance and receives Balliet Run, its last named tributary, from the left. It then turns west-northwest for more than a mile before turning south. At this point, the creek turns west again and enters a gorge. After several tenths of a mile, it turns north again, still flowing through the gorge and crossing the border between Hollenback Township and Nescopeck Township several times. The creek then turns west-northwest and begins flowing along the border between Nescopeck Township and Conyngham Township. After approximately a mile, it leaves the gorge and crosses Pennsylvania Route 239. It then reaches its confluence with the Susquehanna River just southwest of Wapwallopen.

Big Wapwallopen Creek joins the Susquehanna River 166.64 miles (268.18 km) upriver of its mouth.

=== Tributaries ===
Big Wapwallopen Creek has three named tributaries: Balliet Run, Watering Run, and Bow Creek. The creek also has numerous unnamed tributaries. Balliet Run joins Big Wapwallopen Creek 5.18 miles (8.34 km) upstream of its mouth. Its watershed has an area of 7.23 square miles (18.7 km^{2}). Watering Run joins Big Wapwallopen Creek 8.46 miles (13.62 km) upstream of its mouth. Its watershed has an area of 3.87 square miles (10.0 km^{2}). Bow Creek joins Big Wapwallopen Creek 11.90 miles (19.15 km) upstream of its mouth. Its watershed has an area of 4.69 square miles (12.1 km^{2}). Two unnamed tributaries of Big Wapwallopen Creek include "Big Wapwallopen Creek Tributary E" and "Big Wapwallopen Creek Tributary H". Their watersheds have areas of 3.61 and 3.40 square miles (9.3 and 8.8 km^{2}), respectively.

== Hydrology ==
A portion of the Big Wapwallopen Creek was considered impaired according to the EPA in its "2004 Waterbody Report for Big Wapwallopen Creek." The cause of the impairment is organic enrichment and/or low levels of dissolved oxygen. The creek has a United States Geological Survey stream gage near Wapwallopen.

The concentration of dissolved oxygen in Big Wapwallopen Creek near its mouth in 1975 and 1976 ranged from 9.4 to 13.0 milligrams per liter (0.0094 to 0.0130 oz/cu ft). The concentration of hydrogen ions ranged from 0.00003 to 0.00127 milligrams per liter (3.0×10^{−8} to 1.269×10^{−6} oz/cu ft) milligrams per liter in December 1975 and February to August 1976 and the concentration of carbon dioxide ranged from 0.7 to 30 milligrams per liter (0.00070 to 0.02997 oz/cu ft) during the same time period. Between December 1975 and August 1976, the ammonia concentration ranged from 0.026 to 0.090 milligrams per liter (2.6×10^{−5} to 9.0×10^{−5} oz/cu ft).

In the mid-1970s, the concentration of nitrogen in the form of nitrates in Big Wapwallopen Creek near its mouth ranged from 0.60 to 1.96 milligrams per liter (3.5×10^{−7} to 1.13×10^{−6} oz/cu in). The concentration of nitrogen in the form of nitrites ranged from 0.026 to 0.076 milligrams per liter (2.6×10^{−5} to 7.6×10^{−5} oz/cu ft). The phosphorus concentration ranged from 0.050 to 0.500 milligrams per liter (5.0×10^{−5} to 0.000499 oz/cu ft), the sulfate concentration ranged from 10.0 to 36.0 milligrams per liter (0.0100 to 0.0360 oz/cu ft), and the chloride concentration ranged from 6.0 to 13.0 milligrams per liter (0.0060 to 0.0130 oz/cu ft).

In 1975 and 1976, the calcium concentration in Big Wapwallopen Creek near its mouth ranged from 5.60 to 9.60 milligrams per liter (0.00559 to 0.00959 oz/cu ft). The magnesium concentration ranged between 0.50 and 5.50 milligrams per liter (0.00050 and 0.00549 oz/cu ft). The concentration of iron ranged from less than 10 to 3,150 micrograms per liter (5.8×10^{−9} to 1.8208×10^{−6} oz/cu in).

The turbidity of Big Wapwallopen Creek near its mouth was measured several times in 1975 and 1976. It ranged from less than one Jackson Turbidity Unit to 50 Jackson Turbidity Units. The specific conductance of the creek ranged from 70 to 100 micro-siemens per centimeter at 25 °C (77 °F). The creek's pH ranged from 5.9 to 7.5 in December 1975 and February to August 1976. The concentration of water hardness in the creek between December 1975 and August 1976 ranged from 12 to 42 milligrams per liter (0.012 to 0.042 oz/cu ft).

Between 1920 and 2013, the average annual discharge of Big Wapwallopen Creek at Wapwallopen was more than 100 cubic feet per second (2.8 m^{3}/s) five times: in 1928, in 1978, in 1994, in 2004, and in 2001. The average annual discharges in these years were 105.9 cubic feet per second (3.00 m^{3}/s), 108.3 cubic feet per second (3.07 m^{3}/s), 105.4 cubic feet per second (2.98 m^{3}/s), 100.2 cubic feet per second (2.84 m^{3}/s), and 141.1 cubic feet per second (4.00 m^{3}/s), respectively. The average annual discharge of the creek has been less than 40 cubic feet per second (1.1 m^{3}/s) four times: in 1931 and 1932, in 1965, and in 2001. The values in these years were 33.2 cubic feet per second (0.94 m^{3}/s), 36.9 cubic feet per second (1.04 m^{3}/s), 30.9 cubic feet per second (0.87 m^{3}/s) and 39.6 cubic feet per second (1.12 m^{3}/s). The average annual discharge of the creek in 2013 was 52.3 cubic feet per second (1.48 m^{3}/s)

The peak annual discharge of Big Wapwallopen Creek at its mouth has a 10 percent chance of reaching 3350 cubic feet per second. It has a 2 percent chance of reaching 6550 cubic feet per second and a 1 percent chance of reaching 8400 cubic feet per second. The peak annual discharge has a 0.2 percent chance of reaching 15,000 cubic feet per second. The peak annual discharge of the creek at the confluence of Balliet Run has a 10 percent chance of reaching 1900 cubic feet per second. It has a 2 percent chance of reaching 3050 cubic feet per second and a 1 percent chance of reaching 3600 cubic feet per second. The peak annual discharge has a 0.2 percent chance of reaching 5200 cubic feet per second.

The peak annual discharge of Big Wapwallopen Creek upstream of the tributary Watering Run has a 10 percent chance of reaching 1,220 cubic feet per second (35 m^{3}/s), a 2 percent chance of reaching 2,080 cubic feet per second (59 m^{3}/s), a 1 percent chance of reaching 2,530 cubic feet per second (72 m^{3}/s), and a 0.2 percent chance of reaching 3,770 cubic feet per second (107 m^{3}/s). The peak annual discharge of the creek upstream of the tributary Bow Creek has a 10 percent chance of reaching 588 cubic feet per second (16.7 m^{3}/s), a 2 percent chance of reaching 1,025 cubic feet per second (29.0 m^{3}/s), a 1 percent chance of reaching 1,253 cubic feet per second (35.5 m^{3}/s) and a 0.2 percent chance of reaching 1,904 cubic feet per second (53.9 m^{3}/s).

== Geography, geology, and climate ==
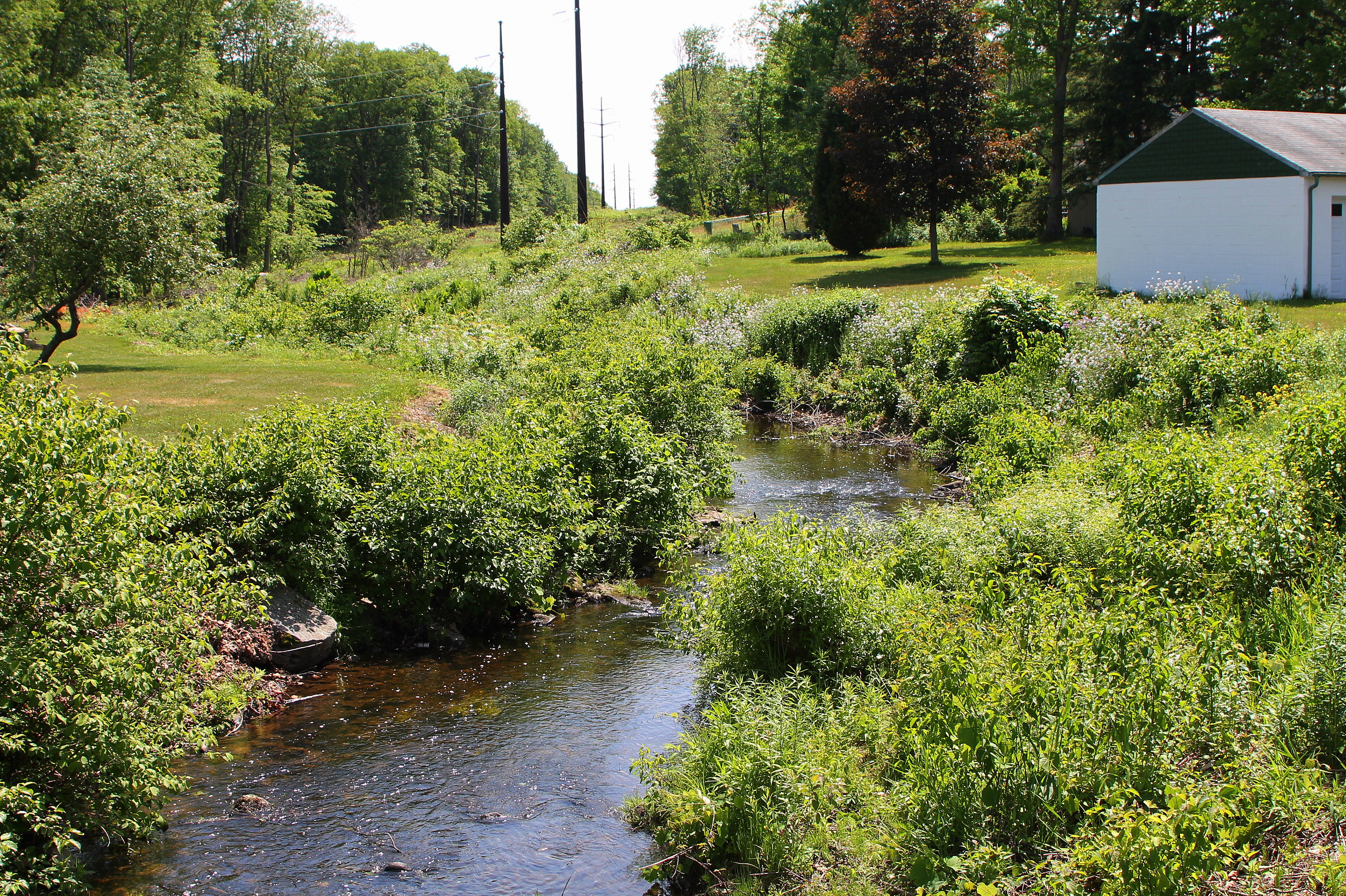
Big Wapwallopen Creek looking downstream in its upper reaches, about 5 miles (8.0 km) downstream of its source

The elevation near the mouth of Big Wapwallopen Creek is 495 feet (151 m) above sea level. The elevation of the creek's source is between 1,920 and 1,940 feet (590 and 590 m) above sea level. The gradient of the creek for its first 2 miles (3.2 km) is 257.5 feet per mile (48.77 m/km). For the next 14 miles (23 km) it is only 42.9 feet per mile (8.13 m/km). From there to the creek's mouth, the gradient is 69.8 feet per mile (13.22 m/km). The mean elevation of the creek's watershed upstream of State Route 3012/Hobbie Road is 1,330 feet (410 m) above sea level.

Big Wapwallopen Creek is in the ridge and valley physiographic province. It flows off the southwestern edge of the Pocono Plateau. Closer to its mouth, there are three large waterfalls on the creek. All of the waterfalls are more than 25 feet (7.6 m) high with the highest being 45 feet (14 m) high. The uppermost waterfall cuts through red sandstone. The falls are known as the Upper Falls, the Middle Falls, and the Lower Falls, respectively. Big Wapwallopen Creek has a long stretch of rapids formed from numerous small ledges and boulders. The creek flows through a gorge known as the Wapwallopen Gorge or (locally) as the Powder Hole. The gorge is in Conyngham Township, Hollenback Township, and Nescopeck Township. The creek drops a total of 210 feet (64 m) in the gorge. Within the gorge, there are large floodplains that are relatively forested and flat. The gorge was likely created several million years ago by the precursor to Big Wapwallopen Creek. However, the creek's original channel in this location was slightly to the west of its current one. It moved to its present channel 20,000 years ago, during the last Ice Age, when glaciers covered the area for a thousand years. Along most of the creek's length, it cut through glacial material to flow through its preglacial valley. However, at the site of the Wapwallopen Gorge it failed to do this and instead carved a new path through bedrock. The old glacial valley of Big Wapwallopen Creek was broad and gently sloping.

Big Wapwallopen Creek has been described as a small creek. The topography of the creek's watershed mainly consists of broken hills, with a few swamps and lakes. Nescopeck Mountain is on the watershed's southeastern border.

The channel of Big Wapwallopen Creek is sinuous and flows through rock formations consisting of sandstone and shale. The creek is surrounded by steep, high hills with a height of 200 to 300 feet (61 to 91 m) for its last 2 miles (3.2 km). In the Wapwallopen Gorge, it cuts through a rib of gray siltstone belonging to the Trimmers Rock Formation. This rock formation dates to 380 million years ago (the late Devonian) and covers the northern three quarters of the gorge. It mainly consists of gray siltstone, shale, and sandstone. The southern quarter of the gorge has bedrock consisting of the Irish Valley Member of the Catskill Formation. This formation contains siltstone, sandstone, shale, and claystone. The Soil Infiltration Index near the creek at State Route 3012/Hobbie Road is 3.51 inches (8.9 cm).

The Carbondale coal formation occurs near Big Wapwallopen Creek and also appears as far away as the Wyoming Valley. The coal formation is estimated to be 60 to 70 miles (97 to 113 km) long, several miles wide, and 20 to 25 feet (6.1 to 7.6 m) thick. It is lighter in color and burns more easily than the Mauch Chunk coal or the Lehigh Coal.

The annual rate of precipitation in the watershed of Big Wapwallopen Creek ranges from 35 to 45 inches (89 to 114 cm). The average rate of precipitation where the creek crosses State Route 3012/Hobbie Road is 41.60 inches (105.7 cm) per year and the average rate for the whole drainage basin is 44 inches (110 cm) per year. A precipitation intensity of 2.80 inches (7.1 cm) in 24 hours is expected to occur at this site once every two years. The water temperature of the creek was measured several times from late 1975 to 1976. The values ranged from 0.0 °C (32.0 °F) in January 1976 to 26.0 °C (78.8 °F) in August 1976. The rate of groundwater recharge in the creek's watershed is 14.2 inches (36 cm) per year, or 32 percent of the annual precipitation rate. It ranges from 218 to 721 gallons per minute per square mile, with an average of 469 gallons per minute per square mile. The rate of evapotranspiration ranges from 16.57 to 41.85 inches (42.1 to 106.3 cm) per year, with an average of 23.73 inches (60.3 cm) per year.

== Watershed ==
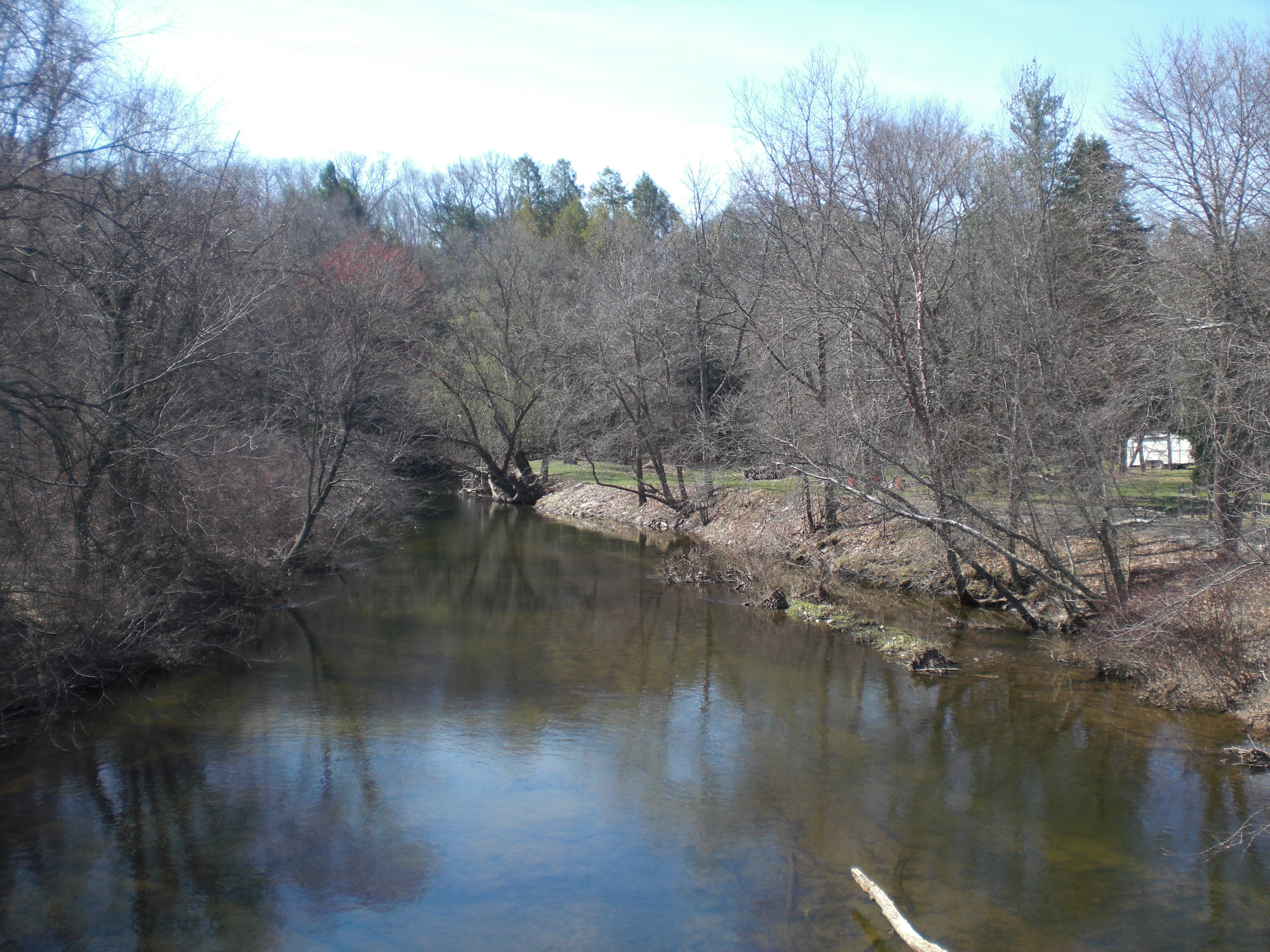
Big Wapwallopen Creek in its lower reaches

The watershed of Big Wapwallopen Creek has an area of 53.2 square miles (138 km^{2}). At the confluence of the tributary Balliet Run, its watershed has an area of 32.74 square miles (84.8 km^{2}). Upstream of the tributary Watering Run, its watershed has an area of 14.52 square miles (37.6 km^{2}) and upstream of the tributary Bow Creek, its watershed has an area of only 7.30 square miles (18.9 km^{2}). The mouth of the creek is in the United States Geological Survey quadrangle of Berwick. However, the source is in the quadrangle of Wilkes-Barre East. The creek also passes through the quadrangles of Wilkes-Barre West, Freeland, and Sybertsville. The creek is in the Lower North Branch Susquehanna drainage basin and its watershed is in the south-central part of Luzerne County. It flows in a general southwesterly direction. A total of 84 percent of the upper 43.8 square miles (113 km^{2}) of the watershed is forested land. A total of 1 percent is storage land. The creek's mouth is located approximately 17 miles (27 km) to the southwest of the city of Wilkes-Barre. The community of Mountain Top is located at the headwaters of the creek. The historical community of Glen Summit Springs was also at the headwaters of the creek.

Big Wapwallopen Creek flows through a rural valley with steep slopes. The uppermost 4.7 miles (7.6 km) of Big Wapwallopen Creek are all on private land. A dammed reservoir with an area of 494 acres (200 ha) is located on the creek at its headwaters. This reservoir is known as Crystal Lake and it is primarily used as a public water supply. However, it is capable of reducing peak discharges on the creek in Fairview Township.

Big Wapwallopen Creek is one of the main sources of flooding in Rice Township and Wright Township. It is also a primary flooding source in Conyngham Township, Dorrance Township, Fairview Township, Hollenback Township, and Nescopeck Township. However, in Conyngham Township, a 100 year flood of the creek would only inundate a small and undeveloped area.

A tract of land known as American Legion Post 781 is in the vicinity of Big Wapwallopen Creek in Wright Township. The tract is owned by the North Branch Land Trust and has an area of 254.5 acres (103.0 ha). The watershed of the creek is 2 miles (3.2 km) away from the planned Bell Bend Nuclear Power Plant. The two sites are separated by the Susquehanna River.

The designated use of Big Wapwallopen Creek is use for aquatic life.

== History ==
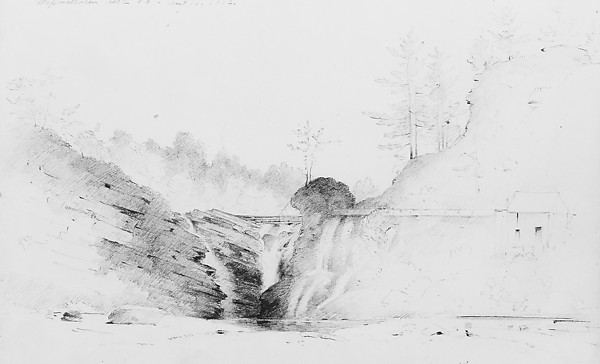
1852 drawing of Big Wapwallopen Creek by Thomas Addison Richards

Big Wapwallopen Creek was entered into the Geographic Names Information System on August 2, 1979. Its identifier in the Geographic Names Information System is 1192144. The creek is also known as Wapwallopen Creek or Big Wap.'

Big Wapwallopen Creek is named after a Native American village on the Susquehanna River near the creek. The Delaware and Shawnee tribes historically had camps and wigwams on the creek. The Delaware tribe was hunting and fishing in the vicinity of the creek's watershed as early as 1675.

The first land grant in Nescopeck Township was located to the west of Big Wapwallopen Creek. It was known as the Campania Tract and it was surveyed to Daniel Grant in 1769. The tract was patented to George Campbell in 1773. Prince Maximilian of Wied visited the area near the creek during his travels in North America.

Nathan Beach constructed a mill on Big Wapwallopen Creek in the Wapwallopen Gorge in 1795. The mill eventually burned down by accident. Cornelius Garrison built a mill on the creek in southwestern Wright Township in 1833. A mill owned by Samuel Heller was operational on the creek as late as the late 1800s. In 1856, William Silver also built a powder mill in the Wapwallopen Gorge. He then sold partial ownership of the mill to G.P. Parrish. However, early in 1859, a freshet and an explosion destroyed the mill and caused Silver's and Parrish's company went bankrupt. E.I. Du Pont de Nemours and Company bought the site in April 1859 and constructed the powder mills known as the Wapwallopen Mills there. At that time, the mills were one of the largest powder mills in the United States. While the mills were in operation, there were fatal explosions every eight years and the infrastructure was destroyed by flooding numerous times. However, by 1868, the mills were producing 70,000 tons of black powder per year. The mills operated until 1912, when the Du Pont company moved the machinery to Moosic due to increasing costs of shipping black powder and also a desire to consolidate operations. Only ruins remain today. There were still some gristmills on the creek as late as 1955.

The artist Thomas Addison Richards created a graphite-on-wove-paper drawing of Big Wapwallopen Creek in 1852. The Crystal Spring Water Company was chartered on April 11, 1861. It got its water supply from the upper reaches of the watershed of Big Wapwallopen Creek. In the 1800s, F.K. Miller constructed a tannery on a tributary of the creek in southeastern Dorrance Township. By 1865, the community of Dorrance had a gristmill, four sawmills, and a tavern on the creek.

Historically, there was a timbering industry in the watershed of Big Wapwallopen Creek. It was carried out by J.C. Patterson. However, the timbering was completed by the 1870s on several properties. In the early 1900s, the main industry in the watershed of Big Wapwallopen Creek was agriculture. However, the creek's main stem and Crystal Lake were used as a water supply by the Spring Brook Water Supply Company. A small hydroelectric plant and several mills operated in the lower reaches of the creek. In the early 1900s, the main population centers in the watershed included Wapwallopen, Hobbie, and Briggsville. Their populations were 450, 113, and 60, respectively. The Lehigh Valley Railroad and the Central Railroad of New Jersey historically passed through the upper part of the creek's watershed and the Wilkes-Barre and Hazleton Railway also passed through the creek's drainage basin. The Albert Methodist Church was moved from the Powder Glen near Wapwallopen in the early 1900s and dedicated in 1927.

In March 1936, Big Wapwallopen Creek flooded in Rice Township to a depth of 18 inches (46 cm) over Nuangola Road. The two largest floods in Hollenback Township occurred in August 1955 and June 1972. During these flooding events, discharge of Big Wapwallopen Creek at the Hobbie Road Bridge was 3140 and 5410 cubic feet per second, respectively. The gage heights were 9.23 and 11.04 feet (2.81 and 3.36 m), respectively. The floodwaters reached a depth of 2 feet (0.61 m) on Hobbie Road and many nearby homes were flooded.

A metal truss bridge carries T-392/Faux Road over Big Wapwallopen Creek. It is 44.0 feet (13.4 m) long. A masonry arch bridge with a length of 26.9 feet (8.2 m) was built across the creek in 1897 and repaired in 1963. Another metal truss bridge was built over the creek in 1908 and is 85.0 feet (25.9 m) long. Three concrete tee beam bridges with lengths of 40.0 feet (12.2 m), 42.0 feet (12.8 m), and 46.9 feet (14.3 m) were constructed over the creek in 1925 and the third was repaired in 1963. A concrete slab bridge with a length of 29.9 feet (9.1 m) was built across the creek in 1930 and a concrete tee beam with a length of 34.1 feet (10.4 m) was built over the creek in 1957. A prestressed box beam or girders bridge with a length of 68.9 feet (21.0 m) was built over it in 1958. Another bridge of the same type, but with two spans and a length of 99.1 feet (30.2 m) was built over the creek in 1961.

Two prestressed box beam or girders bridges with three spans were built across Big Wapwallopen Creek in 1965 and repaired in 1982. Both carried Interstate 81 and were 144.0 feet (43.9 m) long. A concrete culvert bridge carrying Pennsylvania Route 239 was built over the creek in 1970. This bridge is 65.0 feet (19.8 m) long. A prestressed box beam or girders bridge with a length of 37.1 feet (11.3 m) was built over the creek in 1993. A prestressed box beam or girders bridge with a length of 44.0 feet (13.4 m) was constructed across the creek in 1996.

The Big Wapwallopen Creek Watershed Association is based on Dorrance.

== Biology ==
The drainage basin of Big Wapwallopen Creek is designated by the Pennsylvania Department of Environmental Protection as a Coldwater Fishery and a Migratory Fishery. Wild trout naturally reproduce in the creek from its headwaters downstream to its mouth. They also do so in all three of the creek's named tributaries. A 4.7-mile (7.6 km) long stretch of the creek from Crystal Lake to a powerline crossing upstream of Nuangola Road is designated as Class A Wild Trout Waters for both brook trout and brown trout. The tributaries Bow Creek and Balliet Run are also Class A Wild Trout Waters.

Big Wapwallopen Creek is stocked with trout. It was stocked with rainbow trout a month before the fishing season in 2014, on March 5. It has also been stocked with brook trout at times. Minnows and suckers have been observed within the creek.

A major fish kill occurred in Big Wapwallopen Creek in 1967. A tank of a caustic substance was accidentally overturned and its contents spilled into the creek, polluting it for a stretch running from approximately 2.5 miles (4.0 km) from the tributary Bow Creek to Legion Road/Legislative Route 40112. Approximately 4000 fish were killed, most of them minnows, suckers, and trout.

Hemlock trees form a canopy over Big Wapwallopen Creek in some places. The Wapwallopen Gorge is listed as a Locally Significant site on the Luzerne County Natural Areas Inventory. Hemlock and yellow birch are common at the gorge's upper end. However, river birch and sycamore are more common at the lower end of the gorge. There are riparian forests along Big Wapwallopen Creek in the American Legion Post 781 land tract. The tract of land also contains some wet areas such as vernal pools and marshes. These areas provide breeding grounds for reptiles, amphibians, fish, and aquatic invertebrates.

== Recreation ==
It is possible to canoe on 10.3 miles (16.6 km) of Big Wapwallopen Creek during snowmelt or within two days of heavy rain. The difficulty rating ranges from 1 to 2+, though at least one of the waterfalls in the Wapwallopen Gorge is unrunnable. Edward Gertler's book Keystone Canoeing describes the scenery as "good to excellent" and describes the creek as "short and scenic" and a "clear brook". There are also hiking opportunities along the lower reaches of the creek.

There are also three swimming holes, known collectively as the Powder Hole, on Big Wapwallopen Creek. As of 2001, these have the highest injury and death rate of any swimming hole in the area. Between 1986 and 2001, at least three people died at the swimming holes and three others were severely injured.

A Jewish camp known as Camp Davidowitz was historically situated along Big Wapwallopen Creek. It was 16 miles (26 km) from Hazleton and had an area of 20 acres (8.1 ha).

The creek is designated as Approved Trout Waters from a powerline crossing upstream of Nuangola Road downstream to county road. In 2016, it opened for trout fishing on April 16.

== See also ==
- Walker Run, next tributary of the Susquehanna River going downriver
- Little Wapwallopen Creek, next tributary of the Susquehanna River going upriver
- List of rivers of Pennsylvania
