= Bow Creek (Big Wapwallopen Creek tributary) =

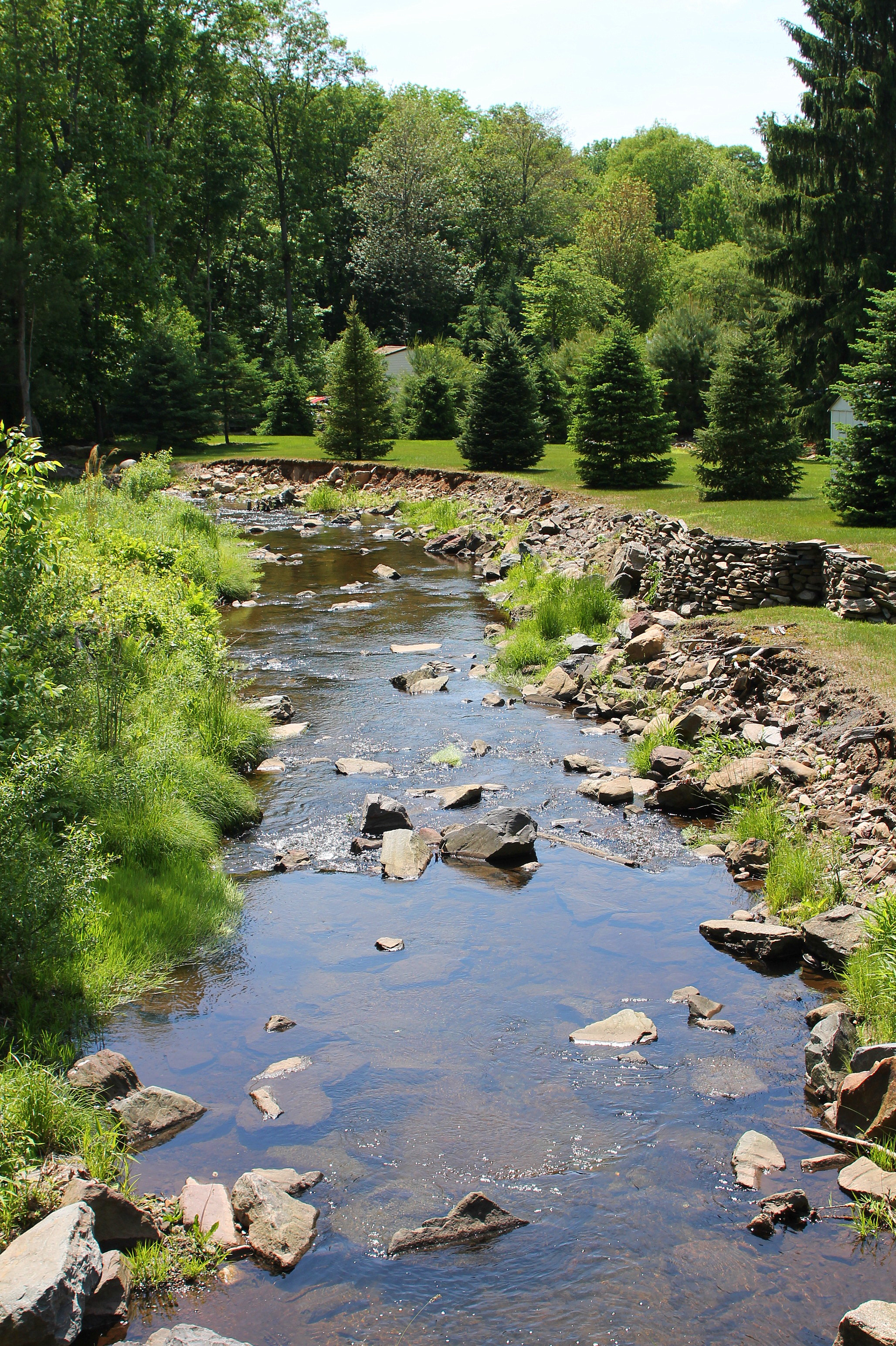
- Bow Creek looking downstream in its lower reaches

Physical characteristics
- Source
  - location: Arbutus Peak in Fairview Township, Luzerne County, Pennsylvania
  - elevation: between 1,920 and 1,940 feet (590 and 590 m)
- Mouth
  - location: Big Wapwallopen Creek in Fairview Township, Luzerne County, Pennsylvania
  - coordinates: 41°08′28″N 75°54′49″W
  - elevation: 1,227 ft (374 m)
- Length: 4.5 mi (7.2 km)
- Basin size: 4.69 mi^{2} (12.1 km^{2})
- Discharge
  - average: 550 cu ft/s (16 m^{3}/s) peak annual discharge at mouth (10% probability)

Basin features
- Progression: Big Wapwallopen Creek → Susquehanna River → Chesapeake Bay
- Tributaries
  - left: two unnamed tributaries
  - right: one unnamed tributary

Bow Creek is a tributary of Big Wapwallopen Creek in Luzerne County, Pennsylvania, in the United States. It is approximately 4.5 miles (7.2 km) long and flows through Fairview Township and Wright Township. The watershed of the creek has an area of 4.69 square miles (12.1 km^{2}). The creek has no named tributaries, but several unnamed ones, such as Bow Creek Tributary A. Bow Creek has been historically nearly devoid of life, but is now considered to be Class A Wild Trout Waters. There is a bridge carrying Pennsylvania Route 309 across the creek. Wisconsinan Till, alluvium, and bedrock consisting of sandstone, shale, conglomerate, and coal occur in the watershed. Several volatile organic compounds have been detected in small amounts in surface water in the watershed. The creek occasionally floods, but such flooding typically causes little damage.

== Course ==
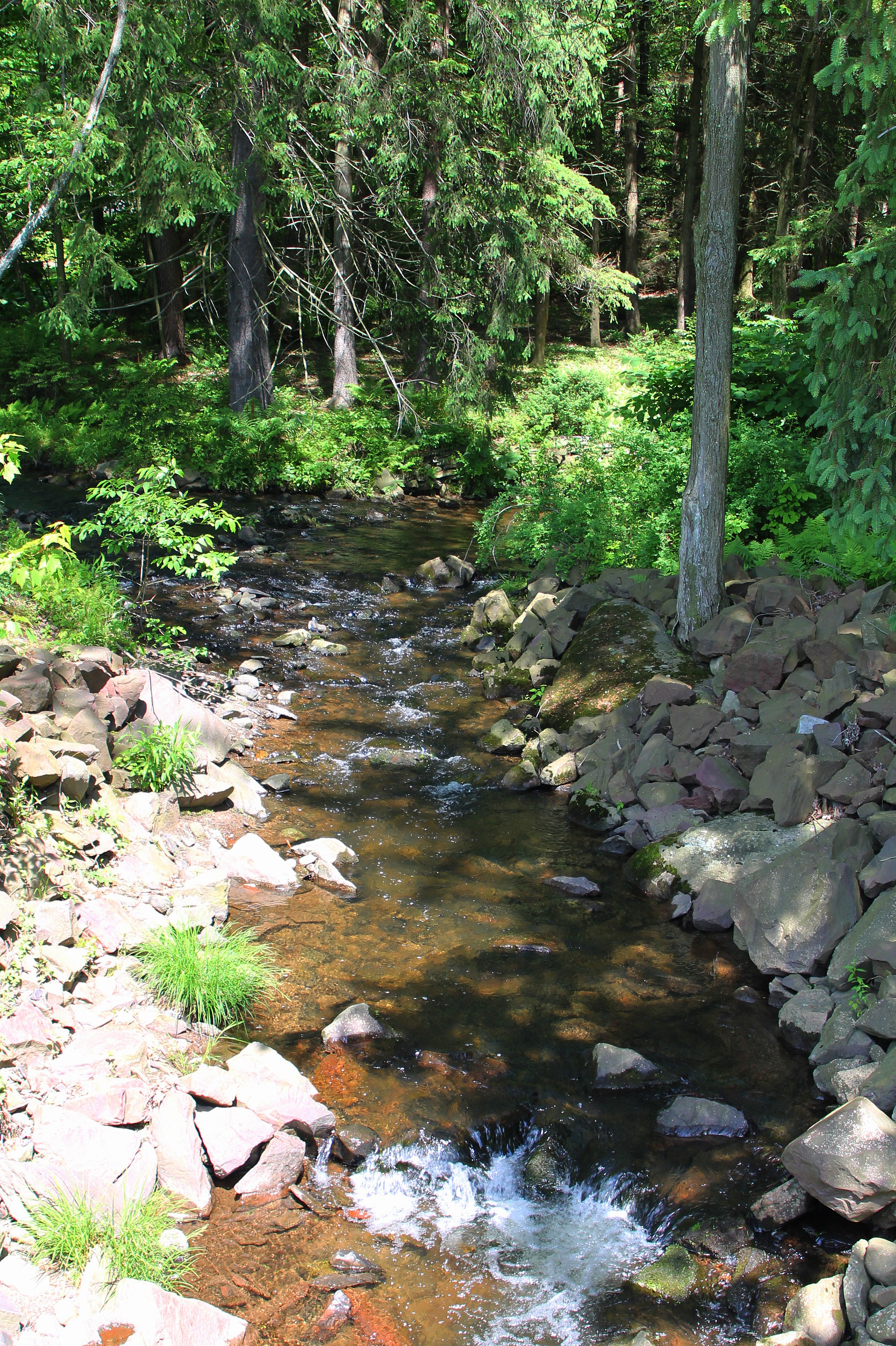
Bow Creek looking upstream in its lower reaches

Bow Creek begins on Arbutus Peak in Fairview Township. It flows south for several tenths of a mile until reaching the community of Glen Summit, where it turns west and crosses Pennsylvania Route 437. The creek then receives two unnamed tributaries from the left before briefly turning north and then turning back south again and continuing west-northwest. After several tenths of a mile, it enters Rice Township, receives an unnamed tributary from the right, and crosses Pennsylvania Route 309 before turning southwest for nearly a mile until it reaches its confluence with Big Wapwallopen Creek on the border between Wright Township and Rice Township.

Bow Creek joins Big Wapwallopen Creek 11.90 miles (19.15 km) upstream of its mouth.

=== Tributaries ===
Bow Creek has no named tributaries. However, it does have several unnamed tributaries. One of these is known as Bow Creek Tributary A. The watershed of this tributary has an area of 0.94 square miles (2.4 km^{2}).

== Hydrology ==
The concentration of alkalinity in the waters of Bow Creek is 10 milligrams per liter.

Three volatile organic compounds have been detected in surface water in the watershed of Bow Creek: 1,1-Dichloroethene, 1,2-Dichloroethene, and trichloroethene. The maximum observed concentrations of these compounds were 60 nanograms per liter, 3.6 micrograms per liter, and 24 micrograms per liter, respectively. Wastewater was discharged into the creek by the RCA in the 1970s.

The peak annual discharge of Bow Creek at its mouth has a 10 percent chance of reaching 550 cubic feet per second and a 2 percent chance of reaching 920 cubic feet per second. It has a 1 percent chance of reaching 1100 cubic feet per second and a 0.2 percent chance of reaching 1600 cubic feet per second. At the mouth of Bow Creek Tributary A, the peak annual discharge of Bow Creek has a 10 percent chance of reaching 352 cubic feet per second. It has a 2 percent chance of reaching 560 cubic feet per second, a 1 percent chance of reaching 675 cubic feet per second, and a 0.2 percent chance of reaching 1000 cubic feet per second.

At a location approximately 1,600 feet (490 m) upstream of Black Walnut Drive, the peak annual discharge of Bow Creek has a 10 percent chance of reaching 250 cubic feet per second. It has a 2 percent chance of reaching 430 cubic feet per second and 1 percent chance of reaching 520 cubic feet per second. The chance of the creek's discharge peaking at 770 cubic feet per second in any given year is 0.2 percent.

Part of Bow Creek was dry during the summer and early autumn of 2007.

== Geography and geology ==
The elevation near the mouth of Bow Creek is 1,227 feet (374 m) above sea level. The elevation near the stream's source is between 1,920 and 1,940 feet (590 and 590 m) above sea level.

The headwaters of Bow Creek are on a mountain known as Arbutus Peak.

The upper reaches of Bow Creek are mostly on a glacial or resedimented till known as the Wisconsinan Till. However, there are some areas containing bedrock consisting of sandstone, shale, conglomerate, and coal. The same is true in the lower reaches of the watershed, but there are also areas of alluvium along the creek near its mouth.

== Watershed ==
The watershed of Bow Creek has an area of 4.69 square miles (12.1 km^{2}). The stream's mouth is in the United States Geological Survey quadrangle of Wilkes-Barre West. However, its source is in the quadrangle of Wilkes-Barre East.

The entire length of Bow Creek is in private land. The creek and its unnamed tributary sometimes flood, but since their floodplains are in relatively undeveloped areas, such floods typically cause little damage. A wetland known as the Bow Creek Fen is located in the creek's watershed.

== History ==
Bow Creek was entered into the Geographic Names Information System on August 2, 1979. Its identifier in the Geographic Names Information System is 1170043.

In the early 1900s, the Luzerne County commissioners received approval to construct a bridge across Bow Creek in Wright Township. A concrete tee beam bridge carrying Pennsylvania Route 309 was constructed over Bow Creek in 1929. It is 27.9 feet (8.5 m) long and is located in Wright Township. In 2013, the bridge received a weight restriction of 28 tons (35 tons for combination loads).

In the 1970s, the Pennsylvania Department of Economic Resources had a significant amount of interest in Bow Creek. In addition to periodic stream surveys, they performed electrofishing surveys and determined diversity index values for benthos. A request was made in 2012 to redesignate Bow Creek and several dozen other streams as High Quality Coldwater Fisheries due to the fact that they already met the requirements for Class A Wild Trout Waters status.

== Biology ==
Bow Creek is considered by the Pennsylvania Fish and Boat Commission to be Class A Wild Trout Waters for both brook trout and brown trout from its headwaters to its mouth. A 298-acre tract of land owned by the North Branch Land Trust in Fairview Township contains a section of the creek that is said to be "teeming" with native brook trout. The main stem of the creek from Pennsylvania Route 309 to its mouth is designated as a Coldwater Fishery and a Migratory Fishery. However, its existing uses are High-Quality Coldwater Fishery and Migratory Fishery.

In the early 1970s, Bow Creek was nearly devoid of aquatic life and its streambed was covered in large populations of Sphaerotilus, a sewage bacterium. However, five years later, it was "a showplace" and a "cold-water trout stream" with substantial fish populations. The change was made over a three-year period by two teams, one consisting of state government environmentalists and one consisting of people from the industry.

== See also ==
- Watering Run, next tributary of Big Wapwallopen Creek going downstream
- List of rivers of Pennsylvania
