= Balliet Run =

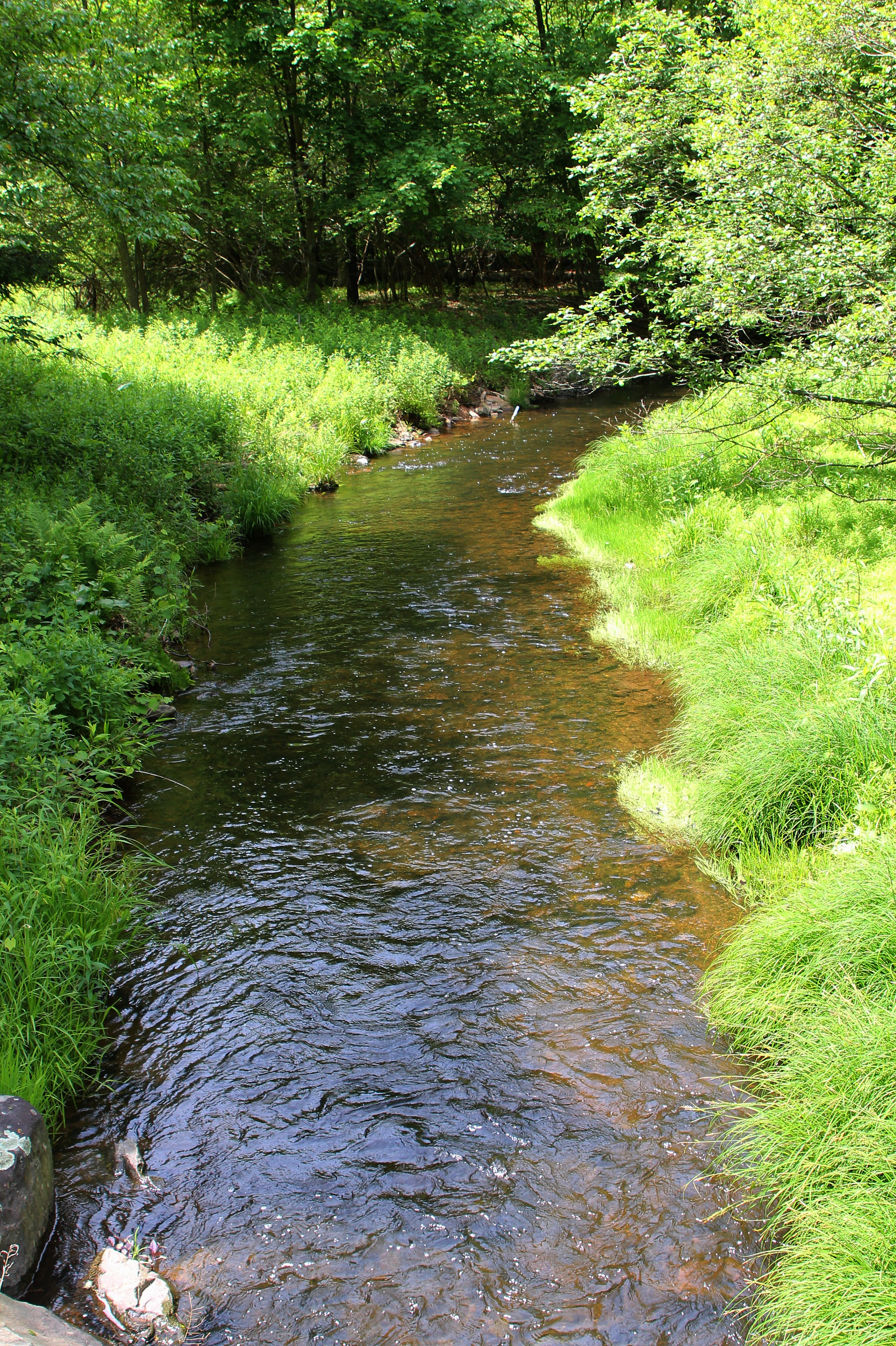
- Balliet Run near its mouth

Physical characteristics
- Source
  - location: base of Nescopeck Mountain, not far from Nescopeck Pass in Dorrance Township, Luzerne County, Pennsylvania
  - elevation: between 1,360 and 1,380 feet (410 and 420 m)
- Mouth
  - location: Big Wapwallopen Creek in Hollenback Township, Luzerne County, Pennsylvania
  - coordinates: 41°03′30″N 76°04′10″W
  - elevation: 801 ft (244 m)
- Length: 7.3 mi (11.7 km)
- Basin size: 7.23 mi^{2} (18.7 km^{2})
- Discharge
  - average: 780 cu ft/s (22 m^{3}/s) peak annual discharge, 10% probability

Basin features
- Progression: Big Wapwallopen Creek → Susquehanna River → Chesapeake Bay
- Tributaries
  - left: one unnamed tributary
  - right: one unnamed tributary

Balliet Run (also known as Balliet's Run) is a tributary of Big Wapwallopen Creek in Luzerne County, Pennsylvania, in the United States. It is approximately 7.3 miles (11.7 km) long and flows through Dorrance Township, Hollenback Township, and Butler Township. The watershed of the stream has an area of 7.23 square miles (18.7 km^{2}). The stream itself is fairly small and has two unnamed tributaries. It is considered to be Class A Wild Trout Waters and is inhabited by brook trout and brown trout. Wisconsinan Till, fill, and bedrock consisting of sandstone, conglomerate, and shale occur in the vicinity of the stream.

== Course ==
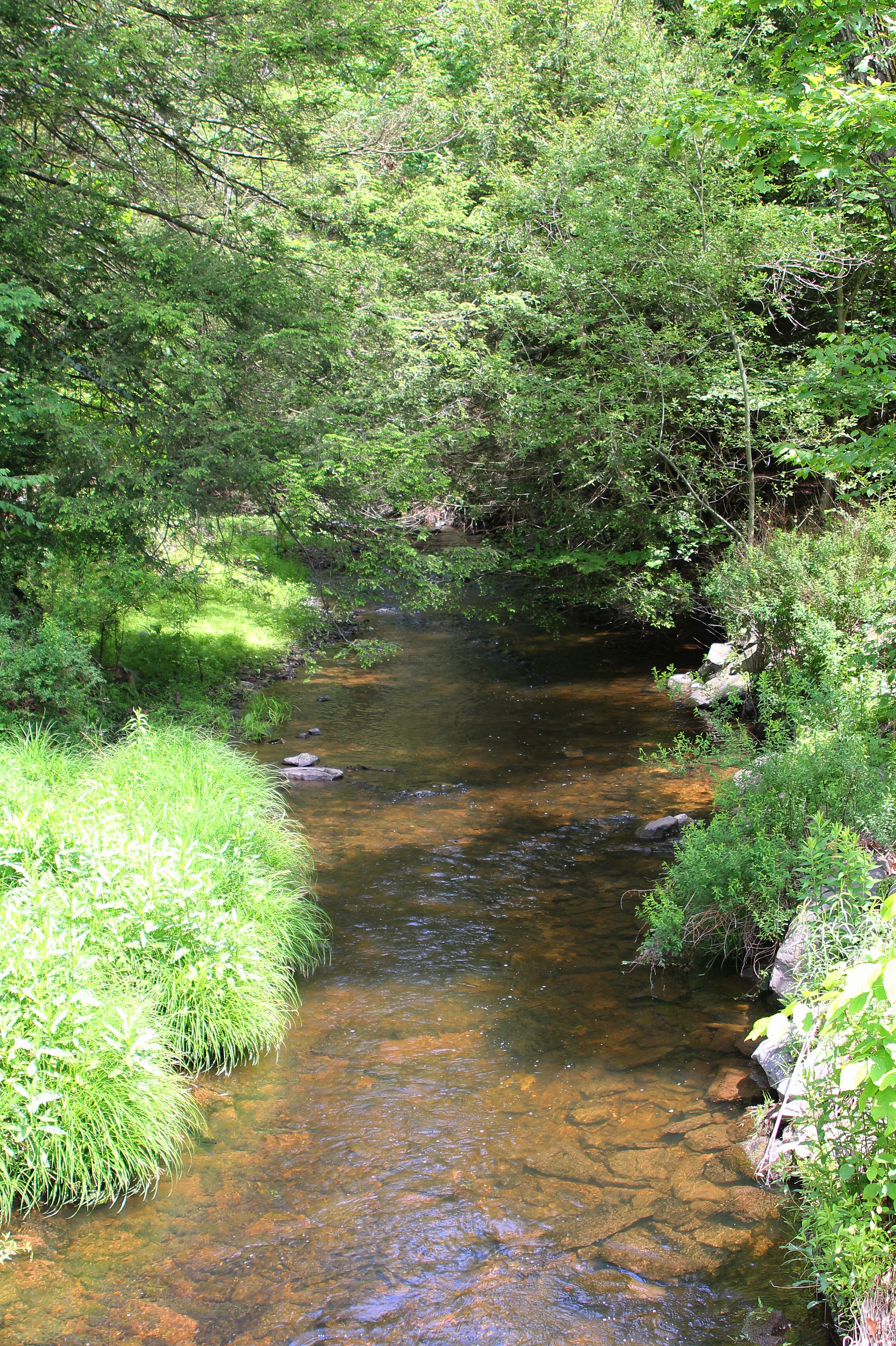
Balliet Run near its mouth

Balliet Run begins at the base of Nescopeck Mountain, not far from Nescopeck Pass in Dorrance Township. It flows west for a few tenths of a mile, crossing Interstate 81. The stream then turns west-southwest for several tenths of a mile before turning west and slightly south for a few miles along the northern side of Nescopeck Mountain, passing by Springtown along the way. It then turns northwest and away from Nescopeck Mountain for nearly a mile and receives an unnamed tributary from the right before turning west-southwest for approximately a mile and exiting Dorrance Township. Upon exiting Dorrance Township, the stream enters Hollenback Township. It turns south for a few tenths of a mile, approaching Nescopeck Mountain again and receiving an unnamed tributary from the left. The stream then turns west and then west-southwest, briefly entering Butler Township before reentering Hollenback Township. It then turns west-northwest for several tenths of a mile before turning southwest and then meandering west for a short distance to its confluence with Big Wapwallopen Creek.

Balliet Run joins Big Wapwallopen Creek 5.18 miles (8.34 km) upstream of its mouth.

=== Tributaries ===
Balliet Run has no named tributaries. However, it does have two unnamed tributaries. The first is 0.8 miles (1.3 km) long and the second is 1.5 miles (2.4 km) long.

== Hydrology ==
The peak annual discharge of Balliet Run has a 10 percent chance of reaching 780 cubic feet per second. It has a 2 percent chance of reaching 1300 cubic feet per second and 1 percent chance of reaching 1600 cubic feet per second. The stream's peak annual discharge has a 0.2 percent chance of reaching 2250 cubic feet per second.

The concentration of alkalinity in the waters of Balliet Run is 11 milligrams per liter.

A facility known as the YRC Wilkes Barre Terminal has a permit to discharge sewage into Balliet Run.

== Geography and geology ==
The elevation near the mouth of Balliet Run is 801 feet (244 m) above sea level. The elevation of the stream's source is between 1,360 and 1,380 feet (410 and 420 m) above sea level.

Balliet Run is a small stream and is said to resemble a mountain stream fed by springs. An article in Times Leader stated that "one gets the feeling that there is something special about the cool, clear water contained within its banks". The stream is on the northern side of Nescopeck Mountain.

Most of the upper reaches of Balliet Run are on a glacial or resedimented till known as Wisconsinan Till. However, fill is present in some small areas of the watershed, as is bedrock consisting of sandstone, conglomerate, and shale.

== Watershed ==
The watershed of Balliet Run has an area of 7.23 square miles (18.7 km^{2}). The mouth of the stream is in the United States Geological Survey quadrangle of Sybertsville. However, the source is in the quadrangle of Freeland.

Balliet Run is on private land that is closed to access throughout its entire length. There are 10.73 miles (17.27 km) of streams in its watershed. There is a patch of wetland at the stream's headwaters.

== History ==
Balliet Run was entered into the Geographic Names Information System on August 2, 1979. Its identifier in the Geographic Names Information System is 1168669.

In the 1980s, a skeet shooting club known as Ashley Skeet Club from the borough of Ashley owned a tract of land on Blue Ridge Trail at Balliet Run.

Balliet Run was stocked with fish in 1957. However, it was designated as Class A Wild Trout Waters in 2007. In 2013, a 100-acre tract of land on the stream underwent conservation for the area's bat and trout populations.

In the court case Pennsy Supple, Inc. v. Zoning Hearing Board of Dorrance County, it was alleged that sediment from a nearby quarry was adversely affecting Balliet Run. However, Patrick Bartorillo, president of the Small Mountain Quarry stated that "There will be no impact on wetlands, no impact on Balliet Run and we would enclose all the crushing equipment."

== Biology ==
Balliet Run is inhabited by brown trout. The biomass of that species of trout in the stream is 59.73 kilograms per hectare, considerably higher than the minimum of 30 kilograms per hectare that is required for a stream to be designated as Class A Wild Trout Waters. Native brook trout also inhabit the stream.

Balliet Run is considered by the Pennsylvania Fish and Boat Commission to be Class A Wild Trout waters for brown trout from its headwaters to its confluence with Big Wapwallopen Creek. Balliet Run's designated uses are Coldwater Fishery and Migratory Fishery. However, its existing uses are High-Quality Coldwater Fishery and Migratory Fishery.

== See also ==
- Watering Run, next tributary of Big Wapwallopen Creek going upstream
- List of rivers of Pennsylvania
