= Watering Run =

River in Luzerne County, Pennsylvania, US

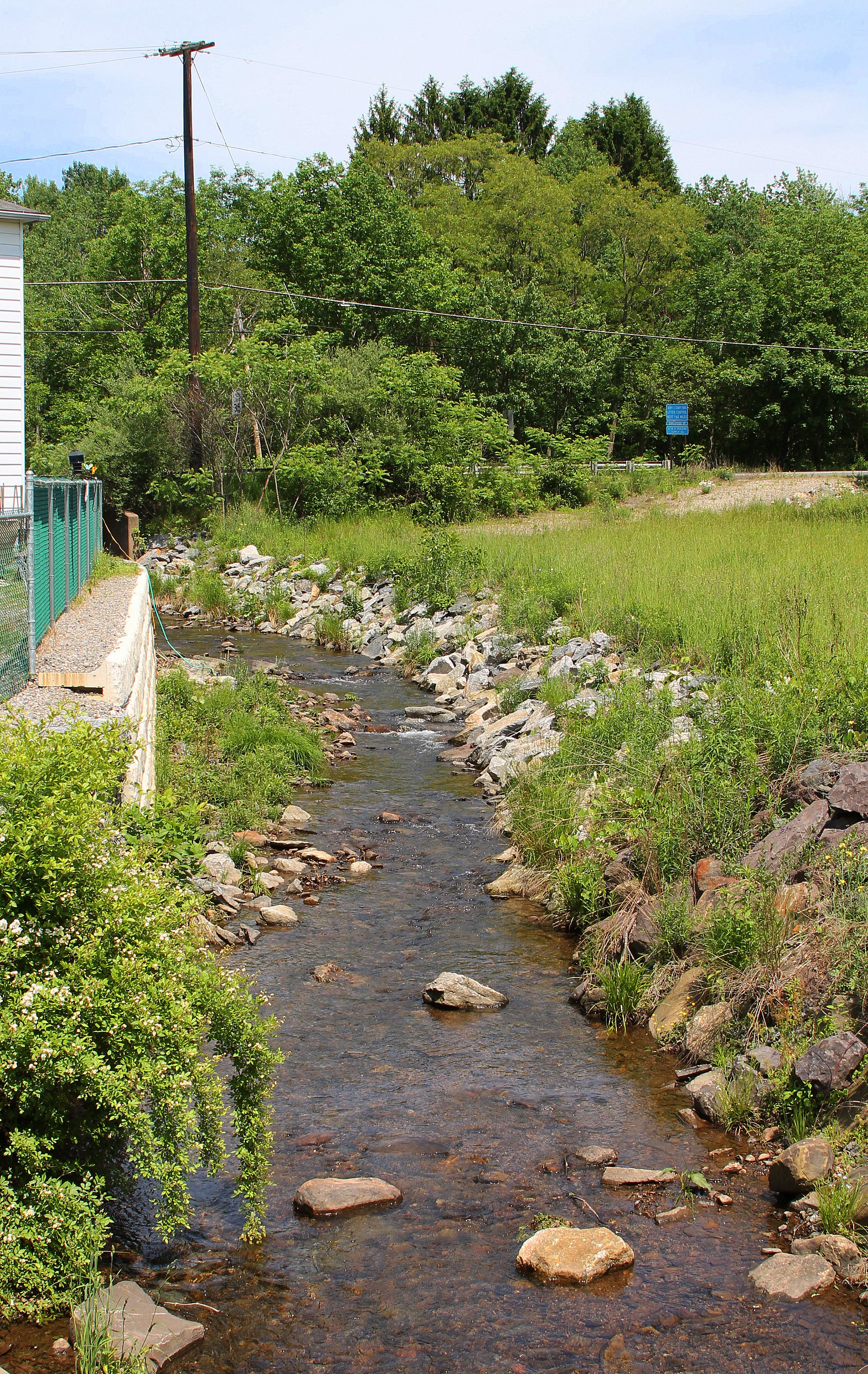
- Watering Run looking upstream in its middle reaches

Physical characteristics
- Source
  - location: just northwest of the community of Rita in Wright Township, Pennsylvania
  - elevation: between 1,520 and 1,540 feet (460 and 470 m)
- Mouth
  - location: Big Wapwallopen Creek on the border between Wright Township, Pennsylvania and Rice Township, Luzerne County, Pennsylvania
  - coordinates: 41°06′56″N 75°57′27″W
  - elevation: 1,076 ft (328 m)
- Length: 4.2 mi (6.8 km)
- Discharge
  - average: 480 cu ft/s (14 m^{3}/s) peak annual discharge at mouth (10% probability)

Basin features
- Progression: Big Wapwallopen Creek → Susquehanna River → Chesapeake Bay
- Tributaries
  - right: two unnamed tributaries

Watering Run is a tributary of Big Wapwallopen Creek in Luzerne County, Pennsylvania, in the United States. It is approximately 4.2 miles (6.8 km) long and flows through Wright Township. The watershed of the stream has an area of 3.87 square miles (10.0 km^{2}). Soils in the vicinity of the stream include Morris Silt Loam, Braceville and Chenango Gravelly Loams, Oquaga and Lordstown Silt Loams, and Rexford Loam. The stream is designated as a Coldwater Fishery. It flooded in 1972.

== Course ==
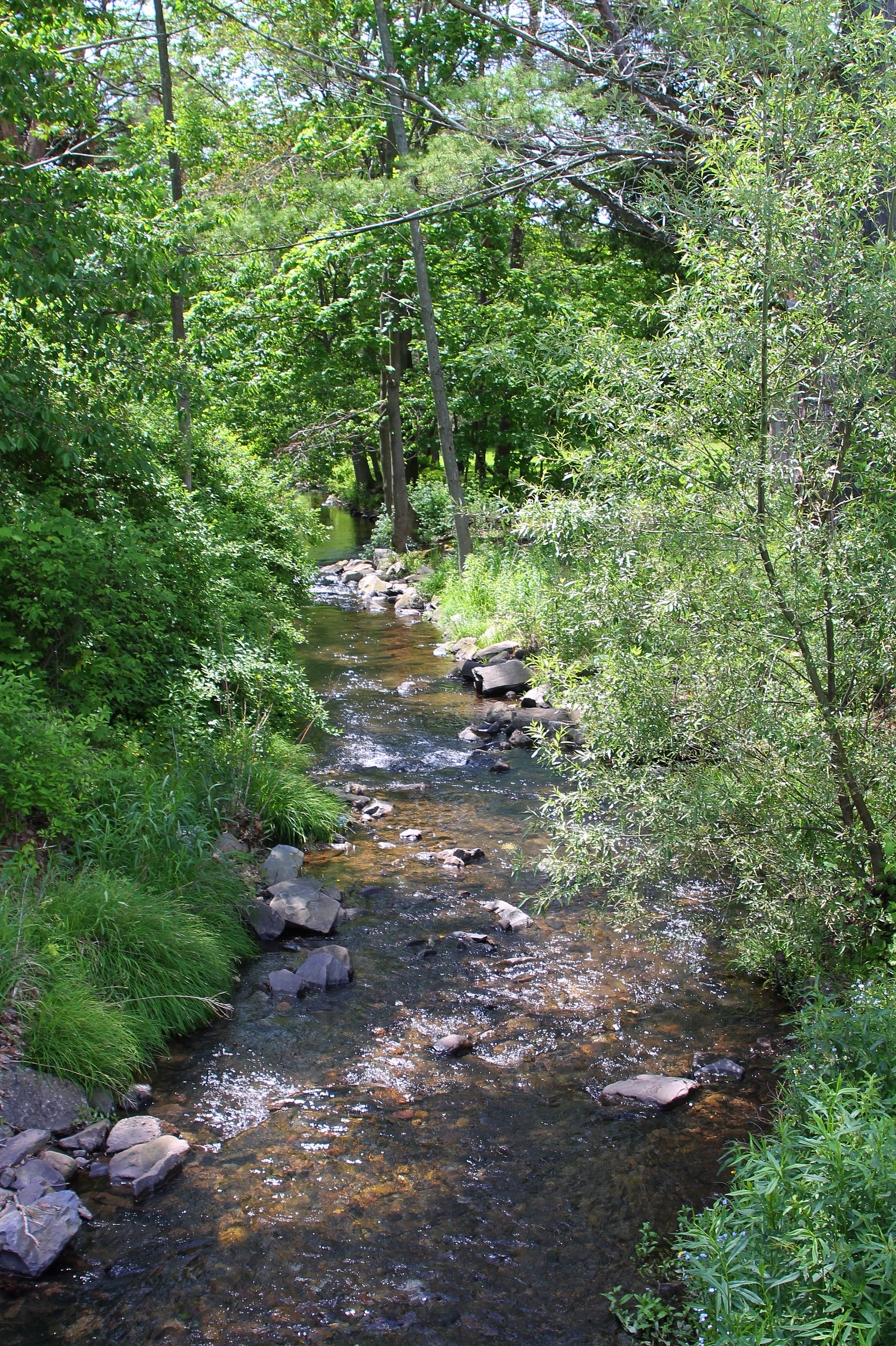
Watering Run looking downstream in its middle reaches at Albert

Watering Run begins in Wright Township, just northwest of the community of Rita. It flows west-southwest for a few tenths of a mile before turning west-northwest for several tenths of a mile. The stream then turns west-southwest for a few miles, crossing receiving an unnamed tributary from the right, crossing Pennsylvania Route 309, and receiving another unnamed tributary from the right. It eventually passes by Little Nescopeck Mountain and passes through the community of Albert. The stream then turns west for nearly a mile before reaching its confluence with Big Wapwallopen Creek on the border between Wright Township and Rice Township.

Watering Run joins Big Wapwallopen Creek 8.46 miles (13.62 km) upstream of its mouth.

== Hydrology ==
At its mouth, Watering Run has a 10 percent chance of reaching a peak annual discharge of 480 cubic feet per second. It has a 2 percent chance of reaching 820 cubic feet per second and a 1 percent chance of reaching 990 cubic feet per second. The stream has a 0.2 percent chance of reaching 1,450 cubic feet per second.

At a location 2,800 feet (850 m) downstream of Pennsylvania Route 309, Watering Run's peak annual discharge has a 10 percent chance of reaching 320 cubic feet per second. It has a 2 percent chance of reaching 540 cubic feet per second and a 1 percent chance of reaching 660 cubic feet per second. The peak annual discharge has a 0.2 percent chance of reaching 970 cubic feet per second.

At a location 1,300 feet (400 m) upstream of Pennsylvania Route 309, Watering Run's peak annual discharge has a 10 percent chance of reaching 210 cubic feet per second. It has a 2 percent chance of reaching 355 cubic feet per second and a 1 percent chance of reaching 430 cubic feet per second. The peak annual discharge has a 0.2 percent chance of reaching 635 cubic feet per second.

A sample of water taken from Watering Run in 2003 was found to lack volatile organic compounds. However, more than twenty such compounds have been observed in surface water in the watershed.

== Geography and geology ==
The elevation near the mouth of Watering Run is 1,076 feet (328 m) above sea level. The elevation of the stream's source is between 1,520 and 1,540 feet (460 and 470 m) above sea level.

Watering Run is surrounded by ridges. There are a number of surface drainage features in the vicinity of the stream.

The Morris Silt Loam is the main soil that occurs along Watering Run. This soil is poorly drained and occurs in glacial till derived from shale, sandstone, and siltstone. The Oquaga and Lordstown Silt Loams also occur in the stream's valley and Braceville and Chenango Gravelly Loams occur to the south of the stream. These soils are formed from glacial till and glacial outwash, respectively. Rexford Loam, which is formed from glacial outwash derived from sandstone and shale, also occurs to the south of the steam.

== Watershed ==
The watershed of Watering Run has an area of 3.87 square miles (10.0 km^{2}). Both the source and the mouth of the stream are in the United States Geological Survey quadrangle of Freeland. However, it passes through the quadrangle of Wilkes-Barre West.

The Certainteed Corporation has a permit to discharge stormwater into Watering Run. Eight industrial properties are located within 0.25 miles (0.40 km) of the stream.

== History ==
Watering Run was entered into the Geographic Names Information System on August 2, 1979. Its identifier in the Geographic Names Information System is 1190677.

Plans were made to construct a bridge over Watering Run in the early 1900s for $200.

Watering Run flooded in June 1972. The floodwaters of the stream covered Alberdeen Road in 12 inches (30 cm) of water at the village of Albert. This is the only time that a major storm has caused flooding in any developed portion of Wright Township.

== Biology ==
Watering Run is considered to be a Coldwater Fishery. Wild trout naturally reproduce in the stream.

== See also ==
- Balliet Run, next tributary of Big Wapwallopen Creek going upstream
- Bow Creek (Big Wapwallopen Creek), next tributary of Big Wapwallopen Creek going upstream
- List of rivers of Pennsylvania
