= Fairview Township, Luzerne County, Pennsylvania =

Township in Pennsylvania, US

Coordinates: 41°10′00″N 75°51′59″W

- Township
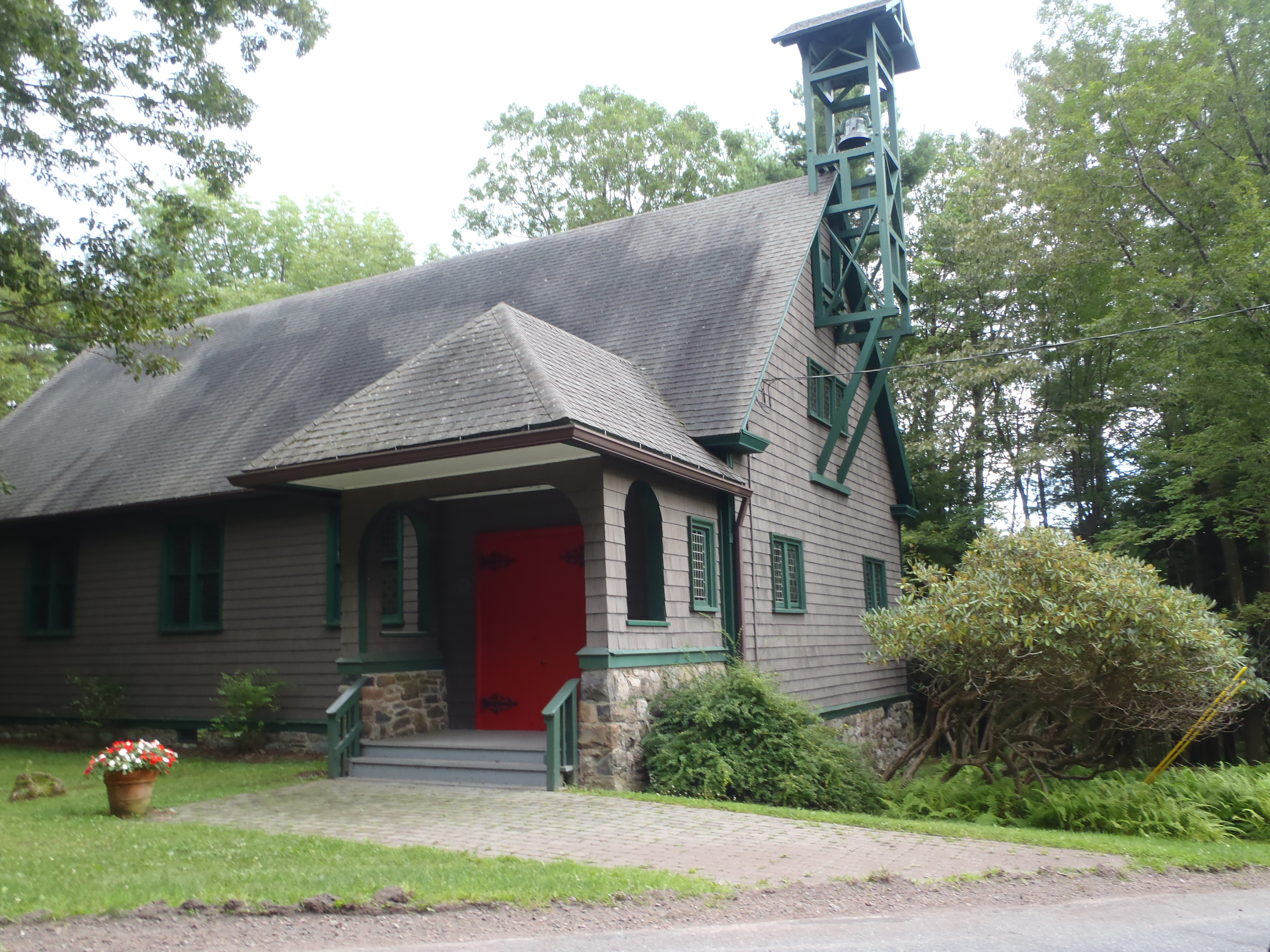
- Glen Summit Chapel in August 2011

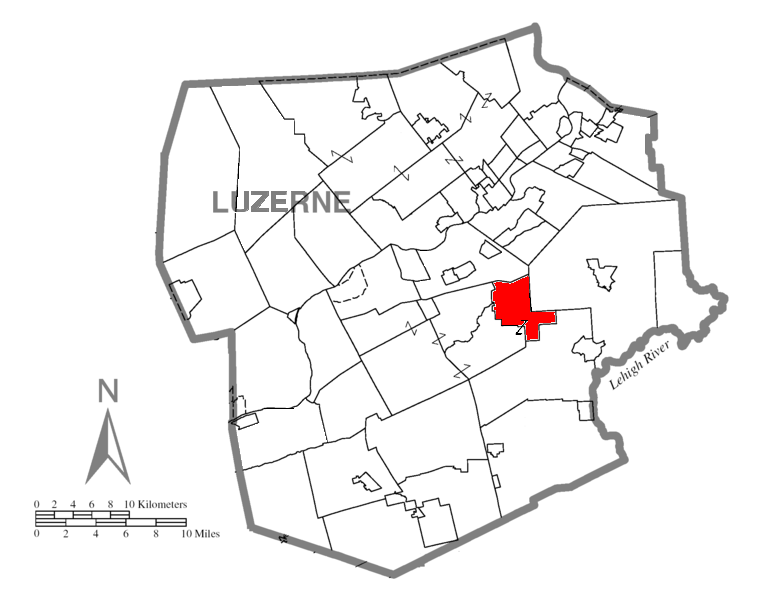
- Location of Fairview Township in Luzerne County, Pennsylvania

- Location of Luzere County in Pennsylvania
- Country: United States
- State: Pennsylvania
- County: Luzerne

Area
  - Total: 9.44 sq mi (24.46 km^{2})
  - Land: 9.44 sq mi (24.44 km^{2})
  - Water: 0.0077 sq mi (0.02 km^{2})

Population (2020)
  - Total: 4,691 ▲
  - Estimate (2021): 4,692
  - Density: 475.4/sq mi (183.55/km^{2})
- Time zone: UTC-5 (Eastern (EST))
  - Summer (DST): UTC-4 (EDT)
- ZIP Code: 18707
- Area codes: 570 & 272
- FIPS code: 42-079-24888
- Website: fairviewluzerne.com

Fairview Township is a township in Luzerne County, Pennsylvania, United States. The population was 4,691 at the 2020 census.

== History ==
=== Founding ===
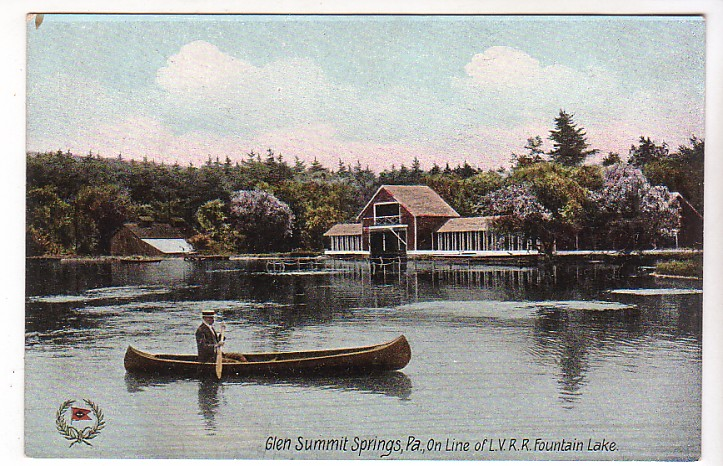
Fountain Lake in Fairview Township

In the late 18th century, Conrad Wickeiser was the first settler in modern-day Fairview Township. He was followed by James Wright, who built the first tavern and the first sawmill in 1820. Additional sawmills were constructed throughout the area. Logging was one of the chief industries in the area.

In September 1888, the court appointed several commissioners to examine and report whether or not dividing Wright Township would be feasible. The men reported in favor of division. The court approved the report; a referendum on the question of division was held in 1889. On May 6, the court—in accordance with the affirmative vote—ordered for the division of Wright Township; the new territory was named Fairview Township.

=== Glen Summit Village ===
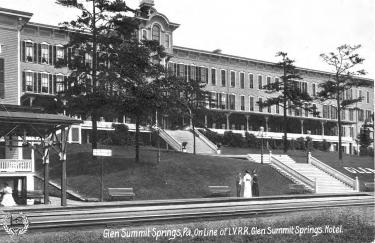
A postcard for the Glen Summit Hotel in Fairview Township

One of the first settlers of Glen Summit Springs in Fairview Township was John Conety. In the early 20th century, Conety owned approximately 25 acres (10 ha) that included present-day Indian Springs and Glen Summit Springs. Conety had a log cabin on the property and kept a roadhouse for passing travelers from the Wyoming Valley to New York City or Philadelphia.

After his death, the land passed to his son, Richard Conety, Senior. Conety sold the land and a house he had built on the property (in 1880) to H. H. Derr of Wilkes-Barre. Derr purchased the property for fish and game. A few years later, Derr sold the property to the Lehigh Valley Railroad.

In 1882, the Lehigh Valley Railroad (along with J.E. Patterson) organized the Glen Summit Hotel and Land Company. They purchased some adjoining land to their original purchase from Derr. The land was covered in scrub oak at the time, which allowed fantastic views of the valley that stretched before the westward face of Nescopeck Mountain. Over time this view was blocked by tree growth, but the addition of trees helped to increase the beauty of the neighborhood.

=== Ashley Planes ===
Ashley Planes (located in Fairview Township) was listed on the National Register of Historic Places in 1980.

== Geography ==
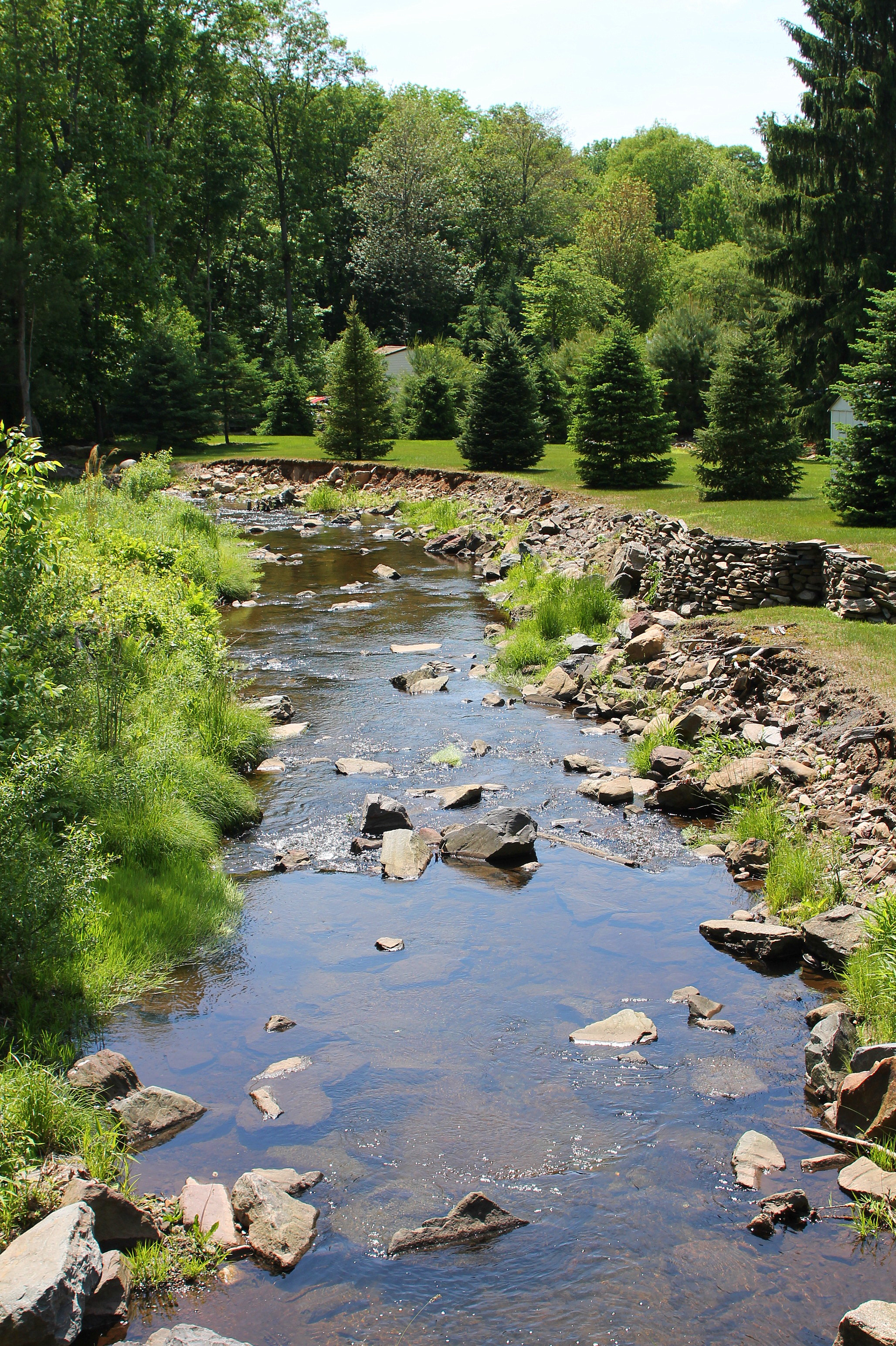
Bow Creek flows through Fairview Township

According to the United States Census Bureau, the township has a total area of 9.4 square miles (24.4 km^{2}), of which 9.4 square miles (24.4 km^{2}) is land and 0.09% is water. Fairview Township is part of the Mountain Top region of Luzerne County. Most of the township's homes and businesses are located in the western half of the community. Glen Summit is a village in the township. The eastern part of the community consists mostly of thick forests. The two major roadways in the township are PA 309 and PA 437, both run north to south through the community.

Fairview has a warm-summer humid continental climate (Dfb) and average monthly temperatures in the vicinity of the junction of 309 and 437 ranges from 24.3 °F in January to 70.1 °F in July. PRISM Climate Group, Oregon State U

== Demographics ==
Historical population
Census	Pop.	Note	%±
2000	3,995		—
2010	4,520		13.1%
2020	4,691		3.8%
2021 (est.)	4,692		0.0%
U.S. Decennial Census

As of the census of 2000, there were 3,995 people, 1,450 households, and 1,161 families residing in the township. The population density was 410.2 inhabitants per square mile (158.4/km^{2}). There were 1,502 housing units at an average density of 154.2 per square mile (59.5/km^{2}). The racial makeup of the township was 96.17% White, 0.83% African American, 0.05% Native American, 2.10% Asian, 0.20% from other races, and 0.65% from two or more races. Hispanic or Latino of any race were 1.05% of the population.

There were 1,450 households, out of which 40.4% had children under the age of 18 living with them, 68.2% were married couples living together, 9.0% had a female householder with no husband present, and 19.9% were non-families. 17.9% of all households were made up of individuals, and 7.9% had someone living alone who was 65 years of age or older. The average household size was 2.76 and the average family size was 3.13.

In the township, the population was spread out, with 28.8% under the age of 18, 5.6% from 18 to 24, 28.9% from 25 to 44, 23.7% from 45 to 64, and 13.0% who were 65 years of age or older. The median age was 38 years. For every 100 females, there were 92.8 males. For every 100 females age 18 and over, there were 90.7 males.

The median income for a household in the township was $55,500, and the median income for a family was $62,500. Males had a median income of $47,400 versus $26,614 for females. The per capita income for the township was $23,333. About 3.4% of families and 3.1% of the population were below the poverty line, including 4.1% of those under age 18 and 1.5% of those age 65 or over.
