= Hollenback Township, Pennsylvania =

Township in Pennsylvania, US

Coordinates: 41°03′00″N 76°04′59″W

- Township
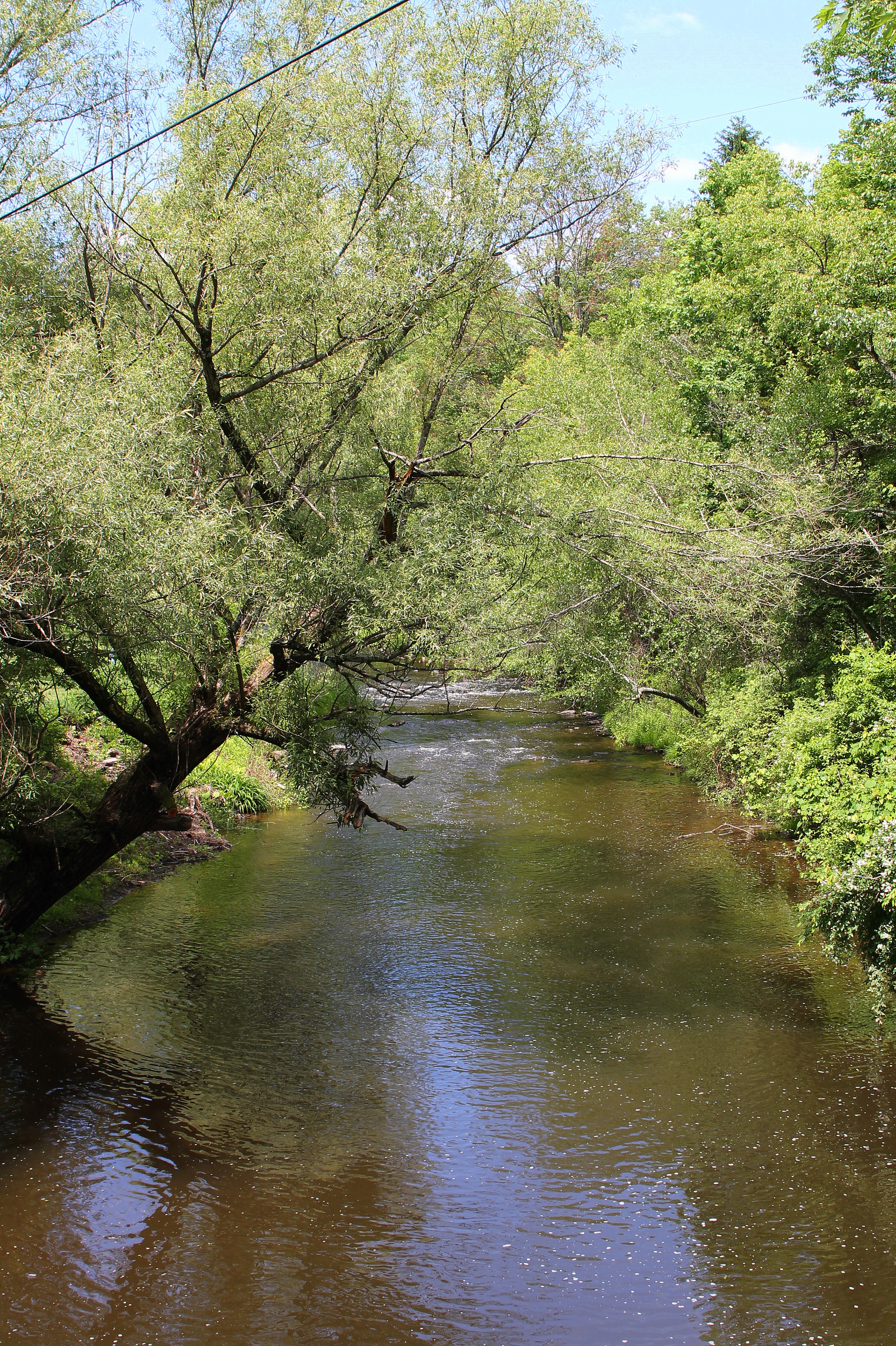
- Big Wapwallopen Creek in Hollenback Township (June 2015)

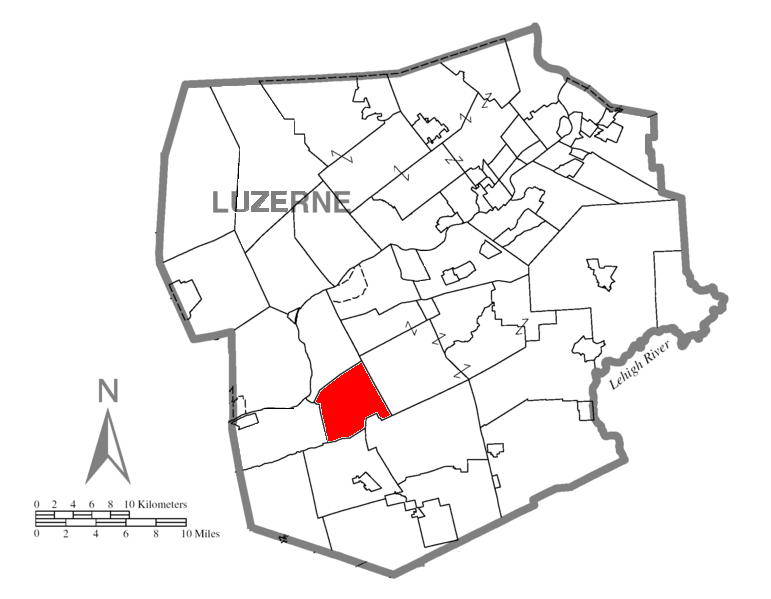
- Map of Luzerne County highlighting Hollenback Township

- Map of Pennsylvania highlighting Luzerne County
- Country: United States
- State: Pennsylvania
- County: Luzerne

Area
  - Total: 15.16 sq mi (39.26 km^{2})
  - Land: 15.16 sq mi (39.26 km^{2})
  - Water: 0 sq mi (0.00 km^{2})

Population (2020)
  - Total: 1,125 ▼
  - Estimate (2021): 1,132
  - Density: 78.6/sq mi (30.34/km^{2})
- Time zone: UTC-5 (Eastern (EST))
  - Summer (DST): UTC-4 (EDT)
- ZIP code: 18660
- Area code: 570
- FIPS code: 42-079-35192

Hollenback Township is a township which is located in Luzerne County, Pennsylvania, United States. The population was 1,125 at the time of the 2020 census.

== History ==
When several German farmers entered modern-day Hollenback Township in 1789, they faced the difficult task of converting the rugged landscape and stubborn soil into fertile farmland. By 1796, the area belonged to Nescopeck and Newport Townships. In 1825, the first store and tavern were erected.

The logging industry subsequently took off in Hollenback; in 1866, the area contained six sawmills and several gristmills. By 1870, the township had a population of 1,300. It was later reduced to seven hundred and thirty when a section of the township broke away to form Conyngham Township.

== Geography ==
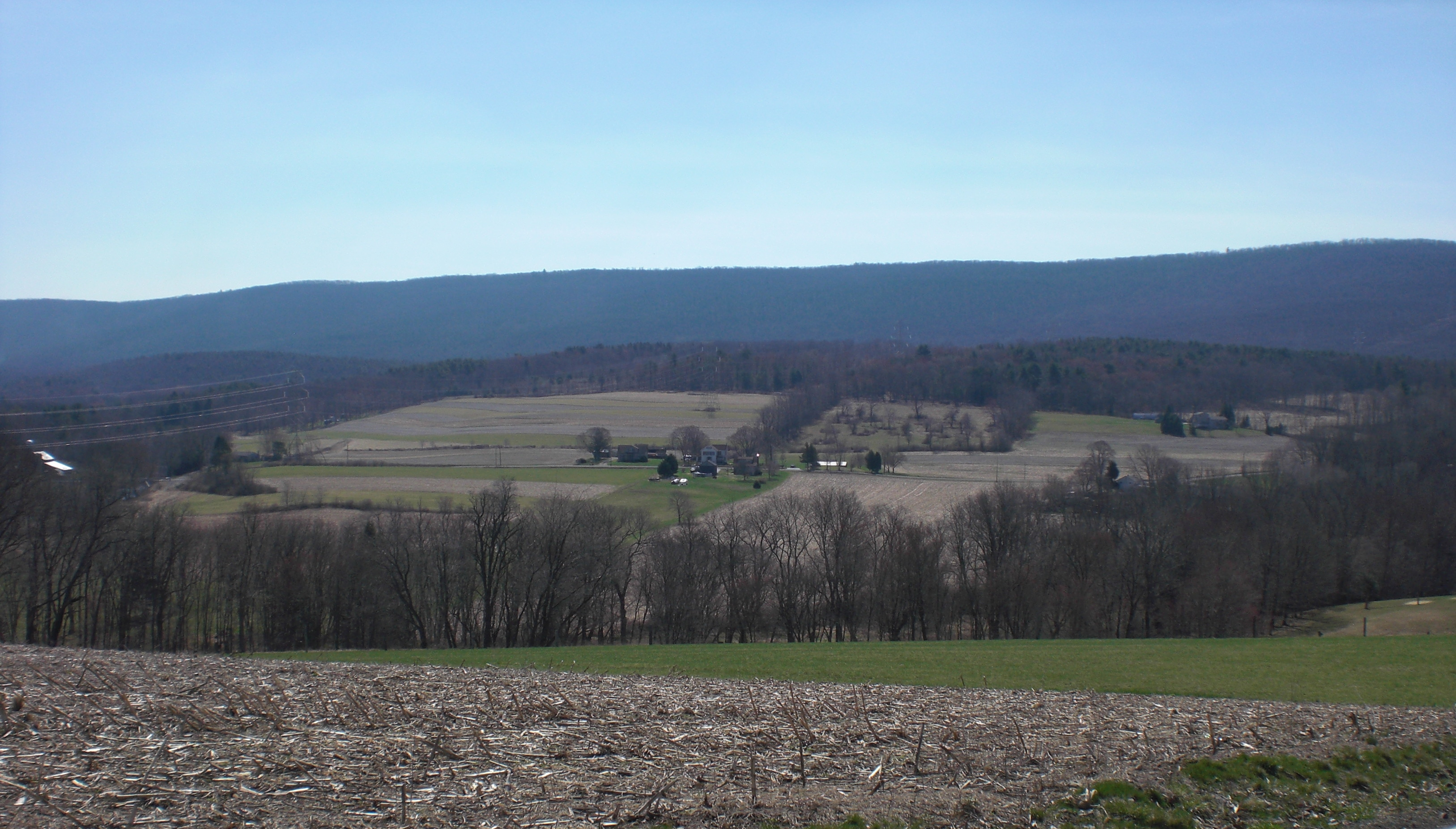
Scenery of the township (mid-April 2014)

According to the United States Census Bureau, the township has a total area of 15.2 square miles (39.3 km^{2}), all of it land. PA 93 travels through the southern portion of the township, and links up with I-80, just south of the municipality. I-81 is east of the township.

Hollenback lies within a fertile valley between Hess Mountain (to the north) and Nescopeck Mountain (to the south). The center of the community is made up of small farming communities (e.g., the Hobbie Village). The northern and southern sections are made up of dense forests. Several creeks flow through the township (e.g., Big Wapwallopen Creek and Little Wapwallopen Creek).

=== Education ===
Hollenback Township is part of Berwick Area School District.

== Demographics ==
Historical population
Census	Pop.	Note	%±
2000	1,243		—
2010	1,196		−3.8%
2020	1,125		−5.9%
2021 (est.)	1,132		0.6%
U.S. Decennial Census

As of the census of 2000, there were 1,243 people, 439 households, and 355 families residing in the township.

The population density was 79.8 inhabitants per square mile (30.8/km^{2}). There were 466 housing units at an average density of 29.9 per square mile (11.5/km^{2}).

The racial makeup of the township was 98.39% White, 0.32% African American, 0.08% Native American, 0.16% Asian, and 1.05% from two or more races. Hispanic or Latino of any race were 0.40% of the population.

There were 439 households, out of which 37.1% had children under the age of eighteen living with them; 68.6% were married couples living together, 6.2% had a female householder with no husband present, and 19.1% were non-families. 15.9% of all households were made up of individuals, and 7.1% had someone living alone who was sixty-five years of age or older.

The average household size was 2.80 and the average family size was 3.10.

In the township the population was spread out, with 26.3% under the age of eighteen, 6.5% from eighteen to twenty-four, 30.1% from twenty-five to forty-four, 23.1% from forty-five to sixty-four, and 14.0% who were sixty-five years of age or older. The median age was thirty-eight years.

For every one hundred females, there were 99.8 males. For every one hundred females who were aged eighteen or older, there were 97.4 males.

The median income for a household in the township was $42,063, and the median income for a family was $44,712. Males had a median income of $33,125 compared with that of $21,058 for females.

The per capita income for the township was $16,794.

Roughly 5.9% of families and 7.3% of the population were living below the poverty line, including 13.2% of those who were under the age of eighteen and 10.1% of those who were aged sixty-five or older.
