= Glen Summit Springs, Pennsylvania =

Unincorporated community in Pennsylvania, US

Glen Summit Springs
- Historic residential neighborhood
- Location within the state of Pennsylvania Glen Summit Springs (the United States)
- Coordinates: 41°8′35″N 75°51′52″W
- Country: United States
- State: Pennsylvania
- County: Luzerne
- Township: Fairview
- Founded: 1883
- Time zone: UTC-5 (Eastern (EST))
  - Summer (DST): UTC-4 (EDT)

Glen Summit Springs is a private community located in Northeastern Pennsylvania, United States, on the northern slope of the eastern end of Nescopeck Mountain, where it sweeps to the north to meet the southward bend of Penobscot Knob. The area has long been known regionally for its mountain springs and is now protected by over 450 acres (180 ha) of pristine, uncultivated forest made up of privately owned and conservation lands. The area was once the summer residence of many of the Wyoming Valley elite including the Kirbys, Welles, Hollenbacks, and Sterlings.

The community is located in Fairview Township, Luzerne County, Pennsylvania, east of the census-designated place of Mountain Top.

== Early settlers ==
One of the first settlers of Glen Summit Springs was John Conety. In the end of the 19th and the beginning of the 20th century, Conety owned approximately 25 acres (10 ha) that included present-day Indian Springs and Glen Summit Springs. Conety had a log cabin on the property and kept a roadhouse for passing travelers from the Wyoming Valley to New York City or Philadelphia.

After his death the land passed to his son, Richard Conety, Sr. Conety sold the land and a house he had built on the property in 1880 to Mr. H. H. Derr of Wilkes-Barre. Derr purchased the property for fish and game. A few years later Derr sold the property to the Lehigh Valley Railroad Company.

In 1882, the Lehigh Valley Railroad along with J.E. Patterson organized the Glen Summit Hotel and Land Company and bought some more adjoining land to their original purchase from Derr. Here they began work on a hotel. The land was covered in scrub oak at the time, which allowed fantastic views of the valley that stretched before the westward face of Nescopeck Mountain. Over time this view was blocked by tree growth, but the addition of trees helped to increase the beauty of the neighborhood.

== Founding and original Victorian cottages ==
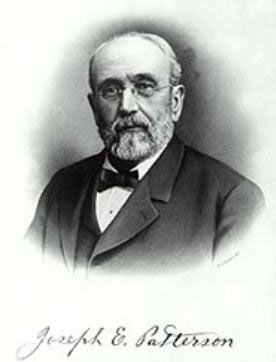
Joseph E. Patterson, founder of Glen Summit and Glen Summit Springs Water Company

The founder of Glen Summit Hotel and Land Company and later the Glen Summit Springs Company was J.E. Patterson. Patterson was a successful Wilkes-Barre businessman who sought to purchase property in the area now known as Glen Summit to enjoy the mountain air and resolve his bothersome insomnia. He purchased approximately 500 acres (200 ha) on which he built his home, knowing the grounds contained excellent springs. Mr. Patterson undertook discussions with the Lehigh Valley Railroad and proposed that a grand hotel should be built to provide rail travelers a distinguished place to rest and refresh. Mr. Patterson's idea was embraced and in 1882 construction was begun on a magnificent hotel with Mr. Patterson acting as the general contractor.

In the transfer of land from Mr. Patterson to the Lehigh Valley Railroad, Patterson retained 200 acres (81 ha) that held the finest springs and began bottling pure spring water in 1884. This would later become the Glen Summit Springs Company. The Glen Summit Hotel and the Victorian cottages that were subsequently built in the Glen Summit Village, were, in their heyday, a gathering place for the social elite from as far as New York and Philadelphia. From 1880 to 1915, a total of forty-three Victorian-style and Cottage-style houses were built by vacationers to the Glen Summit Hotel, starting with J.E. Patterson and ending with F.M. Kirby. Some of these homes were even given names, though some of them have been lost to time. Some of these names were "Stony Croft", "Breezy Top" and "Graystone Terrace". Many of these first 43 homes remain to this day.

== Glen Summit Hotel ==
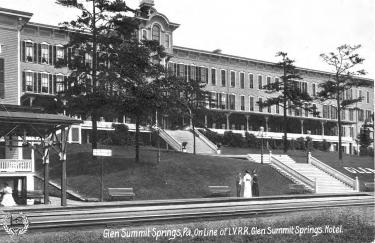
A postcard for the Glen Summit Hotel

Construction on the Glen Summit Hotel began in 1883. Opened February 21, 1884, the hotel was originally built as a clean place where passengers could enjoy their meals. A pamphlet published for the hotel describes it as the following.

"In this sanitarium of Nature's own building, where all the elements combine to produce sanitary conditions, it is the Glen Summit Springs hotel, the most famous mountain resort in the highlands of the Keystone State. Perched like an eagle's eyrie high upon the mountain's crest, the hotel is of the Alpine chateau style of architecture presenting a truly imposing appearance."

The hotel was three stories high and could accommodate up to 250 people. The hotel held a number of amenities throughout the neighborhood, many of which still survive today. What is referred to by current residents as the "Casino" was originally an addition to the hotel. This building included a bowling alley and billiards and shuffleboard rooms. Further into the neighborhood were tennis courts, as well as a nearby lake used for fishing and boating, both of which are still in use.

Shortly after the construction of the hotel the Pullman car was developed for rail travel, eliminating the need for the hotel as a place for meals. However, patronage continued due to the lovely setting and amenities that were offered. During the 1890s patrons would be delighted to see that the president of the Lehigh Valley Railroad or another official would consistently come up to enjoy a weekend at the hotel. Eventually patronage began to decline when the smaller engines used in the 1880s and 1890s gave way to larger and louder locomotives. During World War I the hotel was a successful meeting place for preparing Red Cross war supplies. It was also used as a meeting place for the people of Glen Summit and the surrounding neighborhood to hold teas, luncheons and dinners. In 1909 the owners of the nearby cottages formed a new company called the Glen Summit Company and purchased the hotel. In 1910 President Theodore Roosevelt visited the hotel. However, no one could stop the decline, and after a few years the building was torn down.

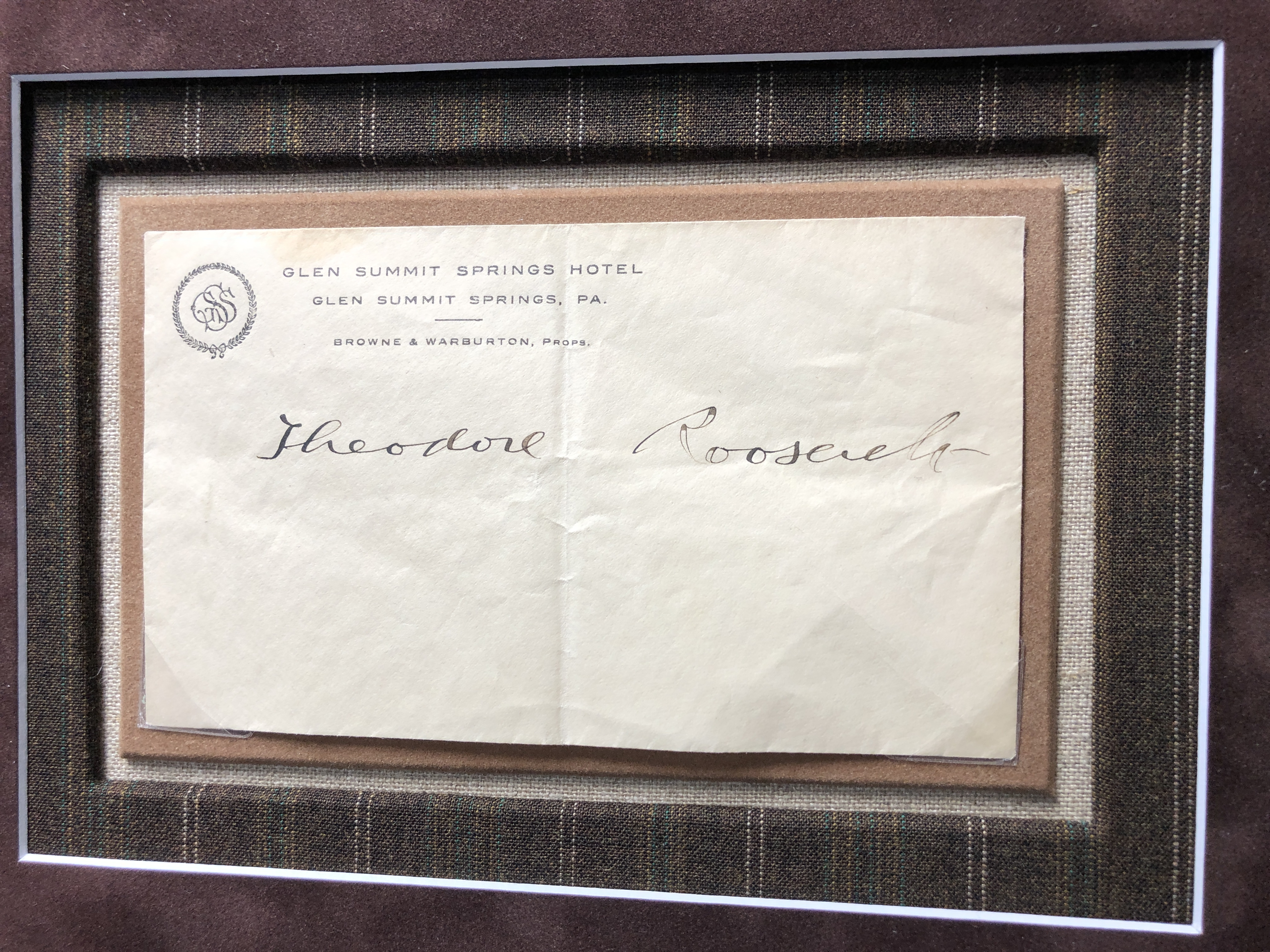

== Glen Summit Chapel ==
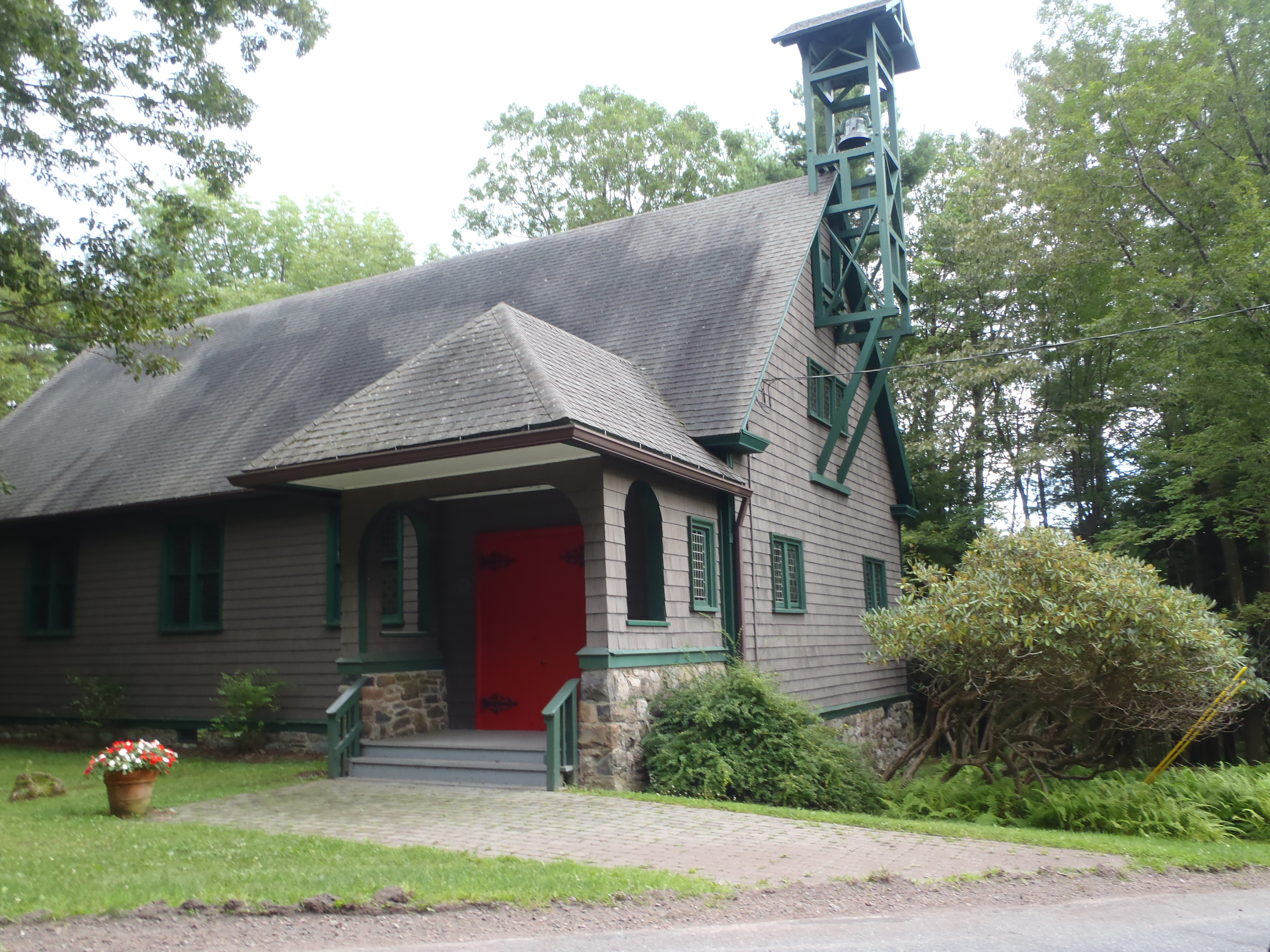
The Glen Summit Chapel as of August 2011

In 1888, the residents and frequent patrons of Glen Summit contributed the money for a chapel. A rustic building was erected, one that was suitable for the mountainous area. Parts such as the organ and chairs were donated by patrons. Originally there were twelve services held each summer, but in 1932 this number was reduced to nine and eventually one. The chapel is still used for a yearly service as well as weddings, for neighborhood residents and outsiders, with the neighboring casino serving as a reception hall.

== Fountain Lake ==
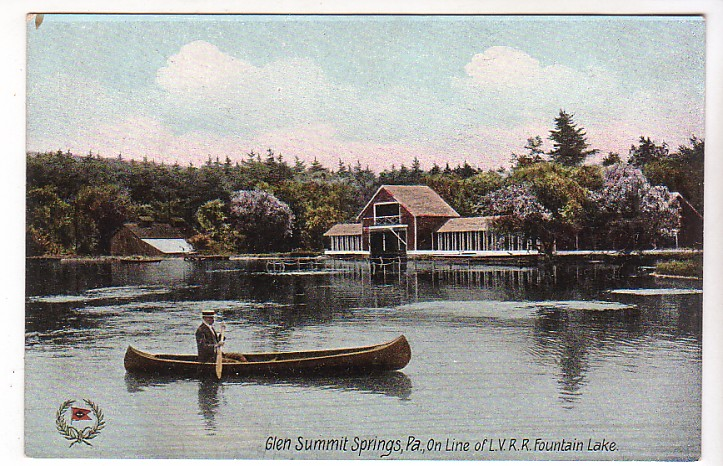
A postcard for Fountain Lake during the time of the Glen Summit Hotel

Glen Summit's features include:

- Fountain Lake, a freshwater summer destination for swimming, fishing and camping open only to residents of Glen Summit
- The Glen Summit Tennis Courts (open only to the residents of Glen Summit) one of the only red-clay surface tennis facilities remaining in the United States
- 100-200 of acres of trails for hiking, hunting, mountain biking and recreation open only to the residents of Glen Summit
- The Glen Summit casino, which hosts community events, parties and wedding receptions primarily during the summer months
- The Twin Springs, with two gazebos enclosing the natural spring water which bubbles up through the sand which resides on private land and is open only to residents of Glen Summit
