= Wright Township, Pennsylvania =

Township in Pennsylvania, US

Coordinates: 41°08′00″N 75°52′28″W

- Township
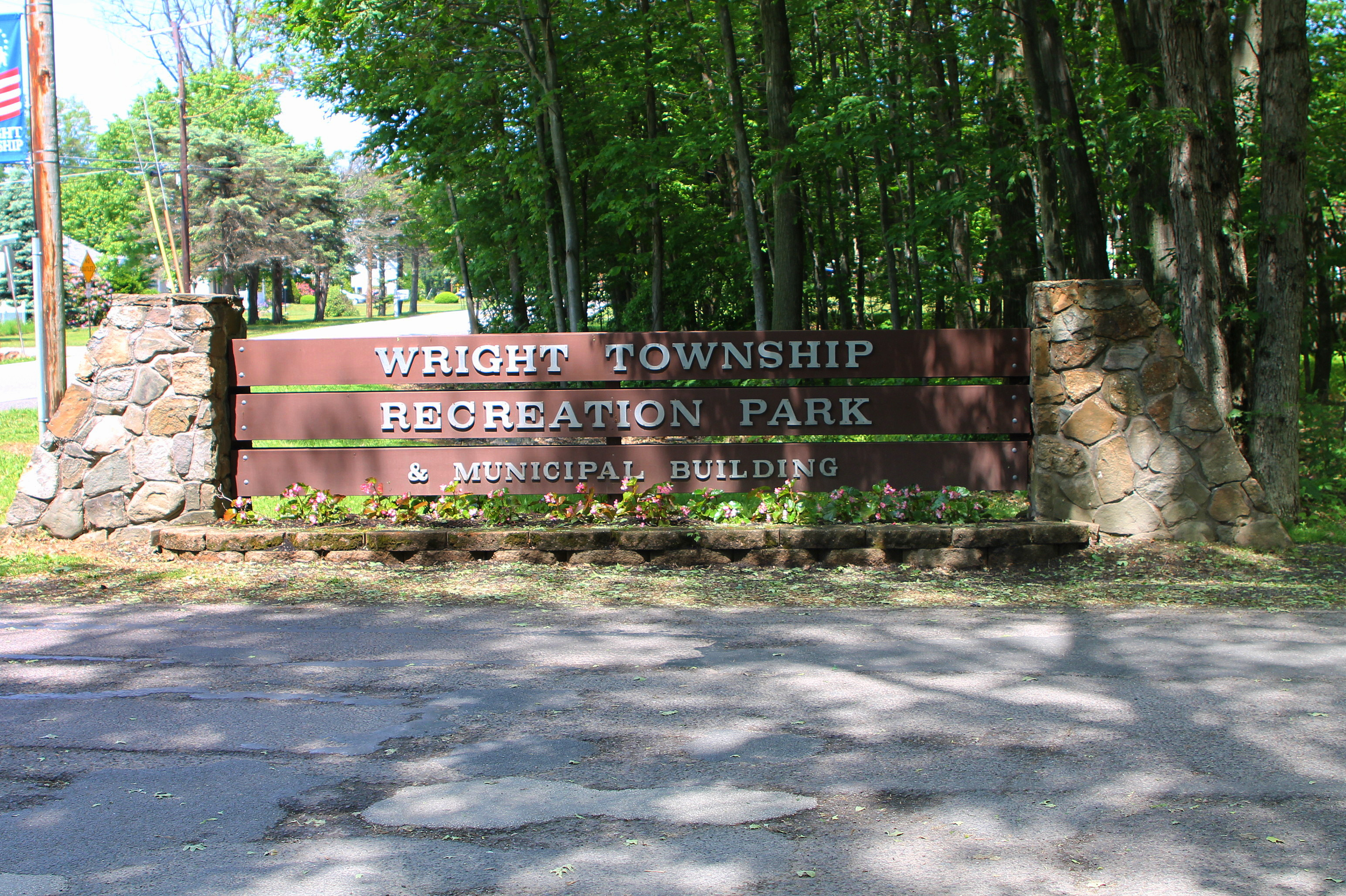
- Sign at the Wright Township Recreation Park

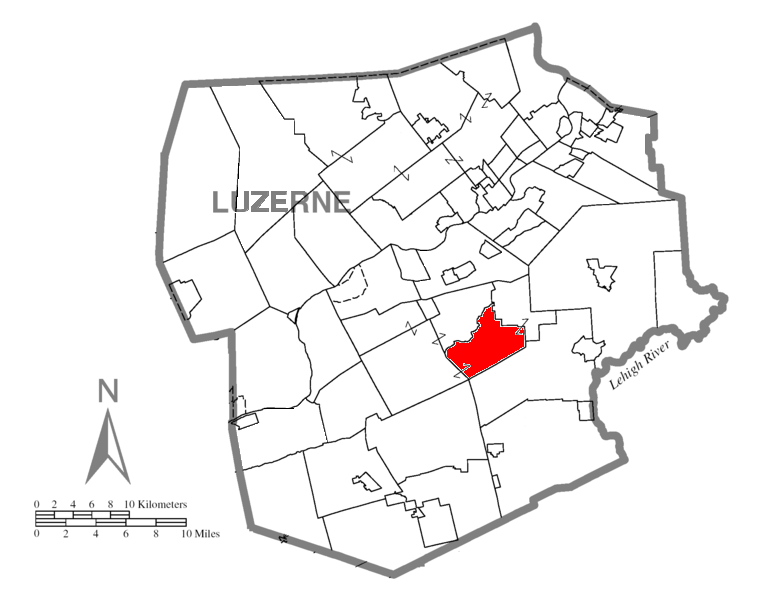
- Map of Luzerne County highlighting Wright Township

- Map of Pennsylvania highlighting Luzerne County
- Country: United States
- State: Pennsylvania
- County: Luzerne

Area
  - Total: 13.31 sq mi (34.48 km^{2})
  - Land: 13.31 sq mi (34.47 km^{2})
  - Water: 0.0039 sq mi (0.01 km^{2})

Population (2020)
  - Total: 5,726 ▲
  - Estimate (2021): 5,730
  - Density: 423.6/sq mi (163.55/km^{2})
- Time zone: UTC-5 (Eastern (EST))
  - Summer (DST): UTC-4 (EDT)
- ZIP code: 18707
- Area codes: 570 & 272
- FIPS code: 42-079-86584
- Website: https://wrighttownship.org/

Wright Township is a township in Luzerne County, Pennsylvania, United States. The population was 5,726 at the 2020 census.

== History ==
Wright Township was formed from a piece of Hanover Township in 1851. It was named in honor of Col. Hendrick B. Wright of Wilkes-Barre. In 1798, Conrad Wickeiser was the first settler in the region. He was followed by James Wright, who established the first tavern and sawmill in the locality. Logging was one of the chief industries in the region at the time. Wickeiser and Wright settled in what is now Fairview Township (once part of Wright Township). In what is now Wright Township, the first settler was probably Cornelius Garrison in the 1830s. He erected a sawmill on Big Wapwallopen Creek in the southwestern portion of the township. It was one of the longest running mills in the community.

== Geography ==
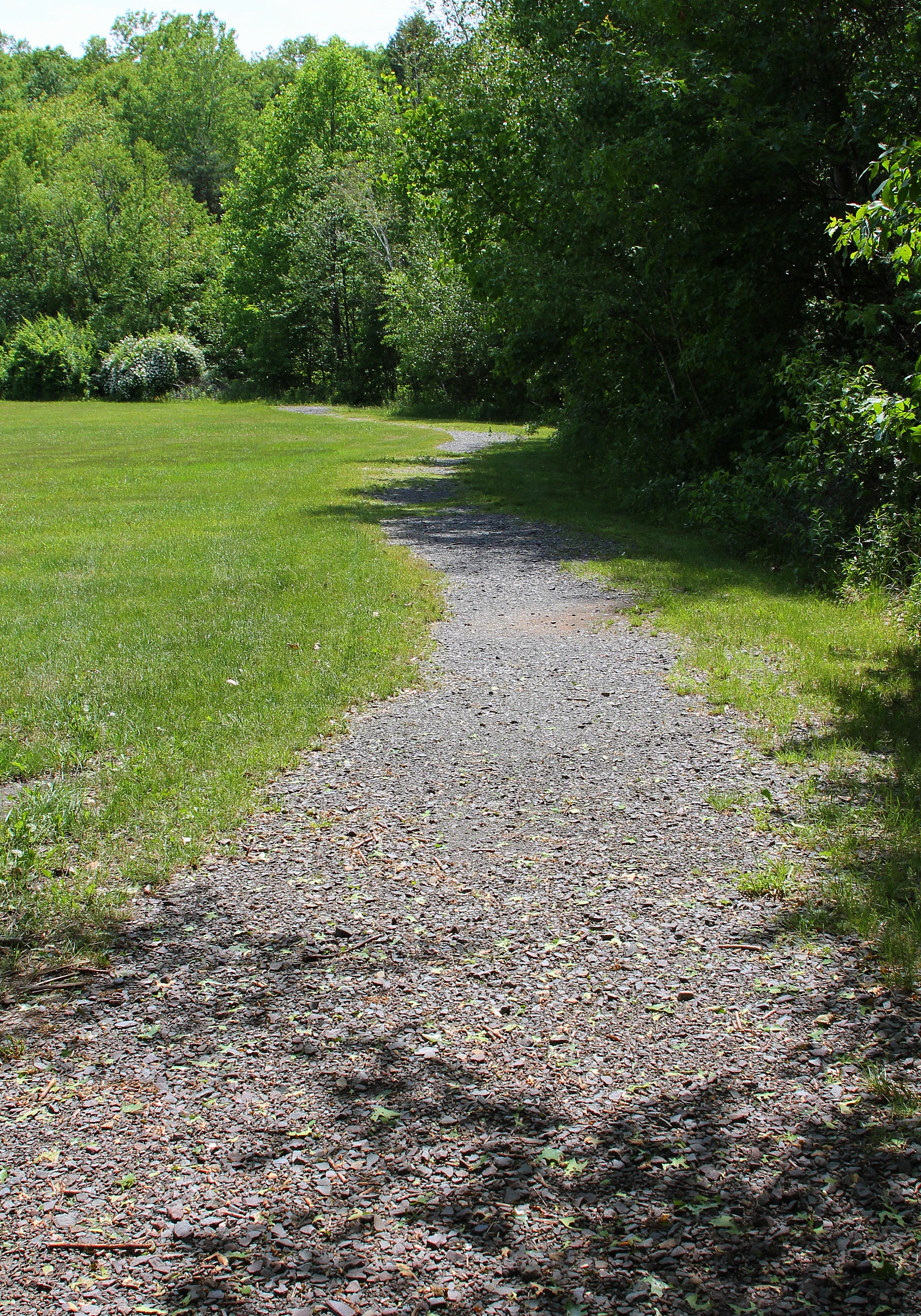
A walking path in the township's park

According to the United States Census Bureau, the township has a total area of 13.3 square miles (34.5 km^{2}), all land. Wright is part of the Mountain Top region of Luzerne County. The township is densely populated in the western half. The southern and eastern portions of Wright are made up of thick forests. The community's main business district is located in the northern and central portions of Wright. PA 309 runs north to south through the heart of the township. PA 437 travels through the eastern portion of Wright.

=== Recreation ===
Wright Township contains a very popular recreational park. It is located between PA 309 and South Main Road in the community. The park is in a wooded area and contains many nature trails. The park also includes four tennis courts, two blacktop basketball courts, a baseball field, and two soccer fields. The basketball courts and one of the tennis courts are illuminated during the active spring and summer months. It also has an ice hockey rink and a splash fountain for children. The park is very well kept and hosts camps for children during the summer.

=== Climate ===
Wright has a warm-township humid continental climate (Dfb) and average monthly temperatures in the vicinity of 309 and Church Road range from 24.3 °F in January to 69.8 °F in July.

== Law enforcement ==
Law enforcement is provided by the Wright Township Police; they are stationed in the municipal building. They currently employ several full-time officers and are part of the Mountain Top Regional Police.

== Demographics ==
Historical population
Census	Pop.	Note	%±
2000	5,593		—
2010	5,651		1.0%
2020	5,726		1.3%
2021 (est.)	5,730		0.1%
U.S. Decennial Census

At the time of the census of 2000, there were 5,593 people, 2,005 households, and 1,589 families residing in the township. The population density was 428.4 inhabitants per square mile (165.4/km^{2}). There were 2,071 housing units at an average density of 158.6 per square mile (61.2/km^{2}). The racial makeup of the township was 96.59% White, 0.55% African American, 0.04% Native American, 1.98% Asian, 0.27% from other races, and 0.57% from two or more races. Hispanic or Latino of any race were 1.18% of the population.

There were 2,005 households, out of which 35.0% had children under the age of 18 living with them, 69.3% were married couples living together, 7.4% had a female householder with no husband present, and 20.7% were non-families. 18.1% of all households were made up of individuals, and 9.7% had someone living alone who was 65 years of age or older. The average household size was 2.70 and the average family size was 3.09.

In the township the population was spread out, with 24.5% under the age of 18, 5.6% from 18 to 24, 27.1% from 25 to 44, 27.0% from 45 to 64, and 15.8% who were 65 years of age or older. The median age was 41 years. For every 100 females, there were 96.4 males. For every 100 females age 18 and over, there were 92.3 males.

The median income for a household in the township was $52,689, and the median income for a family was $60,585. Males had a median income of $45,570 versus $27,360 for females. The per capita income for the township was $23,787. About 3.4% of families and 3.8% of the population were below the poverty line, including 2.9% of those under age 18 and 9.5% of those age 65 or over.
