= Pennsylvania Route 437 =

State highway in Luzerne County, Pennsylvania, US

Pennsylvania Route 437

Route information
- Maintained by PennDOT
- Length: 11.223 mi (18.062 km)
- Existed: 1964–present

Major junctions
- South end: PA 940 in White Haven
- North end: PA 309 in Mountain Top

Location
- Country: United States
- State: Pennsylvania
- Counties: Luzerne

Highway system
- Pennsylvania State Route System; Interstate; US; State; Scenic; Legislative
← PA 436	→ PA 438

Pennsylvania Route 437 (PA 437) is an 11.2-mile-long (18.0 km) state highway located in Luzerne County in Pennsylvania. The southern terminus is at PA 940 in White Haven. The northern terminus is at PA 309 in the Fairview Township community of Mountain Top. PA 437 runs southeast-northwest through forested mountain areas as a two-lane undivided road. The roadway was paved by 1930 and designated PA 437 in the 1960s.

== Route description ==
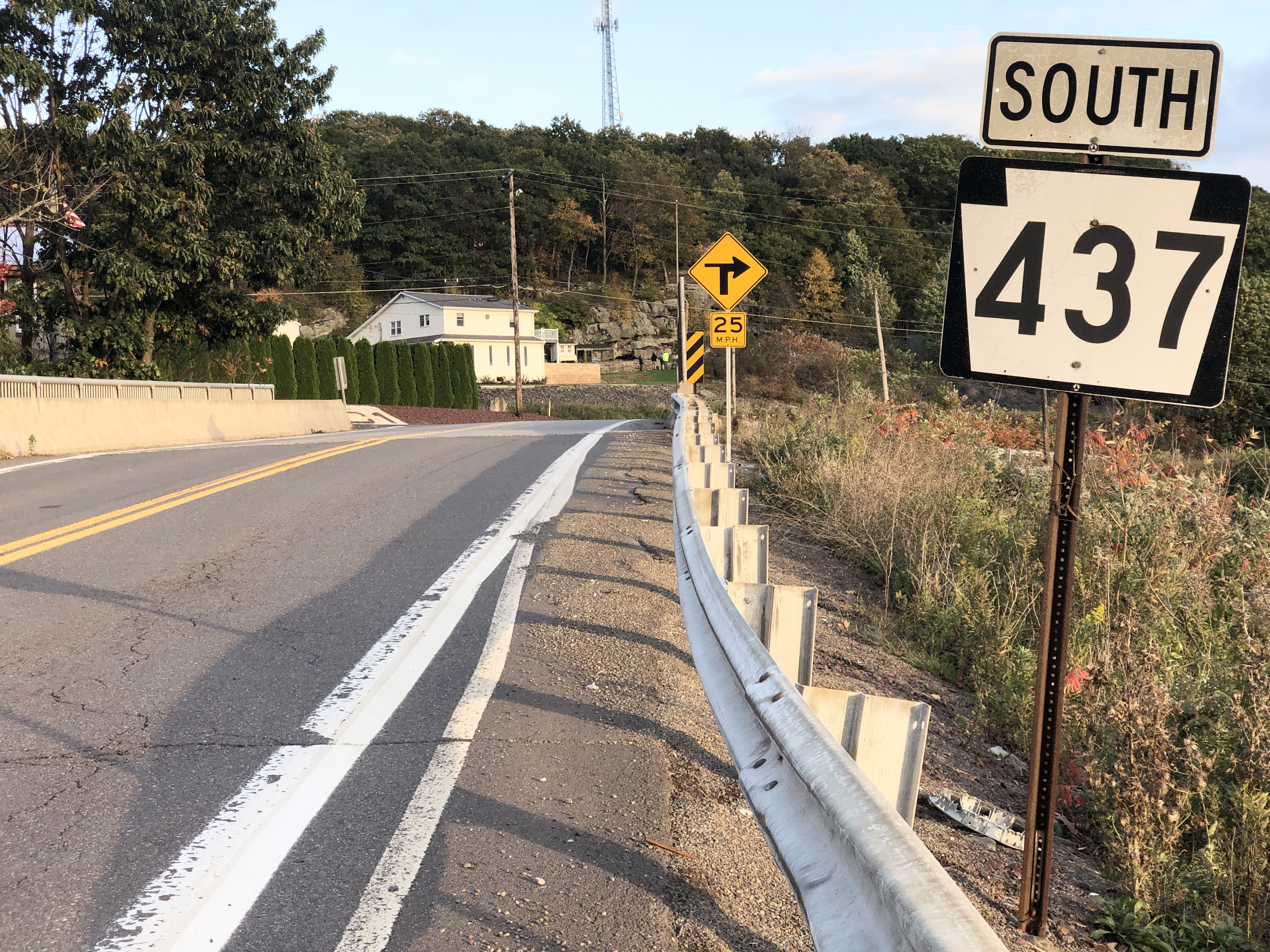
PA 437 southbound past PA 309 in Fairview Township

PA 437 begins at an intersection with PA 940 in the borough of White Haven, heading north on two-lane undivided Church Street. The route passes homes and some businesses before crossing into Dennison Township and becoming an unnamed road. At this point, the road runs through a mix of farmland and woodland. Farther northwest, PA 437 heads through forested mountain areas and passes under the Reading Blue Mountain and Northern Railroad's Lehigh Division line before entering Wright Township. Here, the road becomes Woodlawn Avenue and crosses through a tract of the Pinchot State Forest, making a turn to the north and running a short distance to the east of the railroad line. In this area, the road heads past a few residences as it continues into Fairview Township and winds north past more forests with occasional homes. PA 437 makes a turn to the northwest as it passes over the railroad tracks and comes to its northern terminus at PA 309 in the community of Mountain Top.

== History ==
When Pennsylvania first legislated routes in 1911, the present-day alignment of PA 437 was not given a route number. The highway between White Haven and Mountain Top was a paved road by 1930. PA 437 was designated in the 1960s to follow its current alignment between PA 940 in White Haven and PA 309 in Mountain Top.

== Major intersections ==
The entire route is in Luzerne County.

Location	mi	km	Destinations	Notes
White Haven	0.000	0.000	PA 940 (Church Street/Berwick Street) to I-80 – Blakeslee	Southern terminus
Fairview Township	11.223	18.062	PA 309 (North Mountain Boulevard) – Wilkes-Barre, Hazleton	Northern terminus
1.000 mi = 1.609 km; 1.000 km = 0.621 mi

== PA 437 Truck ==
Pennsylvania Route 437 Truck
- Location: White Haven
- Length: 20.1 mi (32.3 km)
- Existed: 2013–2017

Pennsylvania Route 437 Truck was a truck route of PA 437 that bypassed a weight-restricted bridge over a tributary of Creasy Creek in Dennison Township, on which trucks over 28 tons and combination loads over 34 tons are prohibited. The route follows PA 940, I-80, and PA 309. It was signed in 2013. The bridge was completely reconstructed in 2017, and PennDOT removed all PA 437 Truck signs from the roads it followed.
