= North Branch Land Trust =

The North Branch Land Trust (commonly referred to as NBLT) is a conservation easement group that aims to buy the developing rights to land in the Back Mountain area of the Northeastern part of Pennsylvania. The North Branch Land Trust was established in 1993 and has grown from one conserved property a year to over 12,000 acres of conserved land. The watersheds affected by the NBLT are the Susquehanna River and Delaware River watersheds.

North Branch has conserved privately owned farms and camps, and bought entire pieces of property. The mission of this conservation easement is to aim for the long-term management of natural resources by the conserving forests and woodlands and preserving the land for continuous use. North Branch works with landowners to sell the developing rights to the land. This will not only help with evening out the construction rate but also help the ecosystem and the watersheds in this area.

== History ==
The North Branch Land Trust works to conserve the landscapes that sustain the earth through the landowners and their communities. The NBLT originated in 1993 when friends and neighbors wanted a way to protect their land from developers. In 1995, a couple looking to preserve their 43-acre farm near Shickshinny in Luzerne County, Pennsylvania became the first of many properties conserved by the North Branch Land Trust.

== Mission ==
The North Branch Land Trust's mission is to help landowners conserve their property and help communities establish smart growth strategies for the benefit of their citizens. NBLT aims for the long-term management of natural resources by the conserving and preserving forests and woodlands, watersheds and waterways, wildlife habitat, agricultural lands and open space in both rural and urban areas. The North Branch protects and enhances scenic natural beauty and cultural landmarks throughout the Back Mountain. The land owned by the NBLT is for public use at any time during the year. Anyone may use the trails and land at their leisure. The North Branch intends to preserve these lands for the use of the community and the protection of the land.

== Conserved lands ==
Since the North Branch Land Trust has been conserving lands there has been a total of 53 properties and 10,831 acres, across eight counties in the Northeastern region of Pennsylvania conserved. That does not include the 1,250 acres that the North Branch owns completely. In these counties, countless properties have environmental treasures that are nearly extinct. Such as spring seeps, vernal pools, acidic shrub swamps, rare red spruce swamps, and an extremely rare glacial kettle bog. This all consumes one property, Bear Creek Camp in Luzerne County. There are other lands conserved with special and biologically significant features such as the Macialek property, and Kuryloski Woods. In 2010 NBLT conserved 3,000 acres in Luzerne County. This property, named after the fact that it was sold for only half its worth, Mocanaqua Tract was preserved to save the rare cranberry bog and orchids that grow on this property. Like most of the lands conserved by the NBLT this property also has a trail system that the public may use at any time.

== Watershed ==
In the Northeastern part of Pennsylvania the watershed is the north branch of the Susquehanna River and the Delaware watershed. Some of the properties eventually end up in the Susquehanna River and the other in the Delaware River, which is one of the very reasons the North Branch Land Trust formed. The purpose of the Land Trust is to not only protect the land from being ruined by developers, but also protect the land and rivers downstream and throughout the rest of that side of the state. By protecting the land, the streams can stay free of pollution from humans and construction. The Bureau of Conservation and Restoration is a department through the state of Pennsylvania that aims to bring polluted streams and lakes off of the impaired waters list.
