= Crestwood High School (Pennsylvania) =

Coordinates: 41.1397°N 75.9037°W

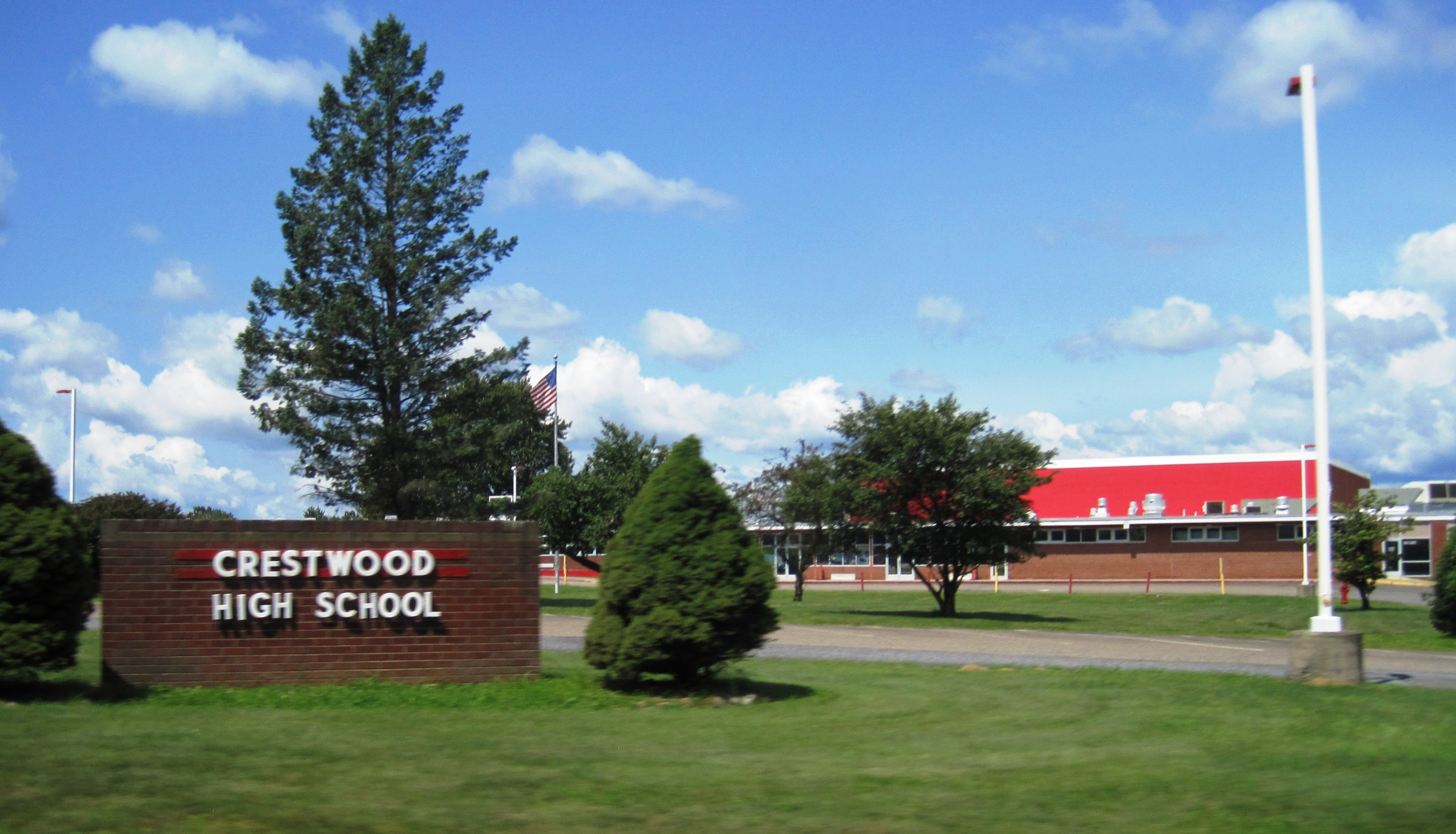
- Mountain Top, Luzerne County, Pennsylvania, United States

Information
- Type: Public
- School district: Crestwood School District
- Principal: John Gorham
- Faculty: 52
- Grades: 7–12
- Enrollment: 1,381 (2023–2024)
- Colors: Red & White
- Athletics: Soccer, Field Hockey, Football, Tennis, Golf, Swimming, Cross Country, Track and Field, Basketball, Wrestling, Soft Ball, Baseball, Lacrosse
- Athletics conference: Wyoming Valley Conference
- Mascot: The Comet
- Website: secondary.csdcomets.org

Crestwood High School, also known as the Crestwood Secondary Campus, is a ninth through twelfth grade, suburban, public high school located on Route 309 in Mountain Top, Pennsylvania, United States. It is the only high school in the Crestwood School District, which encompasses an area of 110 square miles (280 km^{2}) with a combined population of 19,383. According to the National Center for Education Statistics, in 2022–2023, Crestwood High School reported an enrollment of 1,419 pupils in grades 7th through 12th.

Students at Crestwood High School may choose from numerous academic, athletic, and co-curricular programs, but mainly focusing on humanities, mathematics and science, business, fine arts, and vocational-technical programs. This allows students not only to be prepared for 2 year or 4 year colleges, but also the workforce or military service. Added on to the High School's building, in 2000, was the seventh through eighth grade Middle School.

In December 2006, an F2 tornado tore through the back area of the high school. There was no serious or irreparable damage done to the section. The roof of the high school gym collapsed while the girls' basketball team was inside, but no one was hurt.

== Extracurriculars ==
The district offers a wide variety of clubs, activities and sports teams.

Some of the sports programs make it to Regional and Districts Championships, and some make it to States. The field hockey team has won four state titles, the most in Pennsylvania, and makes it to states almost every year, the basketball team has won five District Championships in the past six years, and the tennis, track and field and wrestling teams have also placed at Districts. In 2004, a turf stadium was added for the football, soccer, field hockey teams, and Marching band performances. The school's mascot is the Comet. Its colors are red and white with a touch of black.

== Communities Served by Crestwood High School ==
- Dorrance Township
- Fairview Township
- Nuangola
- White Haven
- Wright Township
- Slocum Township
- Dennison Township
- Rice Township
- Penn Lake

== Notable alumni ==
- Martin Bibla, class of 1997, college football for the University of Miami, professional football for the Atlanta Falcons.
- Diane Madl Olympic Field Hockey Member.
- Sara Silvetti, class of 2000, 2008 Olympic Field Hockey Member and U.S. Field Hockey National Team Member
- Matt Wotherspoon, baseball player
