= Pennsylvania House of Representatives, District 117 =

American legislative district

Pennsylvania's 117th State House of Representatives district
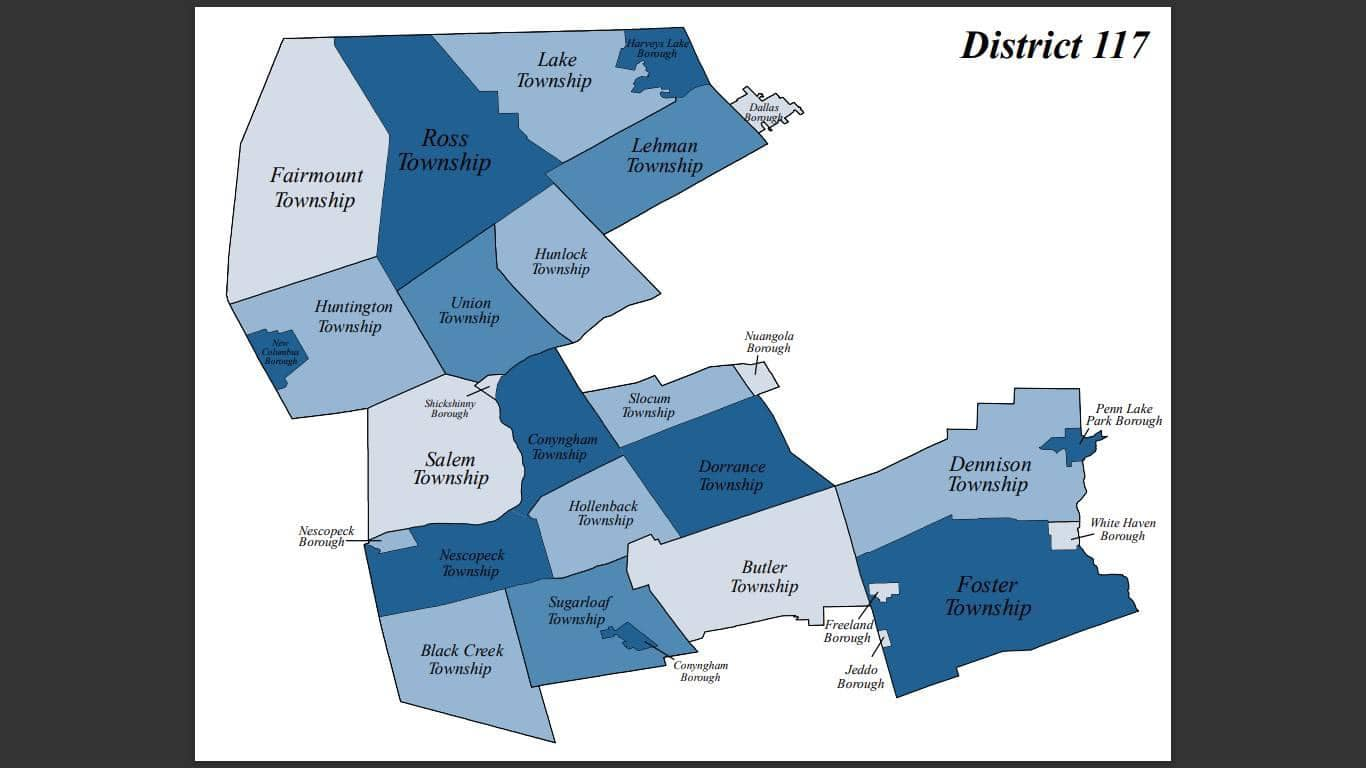
Representative
Jamie Walsh; R–Luzerne County
- Population: 61,755

The 117th Pennsylvania House of Representatives District is located in Luzerne County and includes the following areas:

- Black Creek Township
- Butler Township
- Conyngham Borough
- Conyngham Township
- Dallas Borough
- Dennison Township
- Dorrance Township
- Fairmount Township
- Foster Township
- Freeland Borough
- Harvey's Lake Borough
- Hollenback Township
- Hunlock Township
- Huntington Township
- Jeddo Borough
- Lake Township
- Lehman Township
- Nescopeck Borough
- Nescopeck Township
- New Columbus Borough
- Ross Township
- Salem Township
- Shickshinny Borough
- Slocum Township
- Sugarloaf Township
- Union Township
- White Haven Borough

== Representatives ==
Representative	Party	Years	District home	Note
Prior to 1969, seats were apportioned by county.
Stanley Meholchick	Democrat	1969 – 1972		Retired
George C. Hasay	Republican	1973 – 2006		Retired
Karen Boback	Republican	2007 – 2023	Harveys Lake	Retired
Mike Cabell	Republican	2023 – 2024		Defeated in primary
Jamie Walsh	Republican	2024 – present		Incumbent
