= Hasay =

Hasay is a surname. Notable people with the surname include:

- George Hasay (born 1948), American politician
- Jordan Hasay (born 1991), American middle-distance runner
