= Nuangola, Pennsylvania =

Borough in Pennsylvania, US

- Borough
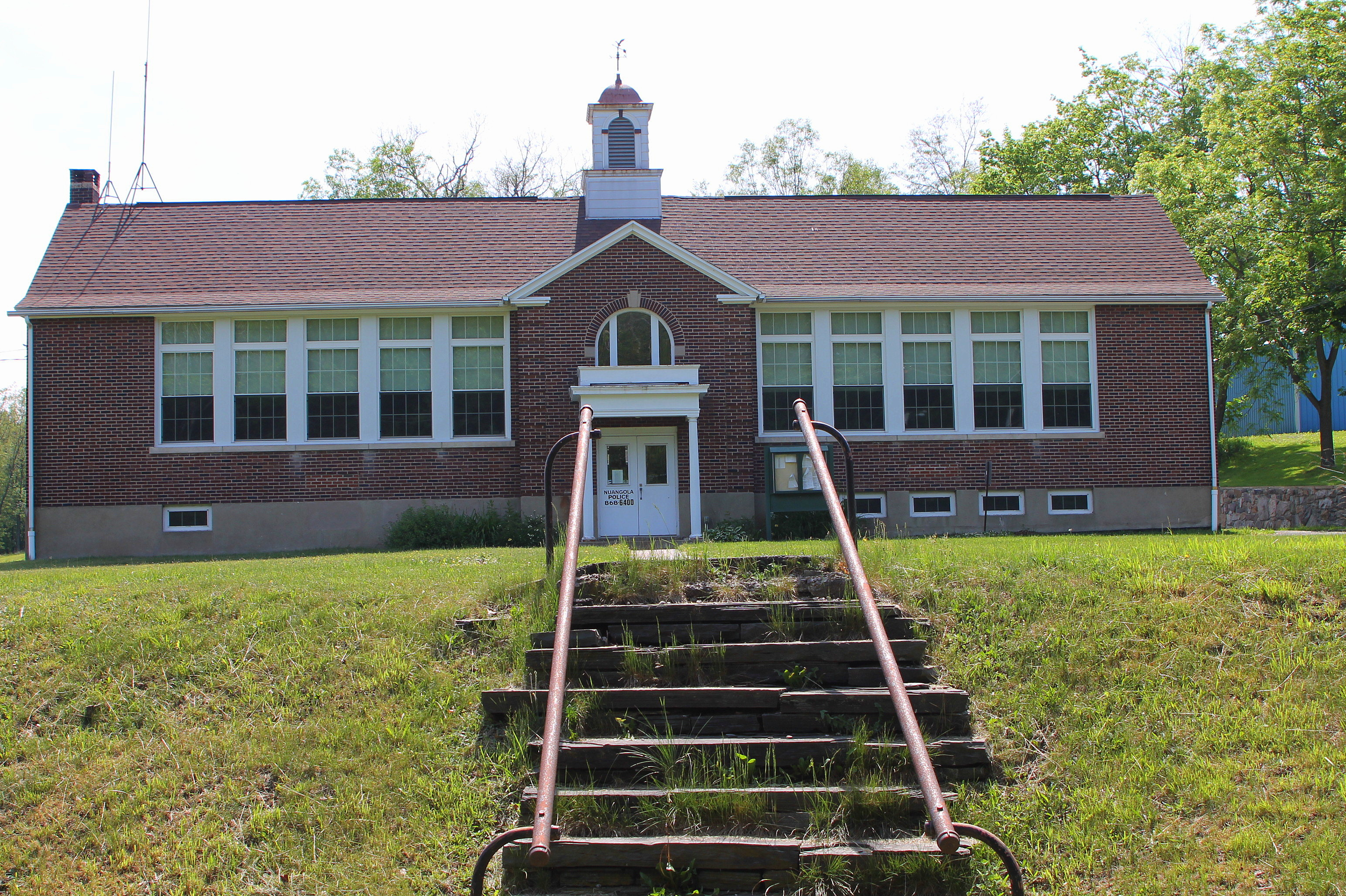
- Nuangola Municipal Building

- Location of Nuangola in Luzerne County, Pennsylvania.

- Location within Pennsylvania Location within the United States
- Coordinates: 41°09′26″N 75°58′37″W
- Country: United States
- State: Pennsylvania
- County: Luzerne
- Incorporated: 1908

Government
  - Type: Borough Council

Area
  - Total: 1.34 sq mi (3.47 km^{2})
  - Land: 1.19 sq mi (3.07 km^{2})
  - Water: 0.16 sq mi (0.41 km^{2})

Population (2020)
  - Total: 666
  - Density: 562.7/sq mi (217.25/km^{2})
- Time zone: UTC-5 (Eastern (EST))
  - Summer (DST): UTC-4 (EDT)
- Area code: 570
- FIPS code: 42-55752

Nuangola is a borough in Luzerne County, Pennsylvania. The population was 663 as of the 2020 census. Developed as a summer resort in the early 20th century, the borough is built around a heart-shaped lake called Nuangola Lake.

== History ==
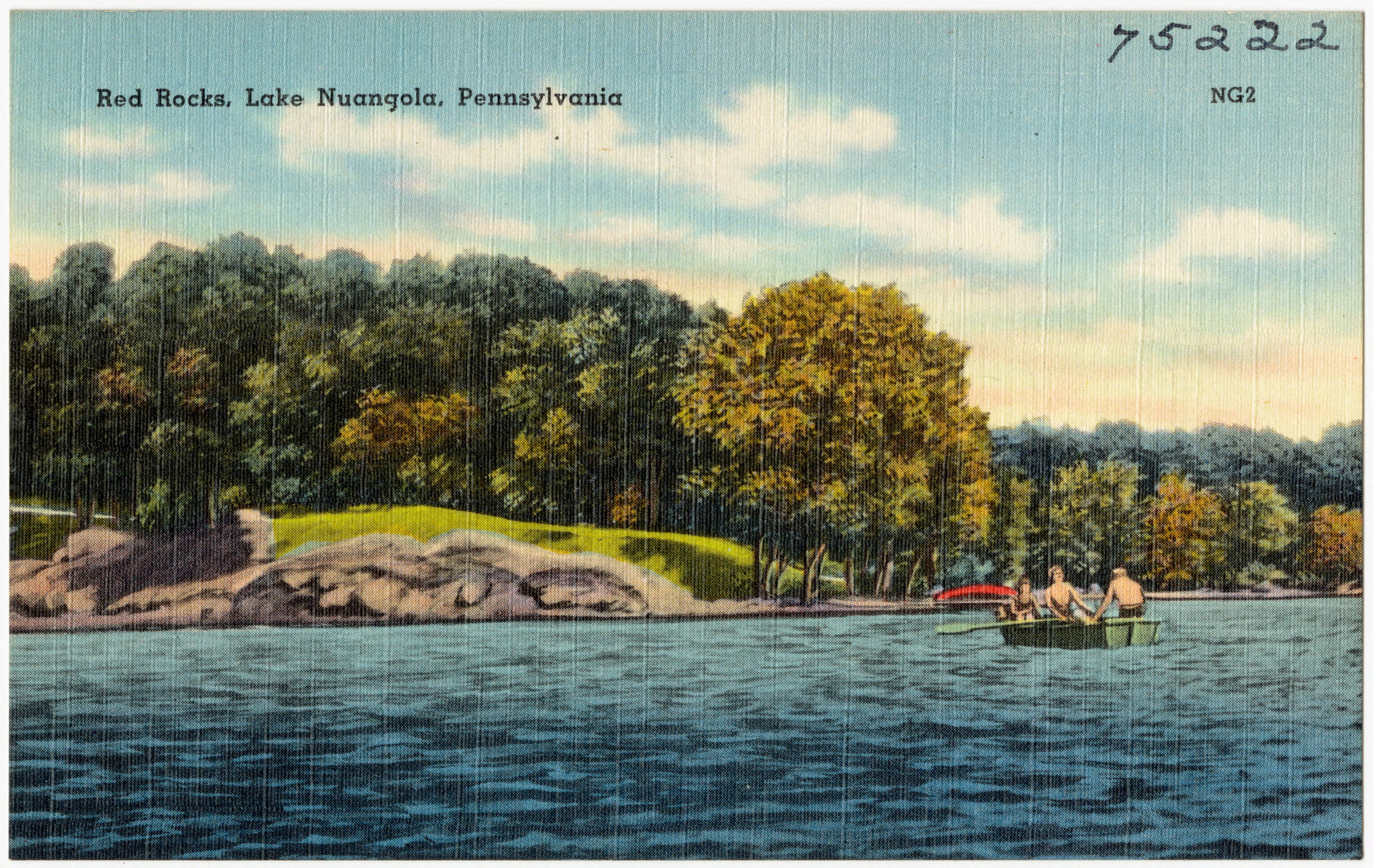
Lake Nuangola

=== Origin of name ===
The name Nuangola probably derives from an Algonquian language, which was spoken by the indigenous Native Americans of the area (most likely the Delaware (Lenape), the region's largest tribe. Some Nanticoke and Shawnee also lived there at the time). According to legend, a Native American maiden named Nuangola is believed to have drowned in the lake. Another account says that Nuangola is a Native American word (probably from an Algonquian language) for "Three-Cornered Lake" or "Triangular Lake." Early settlers named its this, but the name was changed to Nuangola to avoid confusion with other towns in Pennsylvania. It has also been suggested that Nuangola means "people of the north."

=== Incorporation ===
Nuangola was incorporated as a borough in 1908. Two years later, in 1910, the population of the new town was just over one hundred people. In the following decades, the population grew. The county became a center of mining and attracted many European immigrants.

But in the 20th century, this area was developed as a summer resort around the lake. Today, over six hundred people reside in Nuangola. Some are retirees; others have second homes here. The population increases in the summer.

=== Grove Theatre ===
Nuangola is home of the Grove Theatre. From the 1930s through the 1950s, it was a popular summer stock playhouse. Kirk Douglas, Joseph Cotten, Jean Kerr, and many other notable actors had early roles there.

After having been closed for decades, the theatre was reopened in 2006 as a Non-Equity stock theatre. Since then, the theatre has produced the following: Godspell, On Golden Pond, Plaza Suite, Prisoner of Second Avenue, Ring of Fire, A Christmas Carol, and many others.

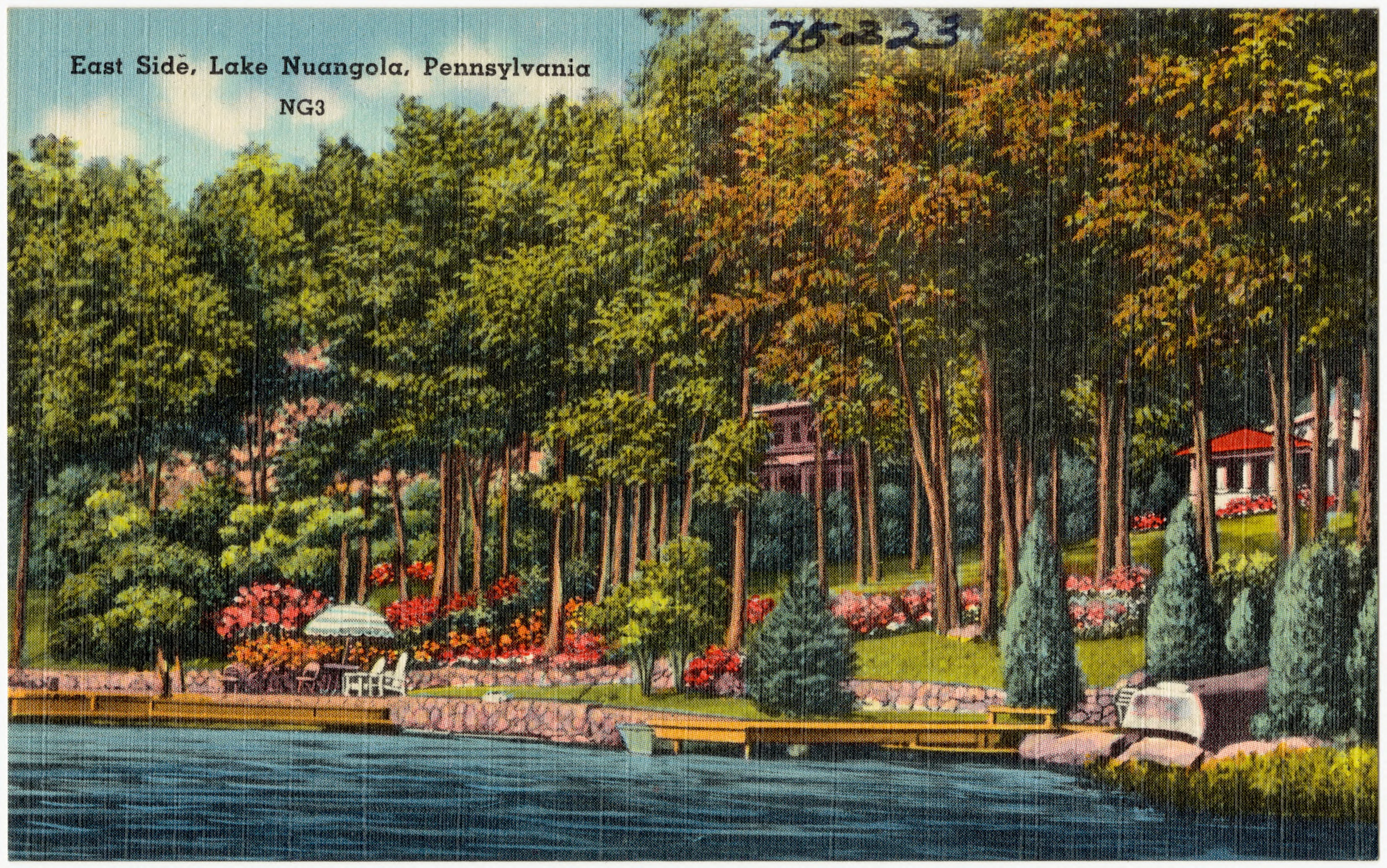
East side of Lake Nuangola

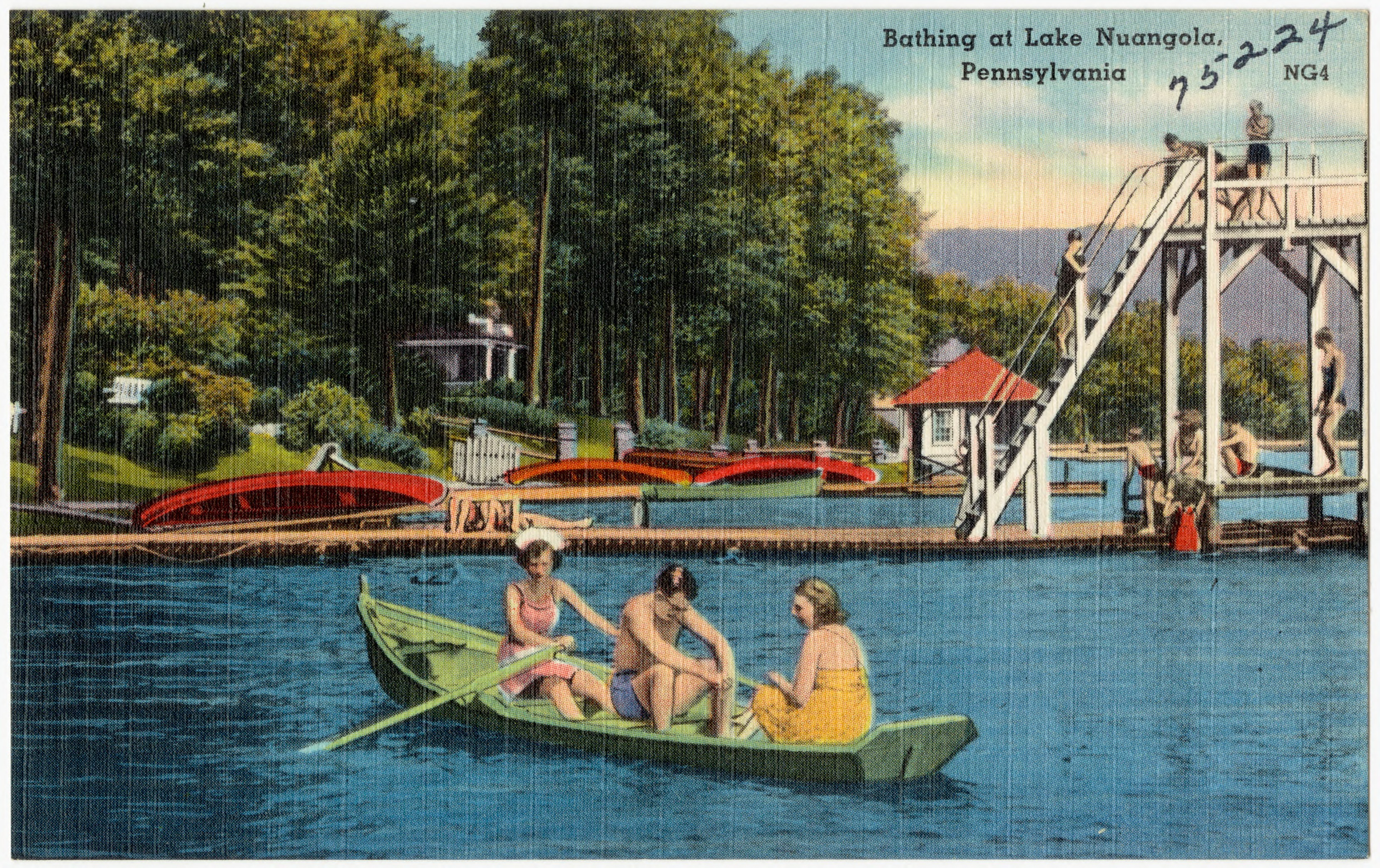
Lake Nuangola

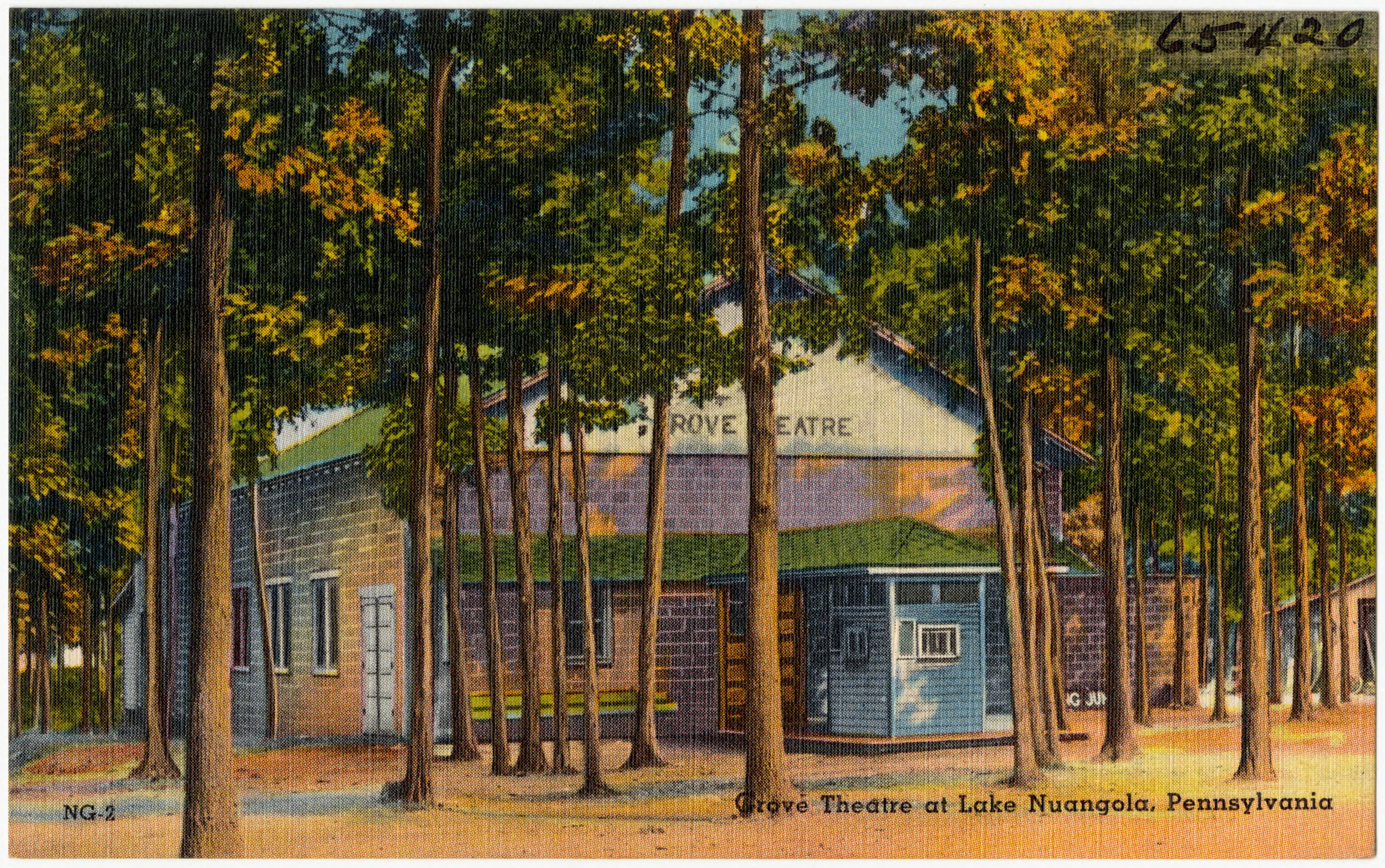
Grove Theatre at Lake Nuangola

== Geography ==
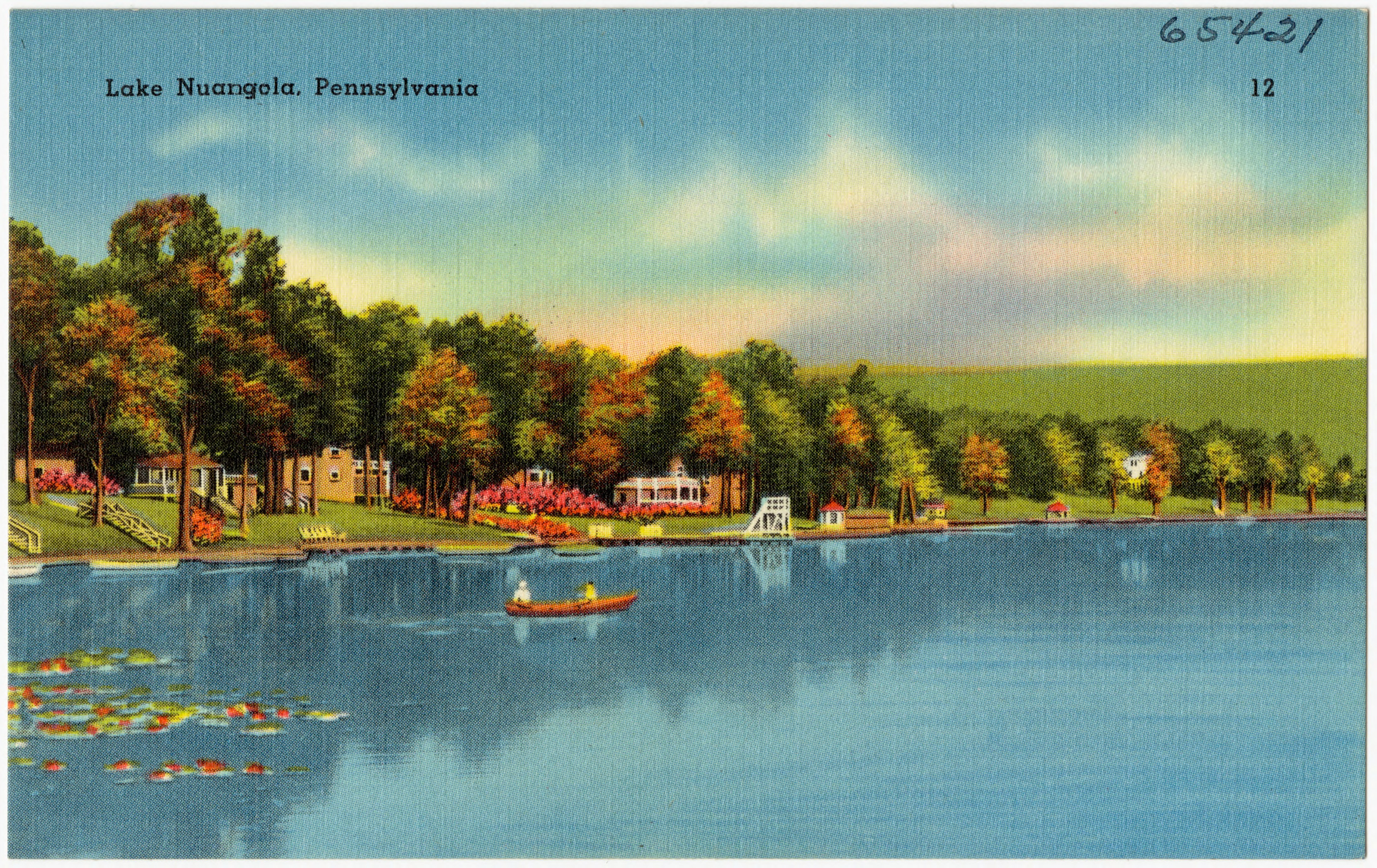
Lake Nuangola

Nuangola is located at 41°09′26″N 75°58′37″W.

According to the United States Census Bureau, the borough has a total area of 1.2 square miles (3.1 km^{2}), of which 1.0 square mile (2.7 km^{2}) is land and 0.15 square miles (0.4 km^{2}), or 13.04%, is water. The town is situated around Nuangola Lake. It is part of the Crestwood School District.

Nuangola borders Hanover Township (to the northeast), Newport Township (to the northwest), Rice Township (to the east and south), Dorrance Township (to the south), and Slocum Township (to the west).

=== Transportation ===
Interstate 81 is the only major highway within proximity to Nuangola. The interstate is east of the borough. It links Nuangola to the county seat of Wilkes-Barre (in the north) and the city of Hazleton (in the south).

== Public safety ==
- Police services are provided by the Rice Township Police Department (PD 72).
- Fire protection services are provided by the Nuangola Volunteer Fire Department (Station 164).
- Emergency medical services are provided by the Mountain Top Community Ambulance Association (Medic 37 and Ambulance 532), which is located in Fairview Township.

== Demographics ==
Historical population
Census	Pop.	Note	%±
1910	124		—
1920	87		−29.8%
1930	241		177.0%
1940	309		28.2%
1950	295		−4.5%
1960	346		17.3%
1970	464		34.1%
1980	726		56.5%
1990	701		−3.4%
2000	671		−4.3%
2010	679		1.2%
2020	666		−1.9%
2021 (est.)	667	▲	0.2%

As of the census of 2000, there were 671 people, 259 households, and 193 families residing in the borough. The population density was 594.7 inhabitants per square mile (229.6/km^{2}). There were 370 housing units at an average density of 327.9 per square mile (126.6/km^{2}). The racial makeup of the borough was 99.70% White and 0.30% Asian. Hispanic or Latino of any race were 0.30% of the population.

There were 259 households, out of which 30.5% had children under the age of 18 living with them, 62.5% were married couples living together, 8.5% had a female householder with no husband present, and 25.1% were non-families. 20.5% of all households were made up of individuals, and 5.0% had someone living alone who was 65 years of age or older. The average household size was 2.57 and the average family size was 2.95.

In the borough the population was spread out, with 21.3% under the age of 18, 6.9% from 18 to 24, 30.6% from 25 to 44, 28.6% from 45 to 64, and 12.7% who were 65 years of age or older. The median age was 40 years. For every 100 females there were 108.4 males. For every 100 females age 18 and over, there were 104.7 males.

The median income for a household in the borough was $41,964, and the median income for a family was $45,833. Males had a median income of $33,000 versus $27,500 for females. The per capita income for the borough was $16,851. About 7.9% of families and 11.8% of the population were below the poverty line, including 21.1% of those under age 18 and none of those age 65 or over.

== Education ==
The school district is the Crestwood School District.
