= Matt Wotherspoon =

American baseball player (born 1991)

- Pitcher
- Born: October 6, 1991 (age 34); Mountain Top, Pennsylvania, U.S.
- Batted: Right Threw: Right

MLB debut
- April 3, 2019, for the Baltimore Orioles

Last MLB appearance
- June 23, 2019, for the Baltimore Orioles

MLB statistics
- Win–loss record: 0–0
- Earned run average: 15.43
- Strikeouts: 2
- Stats at Baseball Reference

Teams
- Baltimore Orioles (2019)

Matt Mark Wotherspoon (born October 6, 1991) is an American former professional baseball pitcher. He played in Major League Baseball (MLB) for the Baltimore Orioles.

== Career ==
=== Amateur ===
Wotherspoon graduated from Crestwood High School in Mountain Top, Pennsylvania. He attended the University of Pittsburgh, where he played college baseball for the Pittsburgh Panthers.

=== New York Yankees ===
The New York Yankees selected Wotherspoon in the 34th round of the 2014 MLB draft. He signed and spent 2014 with the Staten Island Yankees where he had a 2–3 win-loss record with a 1.97 earned run average (ERA) in 32 innings pitched in relief. In 2015, Wotherspoon pitched for the Charleston RiverDogs, the Tampa Yankees, and the Trenton Thunder pitching to a 5–4 record and 4.05 ERA in 23 games, with 17 games started. In 2016, he played for Trenton and the Scranton/Wilkes-Barre RailRiders, compiling a 6–2 record, 2.50 ERA, and 1.11 WHIP in 36 games. He began 2017 with Trenton and was later promoted back to Scranton/Wilkes-Barre.

=== Baltimore Orioles ===
The Yankees traded Wotherspoon to the Orioles on July 2, 2017, for international signing bonus money. The Orioles assigned him to the Norfolk Tides and he finished the season there. In 67 2/3 relief innings between Trenton, Scranton/Wilkes-Barre, and Norfolk, he was 6–2 with a 2.00 ERA and 79 strikeouts. He pitched in 39 games for Norfolk in 2018, with 12 games started, and finished the season with a 4.60 ERA.

==== 2019 ====
The Orioles promoted Wotherspoon to the major leagues on April 3, 2019. He made his debut that afternoon, allowing three earned runs in two innings of relief, and was optioned back to Norfolk after the game. On April 6, 2019, Wotherspoon was outrighted off the roster to Triple-A. The Orioles selected his contract on June 22. On July 2, he was designated for assignment. He cleared waivers and was sent outright to Triple-A on July 6. On August 19, Baltimore released Wotherspoon.

=== Detroit Tigers ===
On August 23, 2019, the Detroit Tigers signed Wotherspoon to a minor league contract and assigned him to the Triple–A Toledo Mud Hens. In three appearances for Toledo, he logged a 3.00 ERA with eight strikeouts and one save across six innings pitched. Wotherspoon became a minor league free agent on November 4.

== Personal life ==
After the 2015 season, Wotherspoon worked to complete his undergraduate degree at Wilkes University. He now resides in Mountain Top where he lives under the radar out of the spotlight with his wife and three kids. Matt continues to be a mentor in the community helping rising players in his area get the advice they need to play at the next level
