= Mountain Top, Pennsylvania =

Unincorporated community in Pennsylvania, US

- Census-designated place
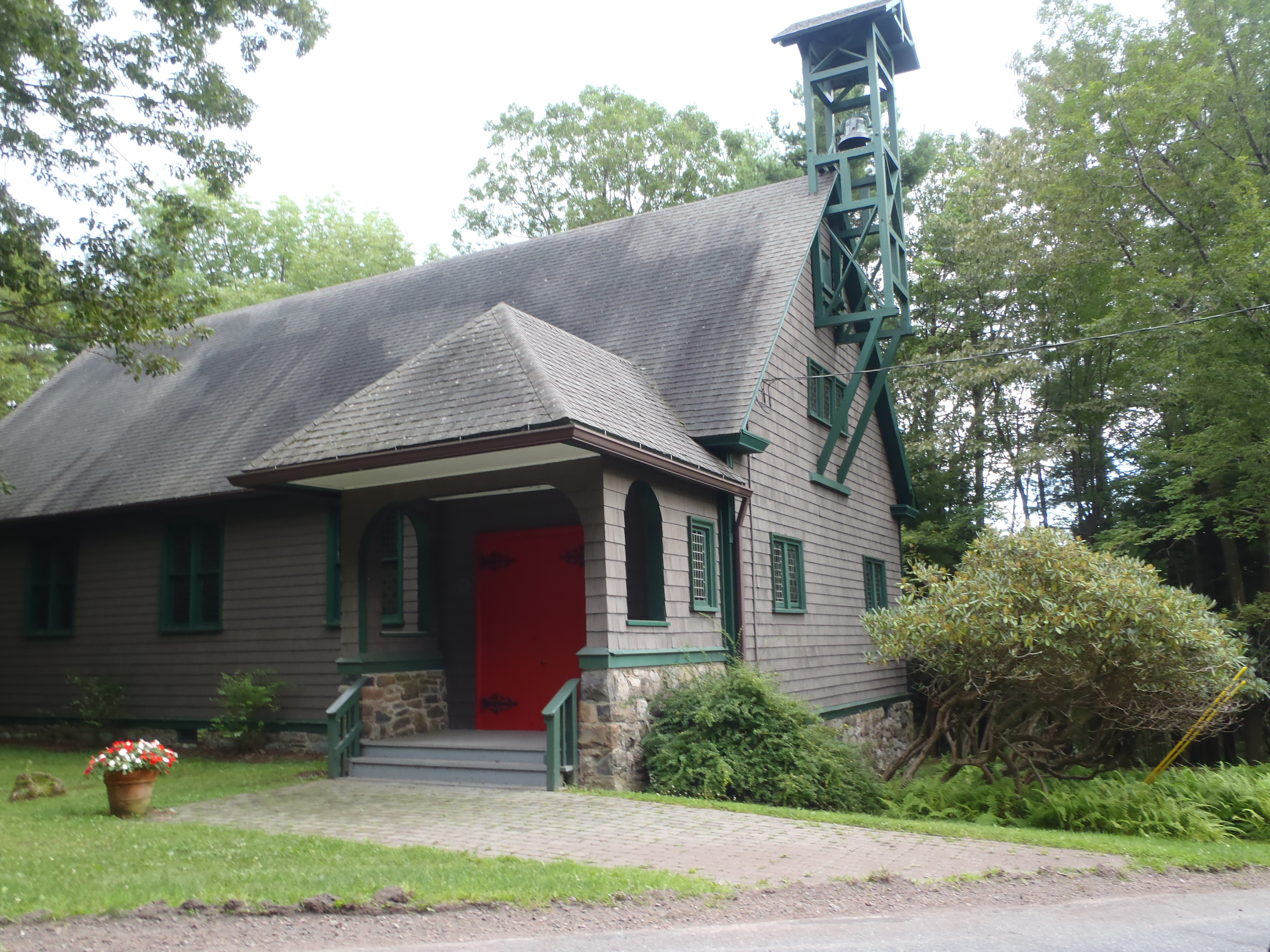
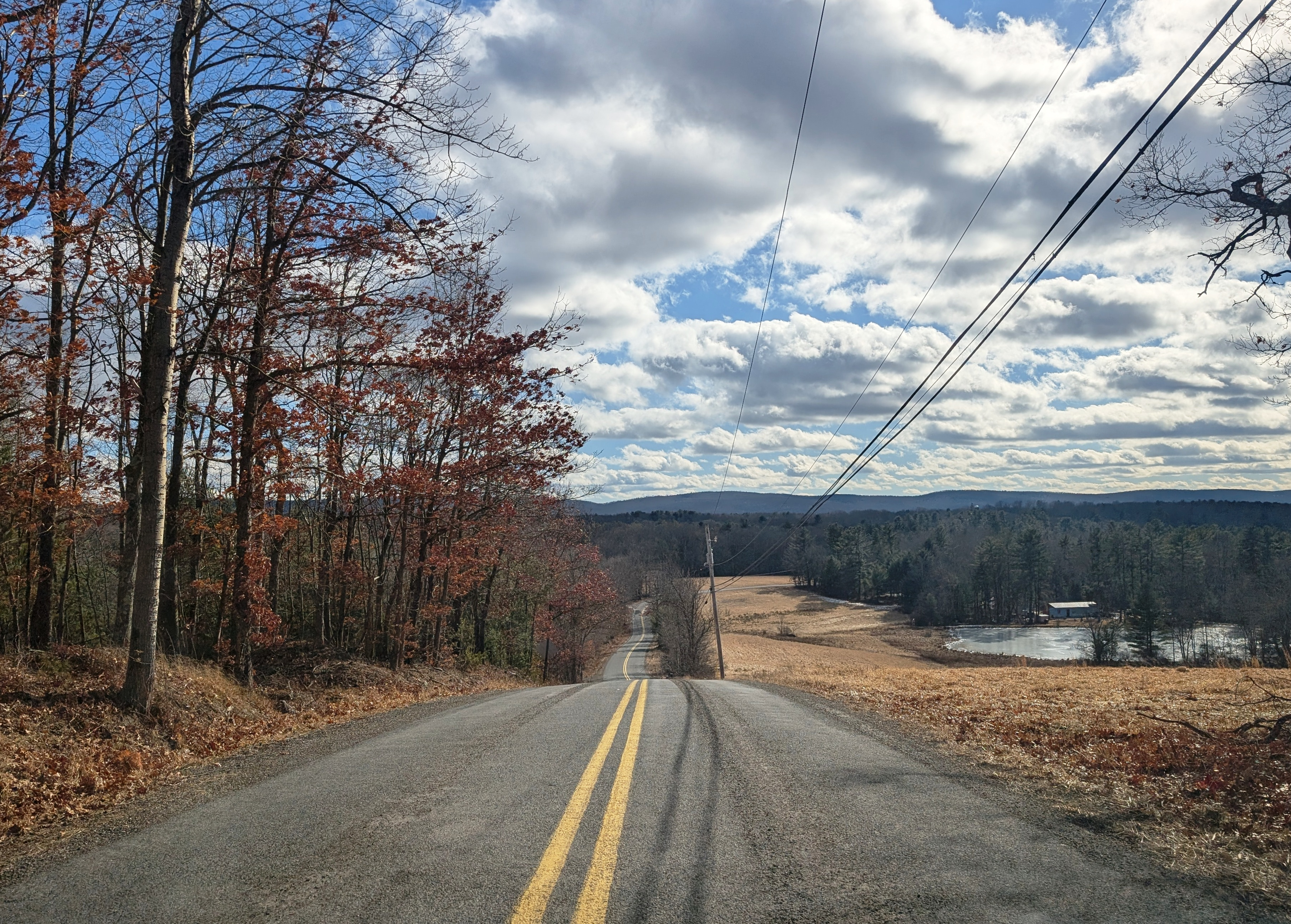
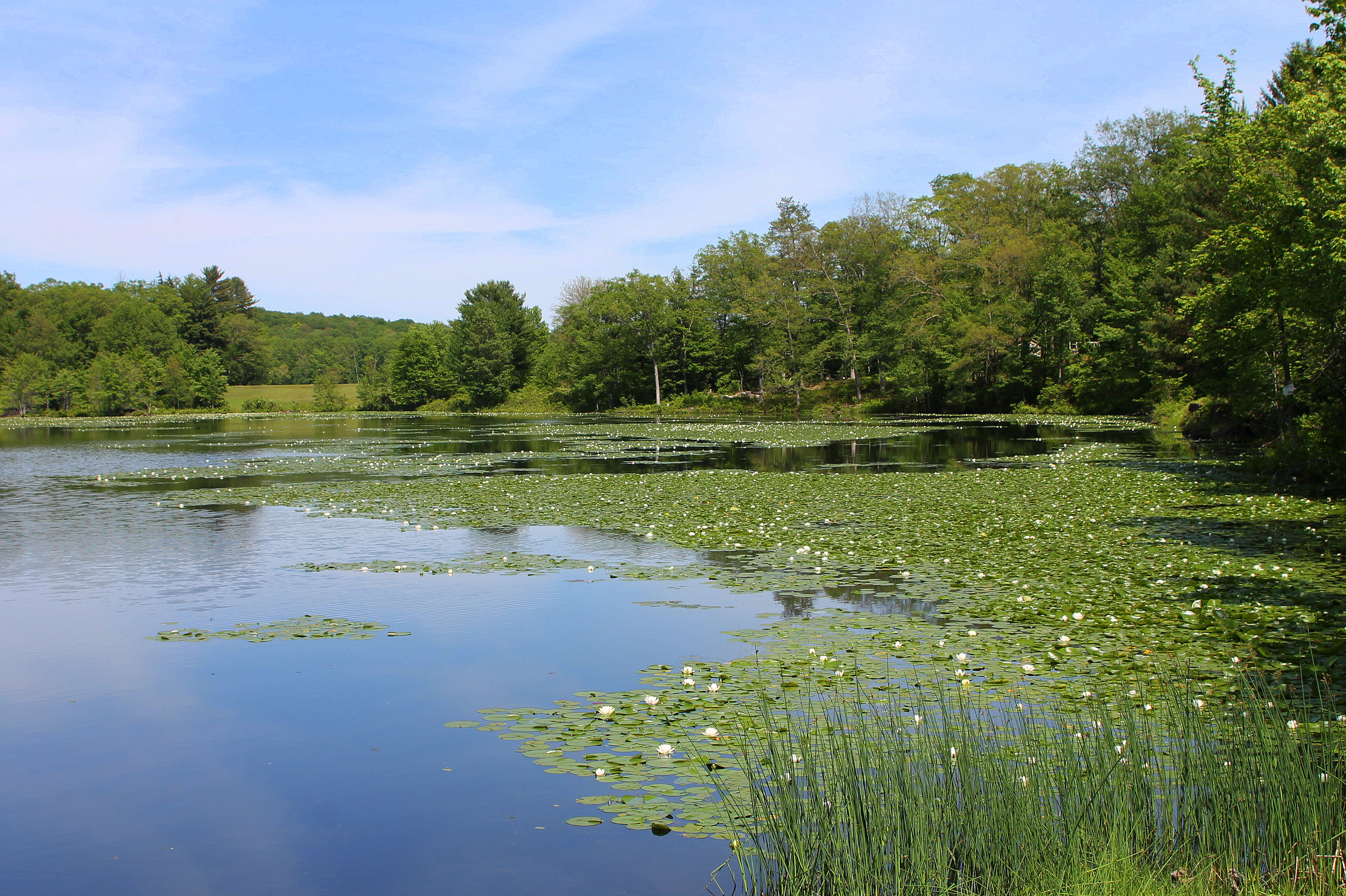
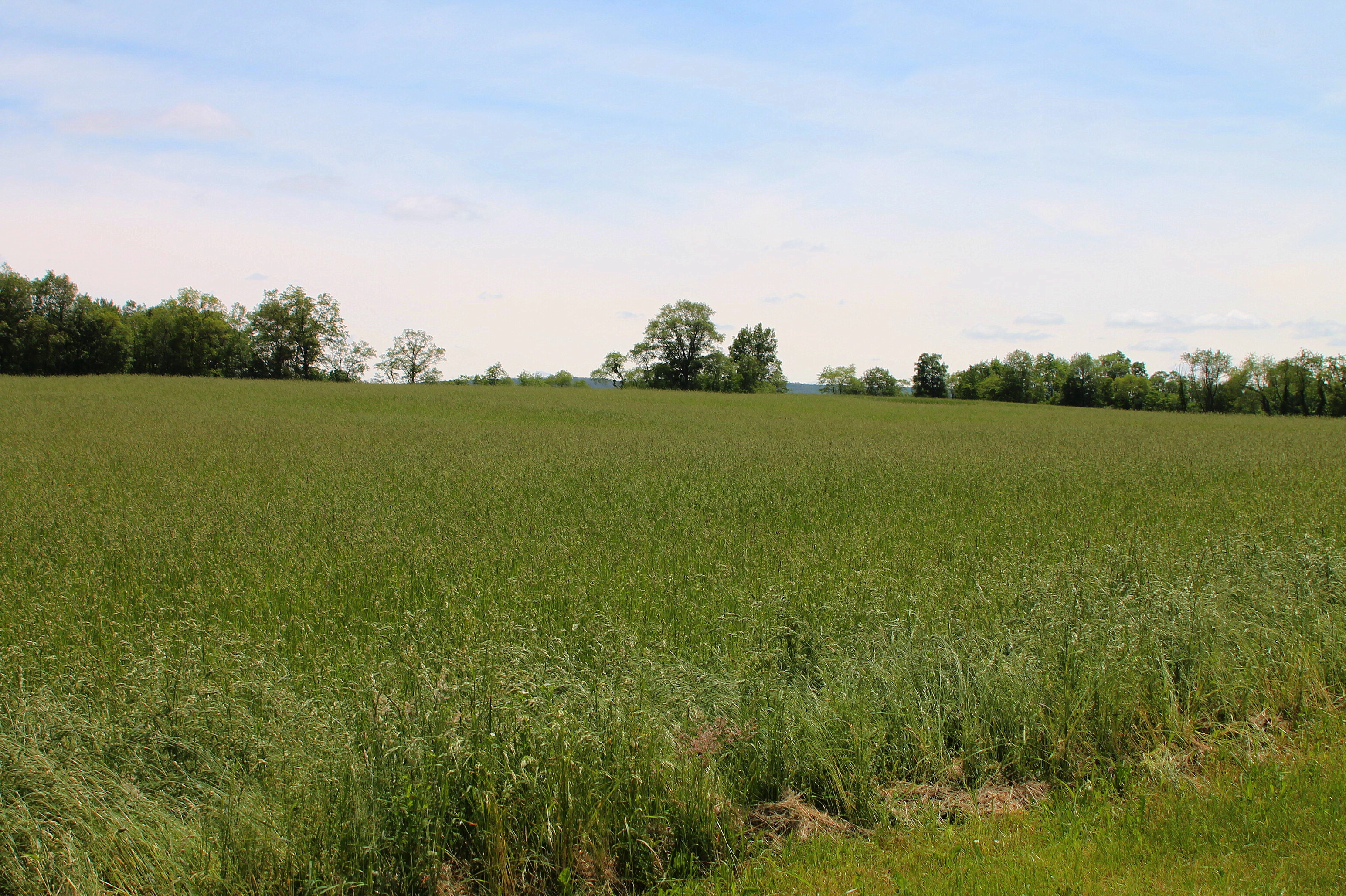
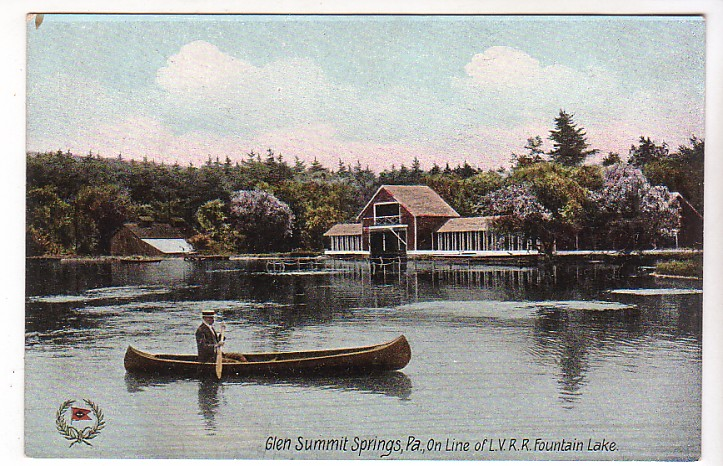
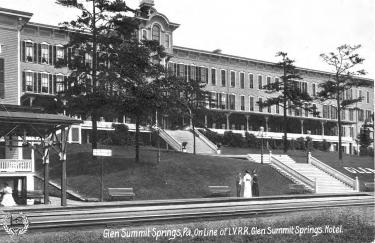
- From top, left to right: Glen Summit Chapel, St. Mary's Road in Dorrance Township, Blue Giant Meadow Lake, a typical field in Dorrance, Fountain Lake, the Glen Summit Hotel

- Location in Pennsylvania Location in the United States
- Coordinates: 41°10′12″N 75°52′36″W
- Country: United States
- State: Pennsylvania
- County: Luzerne
- Townships: Dorrance, Fairview, Rice, Wright

Area
  - Total: 15.02 sq mi (38.90 km^{2})
  - Land: 15.02 sq mi (38.90 km^{2})
  - Water: 0 sq mi (0.00 km^{2})
- Elevation: 1,580 ft (480 m)

Population (2020)
  - Total: 11,489
  - Density: 764.8/sq mi (295.31/km^{2})
- Time zone: UTC-5 (Eastern (EST))
  - Summer (DST): UTC-4 (EDT)
- ZIP Code: 18707
- Area codes: 570 and 272
- FIPS code: 42-51384
- GNIS feature ID: 2389520

Mountain Top is an unincorporated area and census-designated place (CDP) in Luzerne County, Pennsylvania, United States. As of the 2020 census, its population was 11,489. If Mountain Top were an incorporated municipality, it would rank 4th out of 76 in Luzerne County (in terms of population), just ahead of Hanover Township.

The census-designated place of Mountain Top is located along Pennsylvania Route 309, south of Wilkes-Barre, in Dorrance, Fairview, Rice, and Wright townships. However, many equate the Mountain Top area with the Crestwood School District footprint, which has roughly 20,563 residents, covers over 110 square miles (280 km^{2}), and includes Dennison Township, Dorrance Township, Fairview Township, Nuangola Borough, Rice Township, Slocum Township, White Haven Borough, Wright Township, and Penn Lake Borough.

== Name ==
The United States Postal Service uses the spelling "Mountain Top" for ZIP Code 18707, and the Pennsylvania Department of Transportation spells it "Mountain Top" on a Pennsylvania driver's license. However, some businesses in Mountain Top spell their community as a single word, "Mountaintop".

== History ==
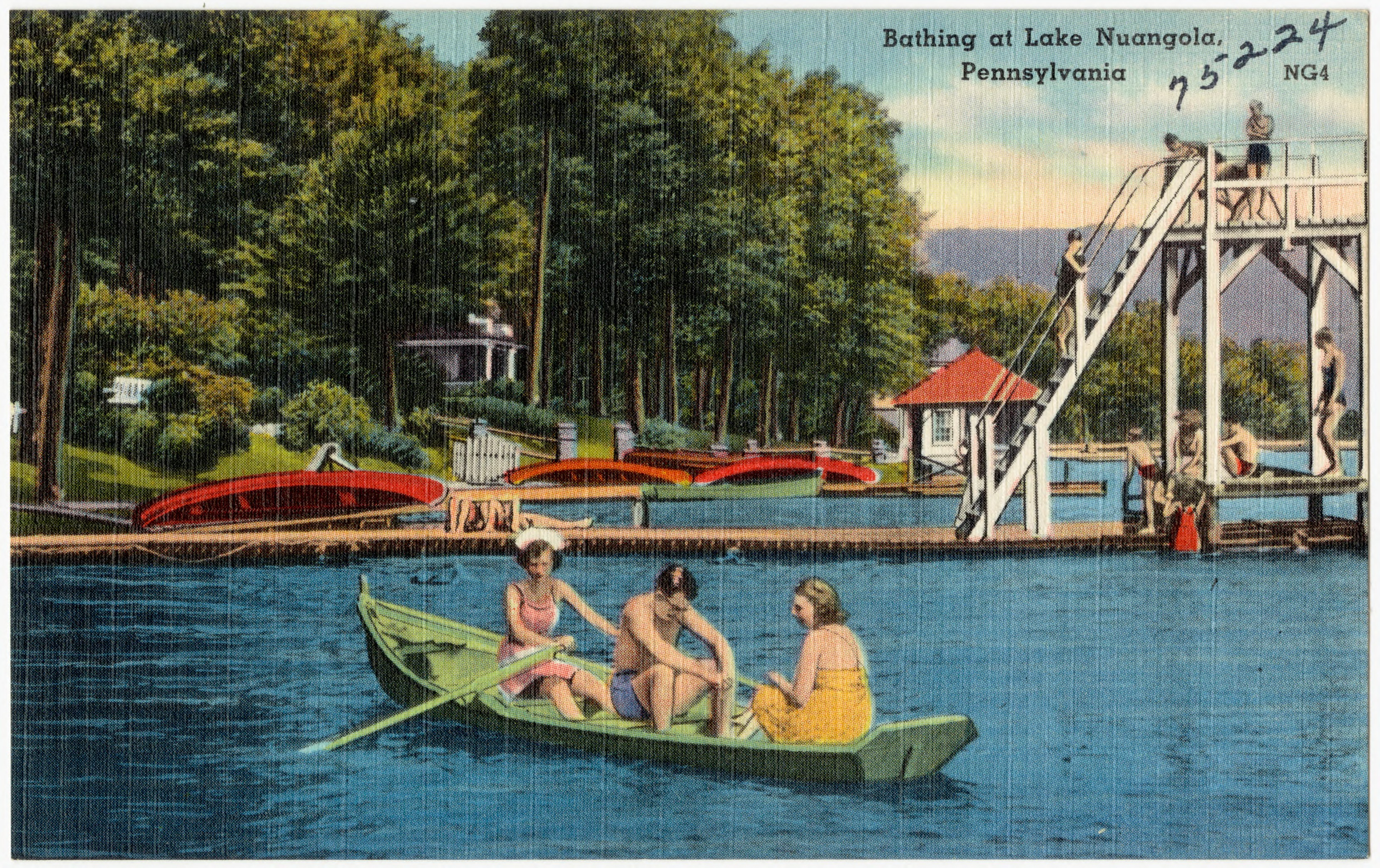
Lake Nuangola

The first white settlers utilized the region's thick forests for logging. They erected several sawmills in the area.

Dorrance Township was officially formed in 1840, when it broke away from Newport Township. By 1860, over five hundred people lived within the township. In 1865, the community had several sawmills, gristmills, and at least one tavern.

On April 12, 1851, Wright Township was formed from a segment of Hanover Township. The new township was named after the Hon. Hendrick B. Wright of Wilkes-Barre.

In September 1888, the court appointed several commissioners to examine and report whether dividing Wright Township would be feasible. The men reported in favor of division. The court approved the report, and a referendum on the question of division was held in 1889. On May 6, the court — in accordance with the affirmative vote — ordered for the division of Wright Township. The new territory was named Fairview Township.

Rice Township was officially established in 1928 from another section of Wright Township. In the 1920s and 30s, a major industry in Rice Township was the harvesting of ice, which was sold in both Wilkes-Barre and Hazleton. The ice industry faded with the growing popularity of the electric refrigerator.

== Geography ==
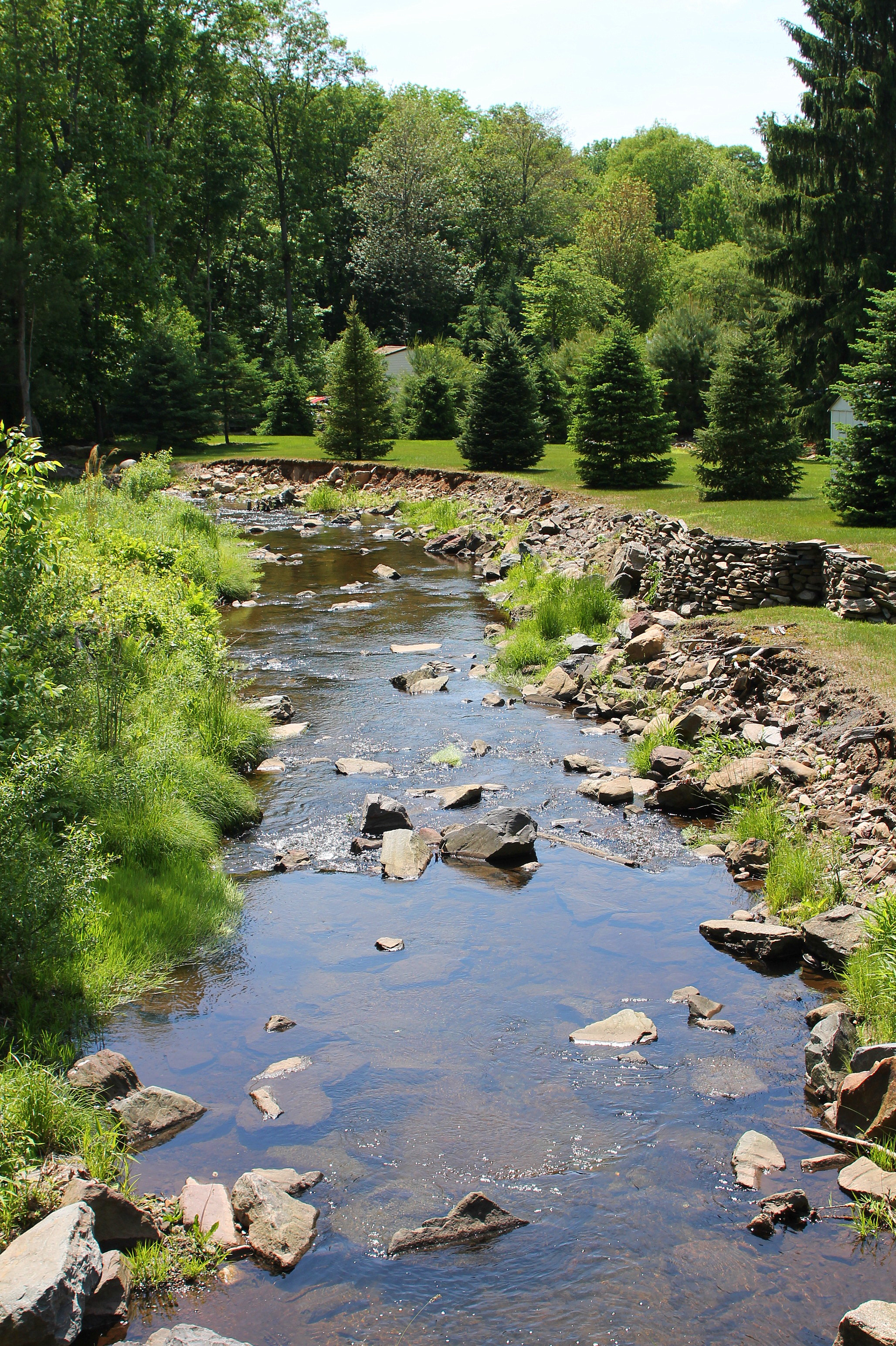
Bow Creek in Mountain Top

Mountain Top, once named "Penobscot", is located in central Luzerne County at 41°8′7″N 75°54′16″W (41.1353022, -75.9044749). The CDP extends north to Solomon Gap, which separates Penobscot Knob to the west from Haystack Mountain to the east. To the south, the CDP includes the settlements of Fairview Heights, Wech Corners, Rita, Albert, Rippletown, and Lindbergh. The ridge of Nescopeck Mountain is in the southeast part of Mountain Top. According to the U.S. Census Bureau, Mountain Top has a total area of 15.1 square miles (39.0 km^{2}), all of it land.

Mountain Top is in the Susquehanna River watershed. The village center sits on a drainage divide between Solomon Creek, which flows north through Solomon Gap to the Susquehanna near Wilkes-Barre, and Big Wapwallopen Creek, which flows to the southwest to the Susquehanna at Wapwallopen. East of Mountain Top, the ground rises to Arbutus Peak and Stony Cabin Ridge, both 2,080 feet (630 m) above sea level, beyond which is the Lehigh River basin leading to the Delaware River. Mountain Top is 10 miles (16 km) northwest of White Haven, at the head end of the Lehigh River, 16 miles (26 km) northeast of Hazleton, and 8 miles (13 km) south of Wilkes-Barre on Pennsylvania Route 309. Even though regional railroads are much diminished in scope and influence, Mountain Top Yard, once used as a marshaling yard at the top of the Ashley Planes' funicular railway, is still a regional element of the transportation infrastructure connecting Allentown and Philadelphia with points north and west via trackage to several yards in New York state.

The elevation in Mountain Top ranges from 1,070 feet (330 m) above sea level along Big Wapwallopen Creek in the southwest, to 1,860 feet (570 m) atop Nescopeck Mountain southwest of Rita, to 1,871 feet (570 m) at the east end of Penobscot Mountain in north Mountain Top. The central village of Mountain Top sits at 1,580 feet (480 m) just south of Penobscot Mountain.

== Demographics ==
Historical population
Census	Pop.	Note	%±
2010	10,982		—
2020	11,489		4.6%
U.S. Decennial Census

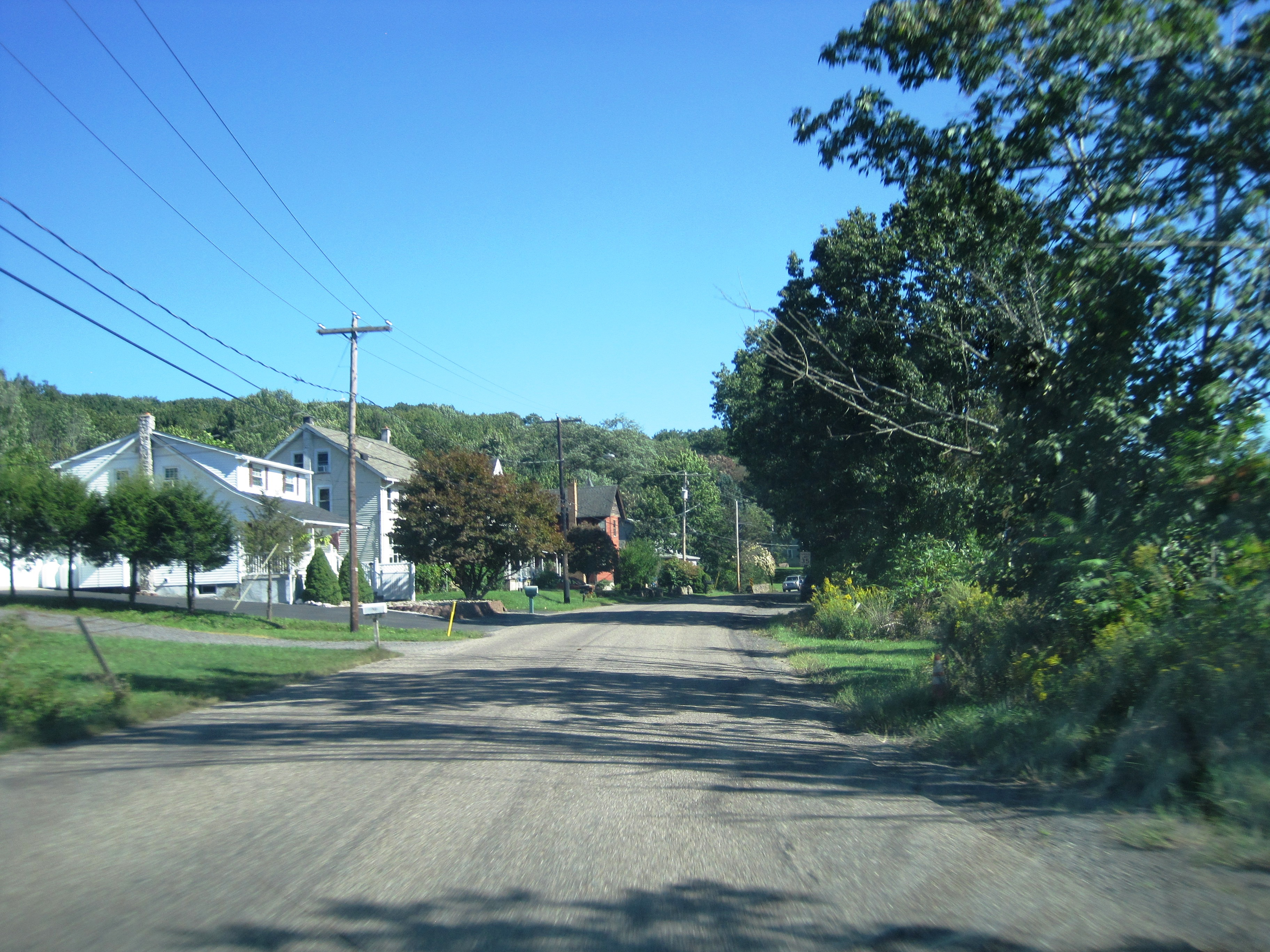
Houses in Mountain Top

=== 2020 census ===
As of the 2020 census, Mountain Top had a population of 11,489. The median age was 45.5 years. 20.8% of residents were under the age of 18 and 20.0% of residents were 65 years of age or older. For every 100 females there were 93.4 males, and for every 100 females age 18 and over there were 91.9 males age 18 and over.

90.9% of residents lived in urban areas, while 9.1% lived in rural areas.

There were 4,397 households in Mountain Top, of which 32.0% had children under the age of 18 living in them. Of all households, 60.5% were married-couple households, 12.3% were households with a male householder and no spouse or partner present, and 21.5% were households with a female householder and no spouse or partner present. About 21.7% of all households were made up of individuals and 11.1% had someone living alone who was 65 years of age or older.

There were 4,632 housing units, of which 5.1% were vacant. The homeowner vacancy rate was 1.2% and the rental vacancy rate was 5.7%.

Racial composition as of the 2020 census
Race	Number	Percent
White	10,302	89.7%
Black or African American	110	1.0%
American Indian and Alaska Native	4	0.0%
Asian	468	4.1%
Native Hawaiian and Other Pacific Islander	2	0.0%
Some other race	113	1.0%
Two or more races	490	4.3%
Hispanic or Latino (of any race)	378	3.3%

=== Demographic estimates ===
Pre-2020 estimates reported that the population density was 224.0 inhabitants per square mile (86.5/km^{2}), and that there were 4,394 families residing in the CDP. The average household size was 2.72 and the average family size was 3.10.

The housing unit density was 84.7 per square mile (32.7/km^{2}).

=== Income and poverty ===
The median income for a household in the CDP was $51,655, and the median income for a family was $58,588. Males had a median income of $41,271 versus $26,346 for females. The per capita income for the CDP was $22,480. About 2.9% of families and 3.4% of the population were below the poverty line, including 3.7% of those under age 18 and 5.4% of those age 65 or over.

== Education ==
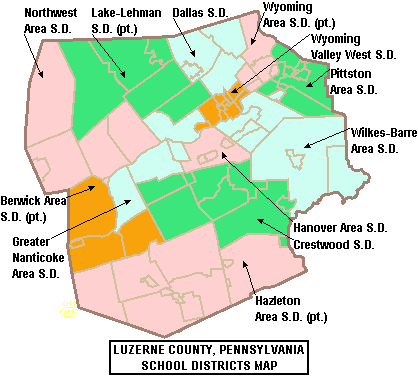
Map of Crestwood School District in Luzerne County

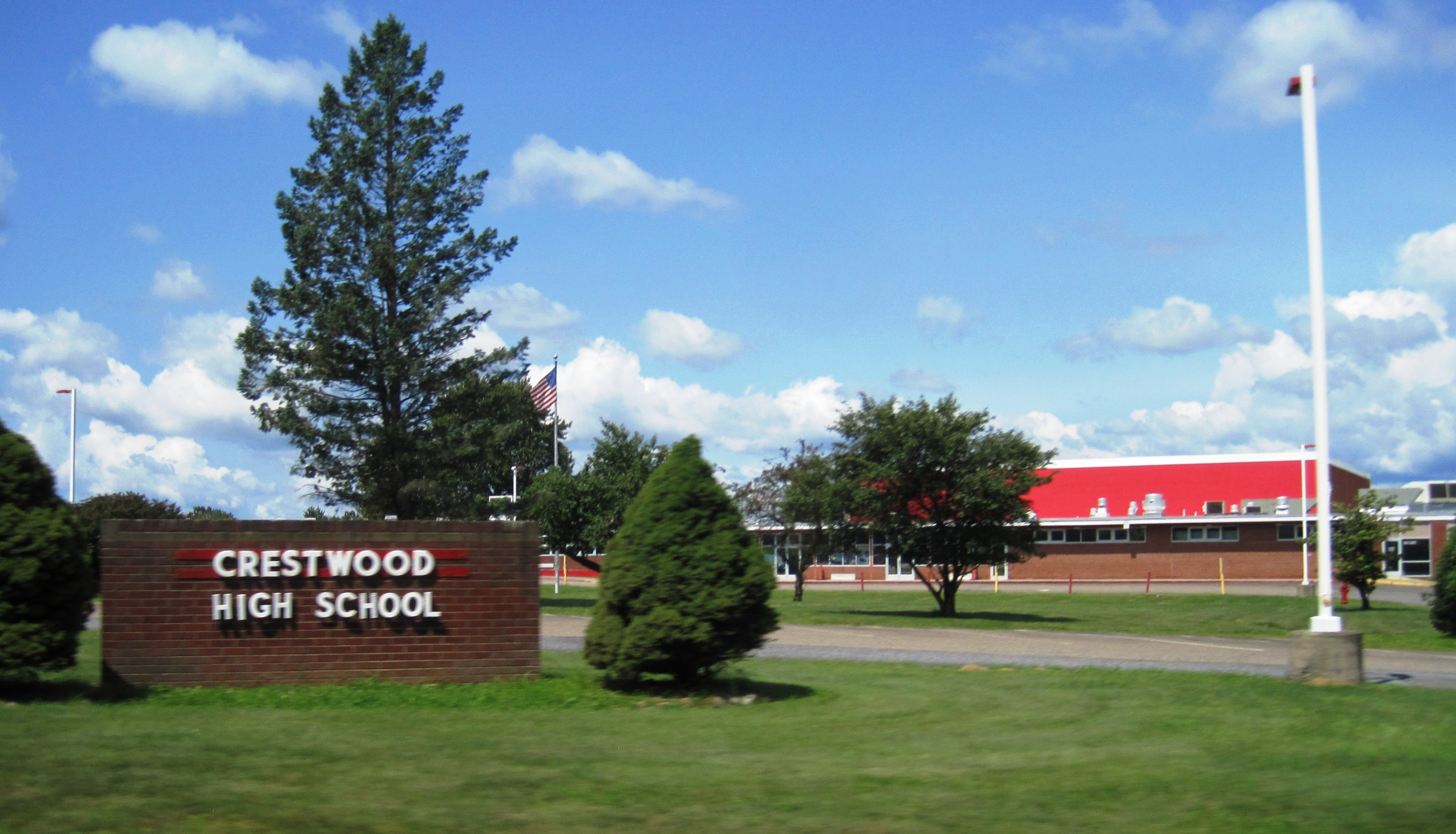
Crestwood High School

Many equate the Mountain Top area with the Crestwood School District footprint, which has roughly 20,563 residents, covers over 110 square miles (280 km^{2}), and includes Dennison Township, Dorrance Township, Fairview Township, Nuangola Borough, Rice Township, Slocum Township, White Haven Borough, Wright Township, and Penn Lake Borough.

The Crestwood School District consists of four schools:

- Rice Elementary School - Rice Township (Grades K-6).
- Fairview Elementary School - Fairview Township (Grades K-6)
- Crestwood Middle School - Wright Township (Grades 7 and 8)
- Crestwood High School - Wright Township (Grades 9–12).

Private education:

- St. Jude's Catholic School, in Wright Township, serves grades K-8, after which students can continue Catholic education at Holy Redeemer High School in Wilkes-Barre.
