= Crestwood School District (Pennsylvania) =

School district in Pennsylvania

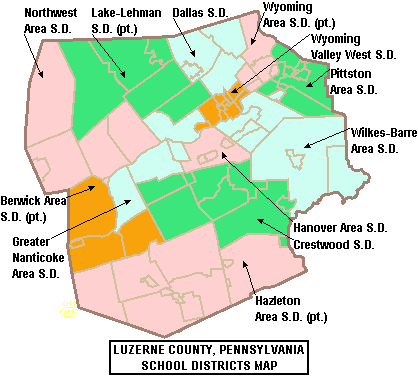

Address
- 281 South Mountain Boulevard Mountain Top, Pennsylvania, 18707; United States

District information
- Type: Public

Students and staff
- District mascot: Comets

Other information
- Website: www.csdcomets.org

The Crestwood School District is a midsized, suburban public school district which serves the Boroughs of Nuangola, Penn Lake Park and White Haven and Dennison Township, Dorrance Township, Fairview Township, Rice Township, Slocum Township and Wright Township in Luzerne County, Pennsylvania. Crestwood School District encompasses approximately 109.5 square miles (284 km^{2}). According to 2000 federal census data, it serves a resident population of 18,299.

In 2009, the district's per capita income was $21,944 while the median family income was $56,503. In the Commonwealth, the median family income was $49,501 and the United States median family income was $49,445, in 2010.

The district operates: Crestwood High School, Crestwood Middle School, Fairview Elementary School and Rice Elementary School.

== Extracurriculars ==
The district offers a variety of clubs and sports. Crestwood high school competes in the Pennsylvania Interscholastic Athletic Association under district 2. District sports range from class AA to class AAAAA.

The Crestwood field hockey team has won four state titles (1988, 1999, 2003, 2004), the second most in the state of Pennsylvania.

In the 2008-09 school year, the school received a district championship in girls' tennis, a state 3rd place in wrestling, a state 3rd place in the 1600m run, and a state 3rd place in the pole vault in track and field.
