= Mike Cabell =

American politician

Member of the Pennsylvania House of Representatives from the 117th district
- In office January 3, 2023 – November 30, 2024
- Preceded by: Karen Boback
- Succeeded by: Jamie Walsh

Personal details
- Born: April 12, 1985 (age 41)
- Education: Saint Joseph's University (BA)

Michael Cabell (born April 12, 1985) is an American politician who served as a member of the Pennsylvania House of Representatives for the 117th district from 2023 to 2024.

== Education ==
Cabell attended Bishop Hafey High School and earned a Bachelor of Arts degree in political science from Saint Joseph's University in 2011.

== Career ==
From 2009 to 2016, Cabell worked as the COO and CEO of Abbey Road Control, a flagging and traffic control company. From 2016 to 2021, he operated the Silver Pines Treatment Center in Schuylkill County, Pennsylvania. He later co-founded and served on the board of Civiq Health. Cabell was elected to the Pennsylvania House of Representatives in November 2022. Cabell was defeated in 2024 by primary challenger Jamie Walsh. The vote margin between the two ranged between three and five votes in Walsh's favor as the county election board tallied or rejected mail-in votes. Although the results remained unofficial, Walsh held his lead into July after the board tallied un-opened provisional ballots. Both Cabell and Walsh launched court challenges to swing the results in their favor, but it was Walsh who ultimately held a four-vote lead after all challenges were settled. Cabell conceded the race on September 23, the day the election results were certified.
