= Jamie Walsh (politician) =

American politician

Member of the Pennsylvania House of Representatives from the 117th district
- Incumbent
- Assumed office January 7, 2025
- Preceded by: Mike Cabell

Personal details
- Born: James Patrick Walsh c. 1975 Pennsylvania
- Party: Republican
- Committees: Children & Youth, Health, Housing and Community Development, State Government
- Website: https://www.repwalsh.com/

James Patrick Walsh (born c. 1975) is an American politician who is the current State Representative for the 117th district in the Pennsylvania House of Representatives. A Republican, he assumed office in 2025.

== Early life ==
Walsh grew up in Luzerne County, Pennsylvania. He later resided and graduated high school in Alaska where his father was a pipeline worker after divorcing Walsh's mother.

== Business career ==
After attending college, Walsh was a salesman with a home remodeling company. He then joined Comfort Co., a company that supplied wheelchair cushions. Walsh would become vice president of sales at Comfort Co., overseeing domestic and international distributions. After "a short bout with cancer" Walsh left the company and resettled in Luzerne County. He started Homeboys Seamless Gutters, a gutter installation business based in Sweet Valley, with his brother.

== Political activities ==
Walsh was co-founder and president of Citizens Advisory of Pennsylvania, a parental rights group that fought against mask mandates in schools during the COVID-19 pandemic. During the pandemic, Walsh began regularly attending board meetings of the Lake-Lehman School District where his children are enrolled. He advocated that Lake-Lehman end contact tracing after his son was kept home from school because of it. Walsh also labeled contract tracing and mask mandates an "unconstitutional mandate from the Pennsylvania Department of Health." In October 2021, Walsh organized a 250-person “Essential Liberties Rally” held at Lake-Lehman's football stadium to protest the district's mask mandate. The following year, Walsh filed a lawsuit alleging the district violated Pennsylvania's Sunshine Act by failing to justify closed door meetings and not making documents available in advance of meetings. Walsh claimed a document not made public by the district included critical race theory in the district's curriculum, although this claim was not included in his suit. The suit was settled in 2024 with the district denying any wrongdoing and paying Walsh's legal fees.

After polling places in Luzerne County ran out of paper ballots during the 2022 election, Walsh criticized the county election board over the matter and was part of a group of citizens who testified before a U.S. Congressional committee about the incident.

In 2024, Walsh resigned from Citizens Advisory to challenge incumbent State Representative Mike Cabell in the Republican primary election to represent the 117th district in the Pennsylvania House of Representatives. Walsh defeated Cabell in the election, but wasn't officially declared the winner until five months after the primary due to litigation over provisional ballots. The final vote count had Walsh defeating Cabell by four votes. He faced no opposition in the general election.

Prior to the 2024 election, filed a lawsuit against Luzerne County, alleging that its processing and distribution of mail-in ballots was unlawful. Walsh said he was contacted by 20 voters who said that they did not receive their mail-in ballots by four days before the election. Because of the short timespan before election day, Walsh said the voters would not have enough time to mail their ballots and would instead be physically required to go to their polling place or one of two ballot drop boxes in the county. The case was taken to federal court due to claims of constitutional rights violations and continued after the election passed. A judge dismissed the suit in April 2025, finding that Walsh lacked standing because “election practices could not possibly have caused him any injury as an unopposed and successful candidate for office.” The case cost the county $104,000 in legal fees, something County Manager Romilda Crocamo demanded Walsh repay for filing a "frivolous" lawsuit. Walsh did not pay and was subsequently banned by Butler Township supervisors from hosting public events in buildings owned by the township for this reason.

== Political positions ==
=== Data centers ===
Walsh initially supported the construction of a data center in Salem Township in March 2025, but since come out in opposition their construction. He believes such proposals are not being done with the consideration of community residents. In October 2025, he hosted a town hall in Sugarloaf Township arguing against the proposed construction of a data center and a high-voltage power line to power the facility. Other speakers at the event said the data center and the power line would negatively impact property values and raise electricity rates. Walsh said the construction proposition was being done under a "cloak of secrecy" and would be "destroying people’s lives." He also encouraged attendees to contact public officials and voice opposition. Walsh has also pushed for legislation to prevent residents from paying for rate increases caused by data centers. Walsh labeled another data center planned for construction on rural land a "planned invasion on us." In May 2026, he called for an 18-month moratorium on data center development.

=== Education ===
Walsh voted against legislation that reformulated funding and reduced the amount public school districts paid to cyber-charter schools. He stated that the funding cuts would be too severe for cyber-charters, although he supported "balancing" support for public and cyber-charter schools.

Walsh opposes using property taxes to fund schools and supports eliminating or lowering them via higher sales or income taxes. He also supports school vouchers for private schools.

=== Elections ===
Walsh opposes no-excuse mail-in voting and ballot drop boxes. He supports voter ID.

=== Legislative reform ===
Walsh supports limiting representatives to four terms and pledged to serve just as long after his election. He supports a ban on gifts to legislators.

=== Reproductive rights ===
Walsh believes that life begins at conception and opposes abortion, save for incidents where the mother's life is in jeopardy. He supports encouraging victims of rape and incest to place any resulting children up for adoption. Walsh supports legislation ensuring access to in vitro fertilization.

=== Taxes ===
Walsh opposes taxing natural gas drilling. He also opposes the "rain tax" on residents in the Susquehanna Watershed. He changed his vote from nay to yea on a bill exempting disabled veterans from property taxes, claiming his nay vote was incorrect.

== Electoral history ==
2024 Pennsylvania House of Representatives Republican primary election, District 117
Party	Candidate	Votes	%
Republican	Jamie Walsh	4,735	49.89
Republican	Mike Cabell (incumbent)	4,731	49.84
Write-in		13	0.14
Total votes		9,492	100.00

2024 Pennsylvania House of Representatives election, District 117
Party	Candidate	Votes	%
Republican	Jamie Walsh	28,176	94.43
Write-in		1,661	5.57
Total votes		29,837	100.00
