= Stanley Meholchick =

American politician

Member of the Pennsylvania House of Representatives from the 117th district
- In office 1969–1972
- Preceded by: District created
- Succeeded by: George Hasay

Member of the Pennsylvania House of Representatives from the Luzerne County district
- In office 1955–1968

Personal details
- Born: January 1, 1917 Ashley, Pennsylvania
- Died: August 21, 1998 (aged 81) Ashley, Pennsylvania
- Party: Democratic

Stanley A. Meholchick (January 1, 1917 – August 21, 1998) was a Democratic member of the Pennsylvania House of Representatives.
