= George Hasay =

American politician (1948–2021)

George C. Hasay

Member of the Pennsylvania House of Representatives from the 117th district
- In office January 1, 1973 – November 30, 2006
- Preceded by: Stanley Meholchick
- Succeeded by: Karen Boback

Personal details
- Born: February 7, 1948 Nanticoke, Pennsylvania
- Died: February 8, 2021 (aged 73) Sweet Valley, Pennsylvania
- Party: Republican
- Spouse: Nancy
- Occupation: Legislator

George C. Hasay (February 7, 1948 – February 8, 2021) was an American politician who was a Republican member of the Pennsylvania House of Representatives.

He was a 1966 graduate of Northwest Area High School. He earned a degree from Wilkes-Barre Business College in 1968 and attended Husson College in 1971.

Hasay was first elected to represent the 117th legislative district in the Pennsylvania House of Representatives in 1972. He retired prior to the 2006 election.

Hasay died on February 8, 2021, after a brief illness, one day after his 73rd birthday.
