= Penn Lake Park, Pennsylvania =

Borough in Pennsylvania, US

- Borough
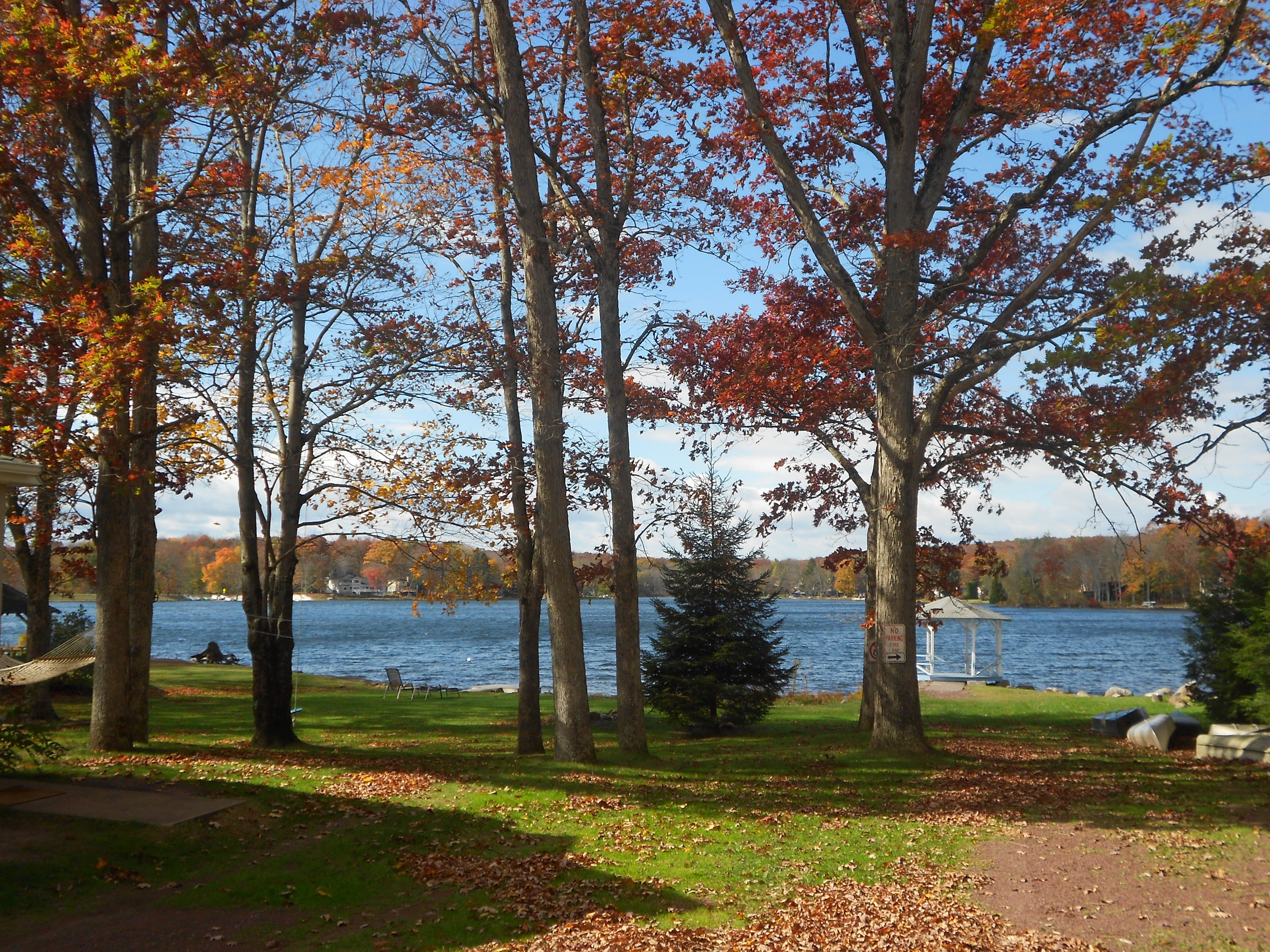
- Nickname: Penn Lake
- Location of Penn Lake Park in Luzerne County, Pennsylvania.

- Location within Pennsylvania Location within the United States
- Coordinates: 41°06′54″N 75°46′12″W
- Country: United States
- State: Pennsylvania
- County: Luzerne
- Settled: 1938
- Incorporated: 1976

Government
  - Type: Borough Council

Area
  - Total: 1.66 sq mi (4.31 km^{2})
  - Land: 1.58 sq mi (4.10 km^{2})
  - Water: 0.081 sq mi (0.21 km^{2})
- Elevation: 1,400 ft (430 m)

Population (2020)
  - Total: 360
  - Density: 227.5/sq mi (87.83/km^{2})
- Time zone: UTC-5 (Eastern (EST))
  - Summer (DST): UTC-4 (EDT)
- ZIP code: 18661
- Area code(s): 570
- FIPS code: 42-59054
- Website: pennlakeborough.com

Penn Lake Park is a borough in Luzerne County, Pennsylvania, United States. The population was 359 at the 2020 census.

== History ==
The community was founded in 1938, after ice salesman Albert Lewis used the lake to chip out his product. In 1946, Harry and Mary Goeringer bought the lake — and the 800 acres around it — from Lewis. They built a house by the lake; they later divided the rest of the land into parcels. It became a borough in 1976, when Penn Lake Park applied for a state grant because the lake's dam needed a major repair.

== Geography ==
Penn Lake Park is located at 41°06′54″N 75°46′12″W. According to the United States Census Bureau, the borough has a total area of 1.6 square miles (4.2 km^{2}), of which 1.5 square miles (4.0 km^{2}) is land and 0.08 square miles (0.2 km^{2}), or 5.05%, is water. It contains part of the census-designated place of Mountain Top.

Penn Lake Park is located 10 miles (16 km) south of Wilkes-Barre.

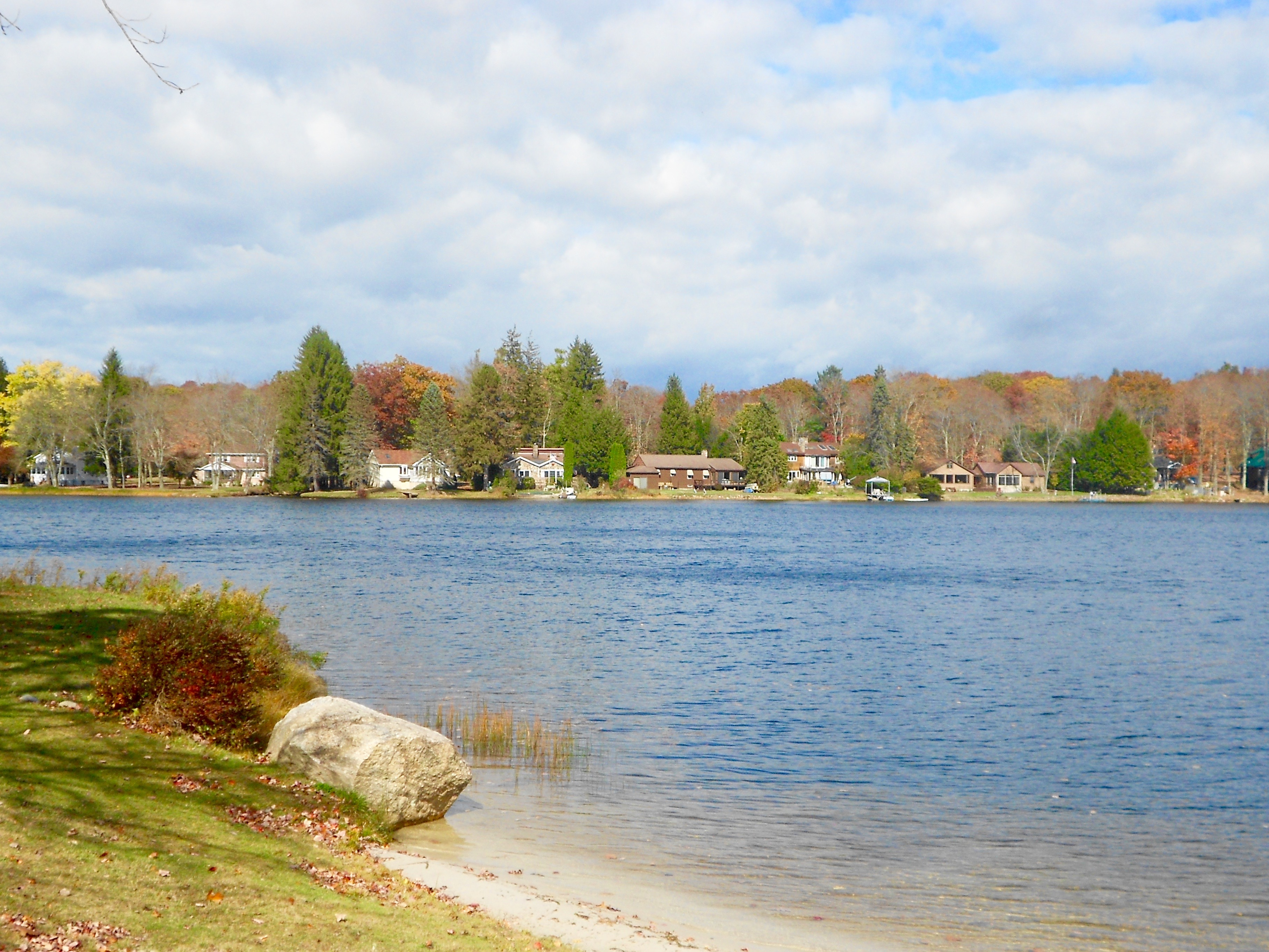
Penn Lake Park

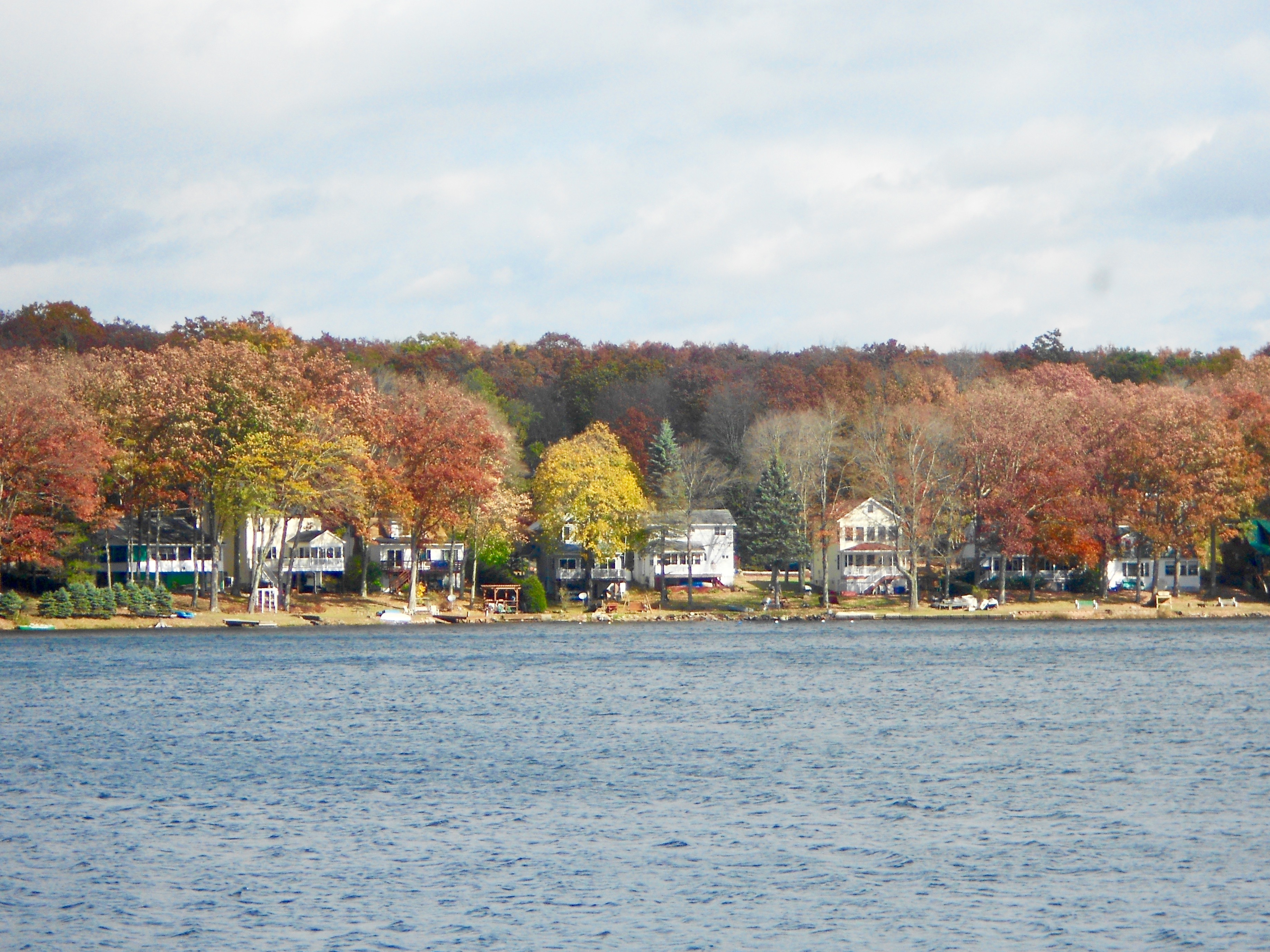
Penn Lake Park

== Demographics ==
Historical population
Census	Pop.	Note	%±
1980	217		—
1990	242		11.5%
2000	269		11.2%
2010	308		14.5%
2020	360		16.9%
2021 (est.)	365	▲	1.4%

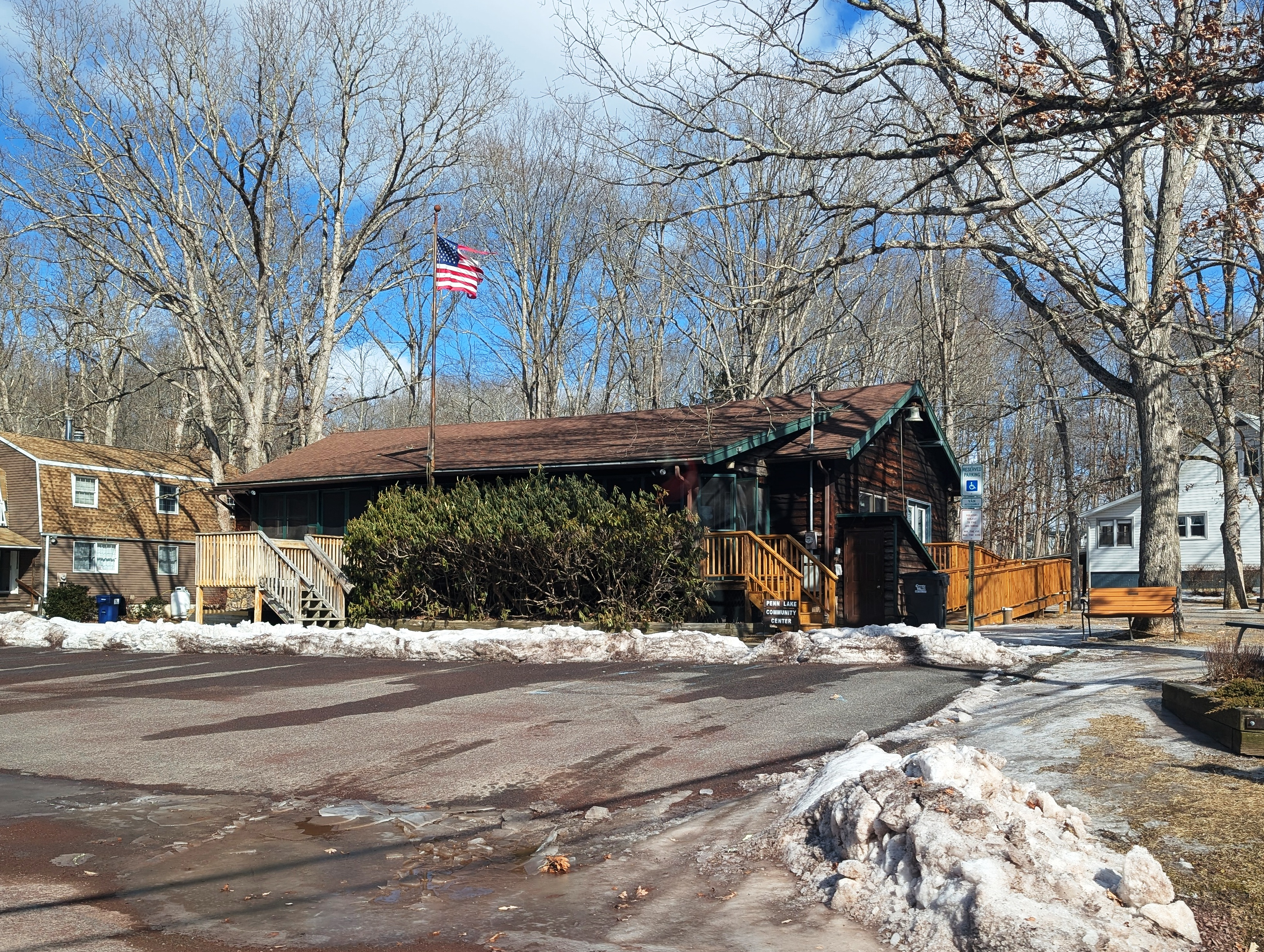
Borough Hall and Community Center

As of the census of 2000, there were 269 people, 118 households, and 84 families residing in the borough. The population density was 137.5 inhabitants per square mile (53.1/km^{2}). There were 222 housing units at an average density of 113.5 per square mile (43.8/km^{2}). The racial makeup of the borough was 98.88% White, 1.12% from other races. Hispanic or Latino of any race were 0.74% of the population.

There were 118 households, out of which 23.7% had children under the age of 18 living with them, 63.6% were married couples living together, 5.1% had a female householder with no husband present, and 28.0% were non-families. 22.0% of all households were made up of individuals, and 9.3% had someone living alone who was 65 years of age or older. The average household size was 2.28 and the average family size was 2.67.

In the borough the population was spread out, with 19.0% under the age of 18, 5.6% from 18 to 24, 26.4% from 25 to 44, 31.2% from 45 to 64, and 17.8% who were 65 years of age or older. The median age was 45 years. For every 100 females there were 105.3 males. For every 100 females age 18 and over, there were 98.2 males.

The median income for a household in the borough was $45,139, and the median income for a family was $50,000. Males had a median income of $29,018 versus $26,000 for females. The per capita income for the borough was $20,437. About 5.7% of families and 4.4% of the population were below the poverty line, including none of those under the age of eighteen and 20.8% of those sixty five or over.

== Education ==
The school district is the Crestwood School District.
