= Dorrance Township, Pennsylvania =

Township in Pennsylvania, US

Coordinates: 41°08′00″N 75°58′59″W

- Township
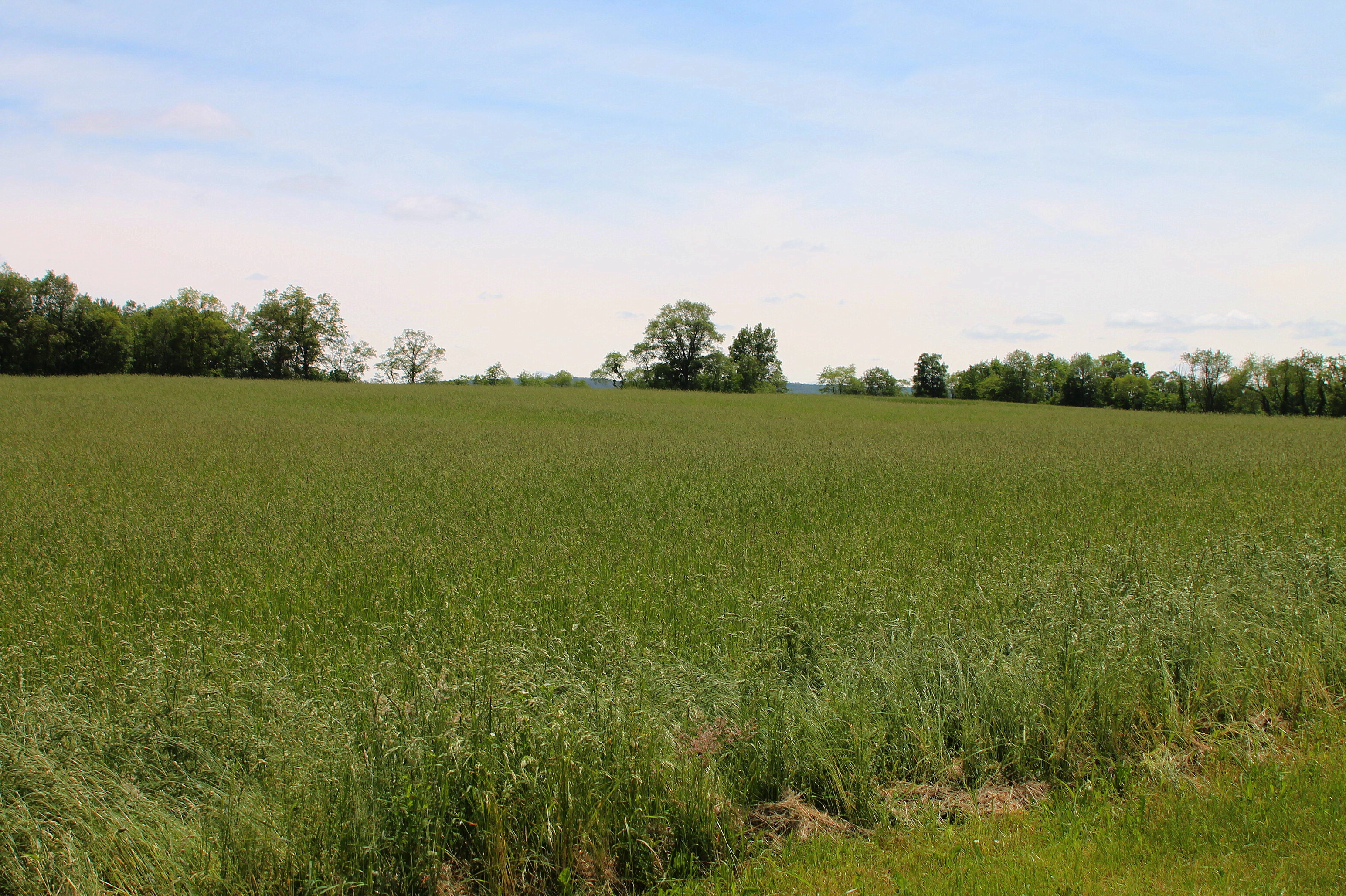
- Field in Dorrance Township on Saint Marys Road

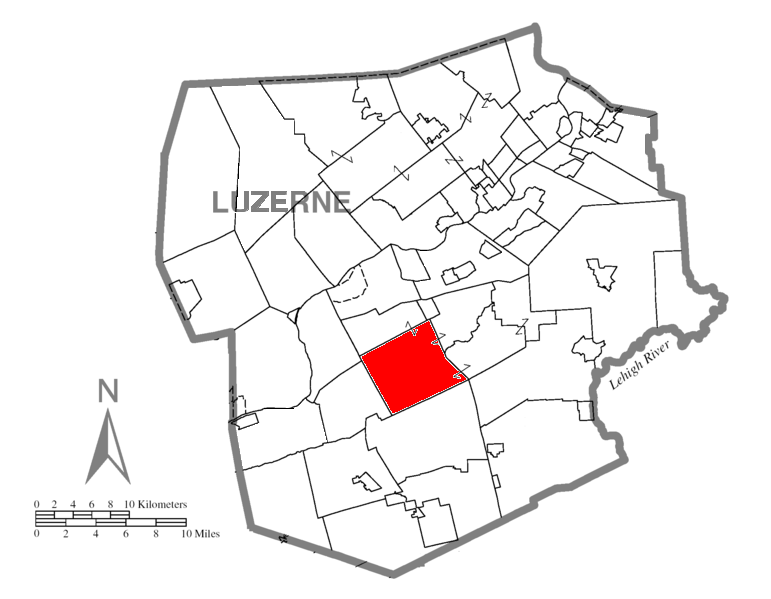
- Map of Luzerne County highlighting Dorrance Township

- Map of Pennsylvania highlighting Luzerne County
- Country: United States
- State: Pennsylvania
- County: Luzerne

Area
  - Total: 24.37 sq mi (63.11 km^{2})
  - Land: 24.20 sq mi (62.67 km^{2})
  - Water: 0.17 sq mi (0.43 km^{2})

Population (2020)
  - Total: 2,077 ▼
  - Estimate (2021): 2,072
  - Density: 91.5/sq mi (35.33/km^{2})
- Time zone: UTC-5 (Eastern (EST))
  - Summer (DST): UTC-4 (EDT)
- FIPS code: 42-079-19616
- Website: dorrancetwp.com

Dorrance Township is a township in Luzerne County, Pennsylvania, United States. The population was 2,077 at the 2020 census.

== History ==
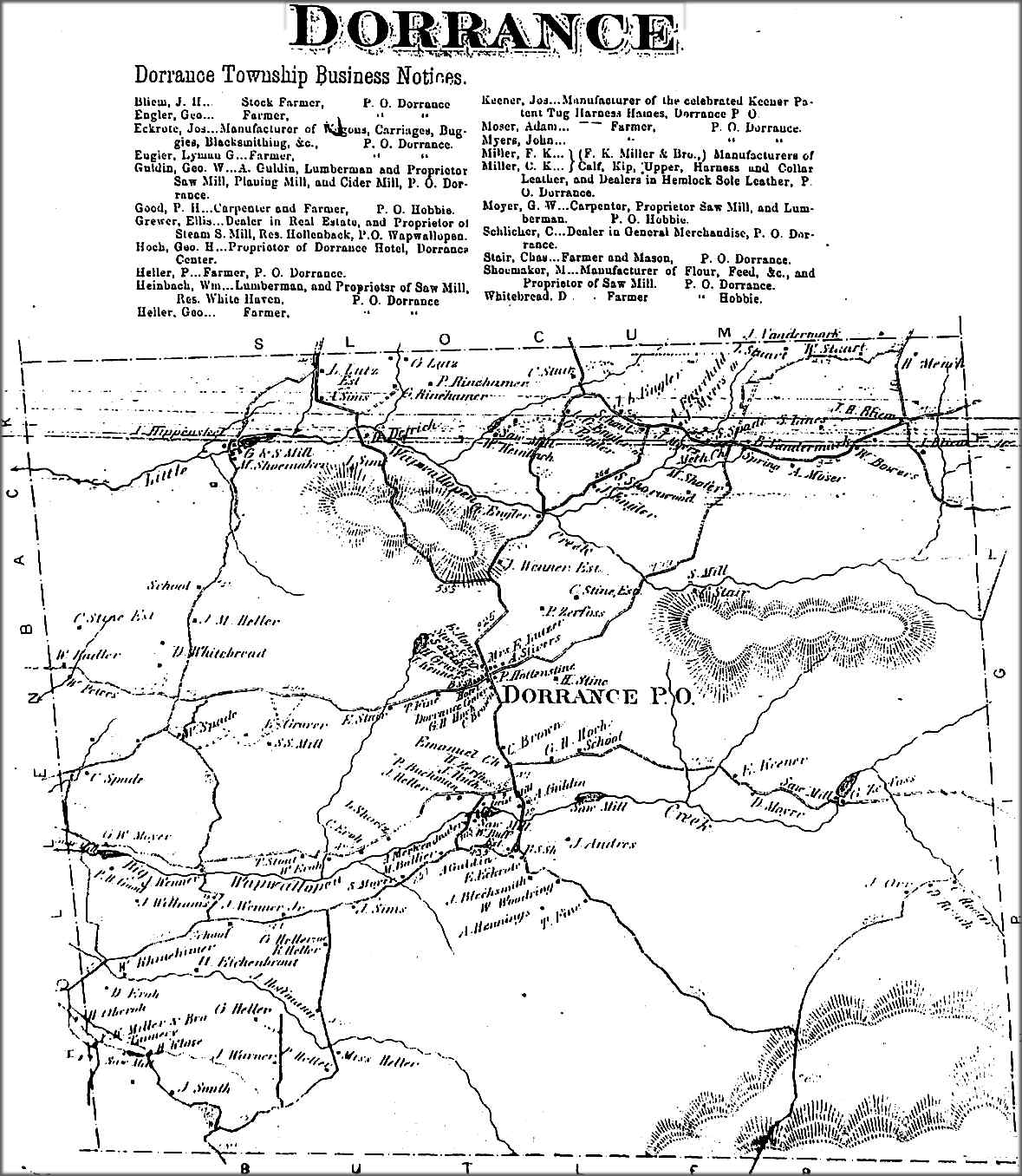
An old map of Dorrance

=== Founding ===
It's believed that the township's first white settlers were hunters and fishermen. They were soon followed by lumberjacks. The community bears the name of Col. George Dorrance, who was killed in the Battle of Wyoming on July 3, 1778. Following the battle, settlers began to move into what is now Dorrance Township.

The township was officially formed in 1840, when it broke away from Newport Township. By 1860, over five hundred people lived within the township. In 1865, the community had several sawmills, gristmills, and at least one tavern.

Dorrance Village is the only hamlet in the township; it is located near the center of the community. It became a major intersection in the township. A schoolhouse, which also acted as a meeting house, was constructed near the crossroads.

== Geography ==
According to the United States Census Bureau, the township has a total area of 24.4 square miles (63.1 km^{2}), of which 24.2 square miles (62.7 km^{2}) is land and 0.15 square miles (0.4 km^{2}), or 0.68%, is water. Dorrance Township is part of the Mountain Top region of Luzerne County. The township, which consists mostly of farmland and forests, is located within a valley (between Penobscot Mountain—to the north—and Nescopeck Mountain—to the south). Several lakes and streams (e.g., Little Wapwallopen Creek and Big Wapwallopen Creek) are scattered throughout the township. Dorrance Village is the only hamlet in the township; it is centrally located. I-81 and PA 309 run through the eastern section of Dorrance Township.

== Demographics ==
Historical population
Census	Pop.	Note	%±
2000	2,109		—
2010	2,188		3.7%
2020	2,077		−5.1%
2021 (est.)	2,072		−0.2%
U.S. Decennial Census

As of the census of 2000, there were 2,109 people, 775 households, and 626 families residing in the township. The population density was 87.4 inhabitants per square mile (33.7/km^{2}). There were 816 housing units at an average density of 33.8 per square mile (13.1/km^{2}). The racial makeup of the township was 99.24% White, 0.05% African American, 0.09% Asian, and 0.62% from two or more races. Hispanic or Latino of any race were 0.28% of the population.

There were 775 households, out of which 37.7% had children under the age of 18 living with them, 69.5% were married couples living together, 8.8% had a female householder with no husband present, and 19.1% were non-families. 17.0% of all households were made up of individuals, and 6.6% had someone living alone who was 65 years of age or older. The average household size was 2.72 and the average family size was 3.05.

In the township the population was spread out, with 25.9% under the age of 18, 6.3% from 18 to 24, 29.8% from 25 to 44, 26.0% from 45 to 64, and 12.0% who were 65 years of age or older. The median age was 38 years. For every 100 females, there were 101.0 males. For every 100 females age 18 and over, there were 96.2 males.

The median income for a household in the township was $44,545, and the median income for a family was $49,583. Males had a median income of $34,194 versus $26,364 for females. The per capita income for the township was $19,519. About 2.4% of families and 3.4% of the population were below the poverty line, including 4.0% of those under age 18 and 4.4% of those age 65 or over.

== Education ==
Dorrance Township is part of Crestwood School District.
