= Wapwallopen (disambiguation) =

Wapwallopen may refer to the following in the U.S. state of Pennsylvania:

- Wapwallopen, Pennsylvania, an unincorporated community in Luzerne County
- Big Wapwallopen Creek, also known simply as Wapwallopen Creek, a tributary of the Susquehanna River
- Little Wapwallopen Creek, a tributary of the Susquehanna River in Luzerne County
