= Pond Creek (Little Wapwallopen Creek tributary) =

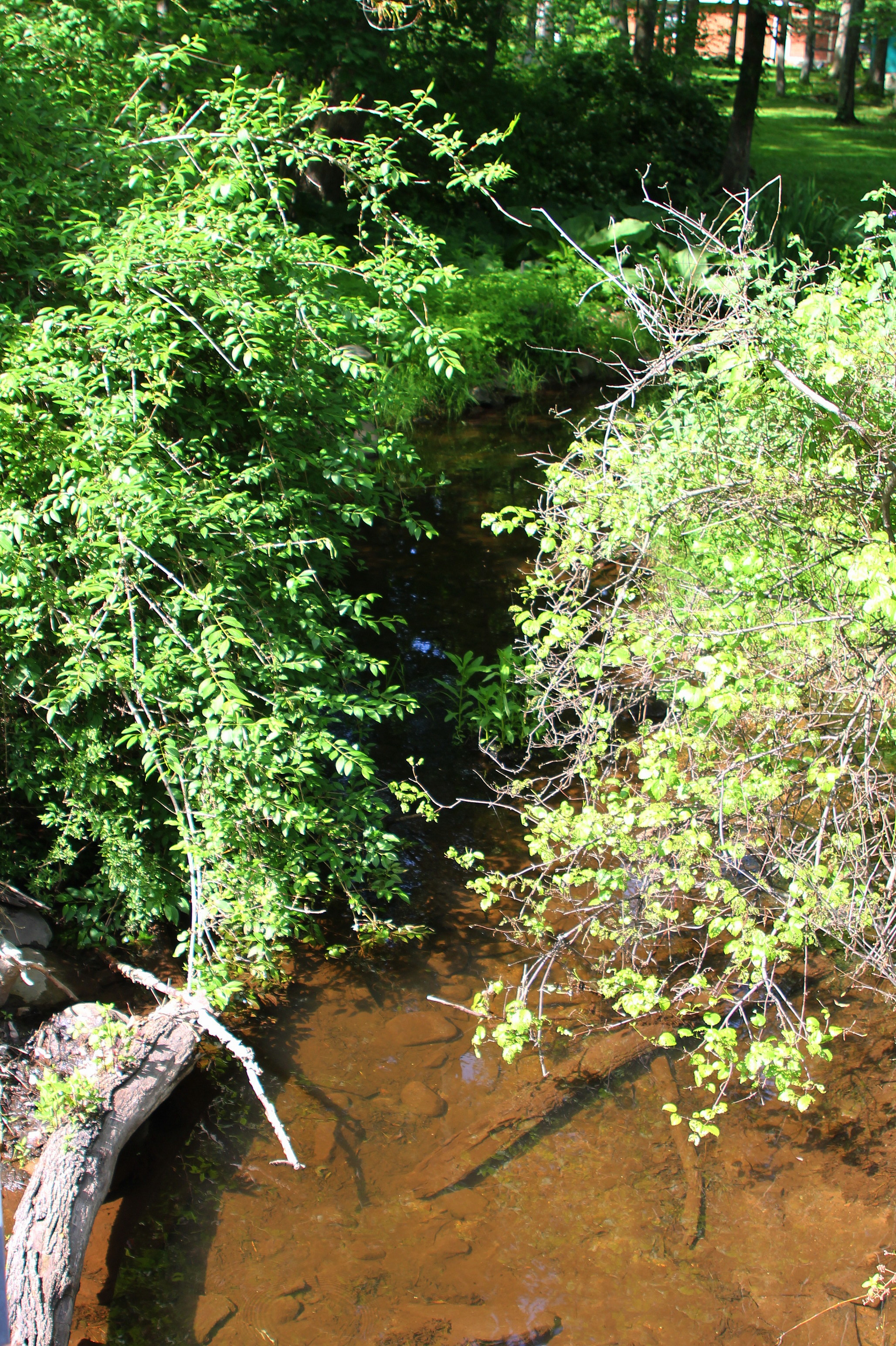
- Pond Creek at Pond Hill Mountain Road

Physical characteristics
- Source
  - location: southern side of Penobscot Mountain near the border between Slocum Township, Pennsylvania and Newport Township, Pennsylvania
  - elevation: between 1,000 and 1,020 feet (300 and 310 m)
- Mouth
  - location: Little Wapwallopen Creek in Conyngham Township, Luzerne County, Pennsylvania
  - coordinates: 41°05′57″N 76°06′22″W
  - elevation: 522 ft (159 m)
- Length: 6.4 mi (10.3 km)
- Basin size: 9.69 mi^{2} (25.1 km^{2})

Basin features
- Progression: Little Wapwallopen Creek → Susquehanna River → Chesapeake Bay
- Tributaries
  - left: two unnamed tributaries
  - right: one unnamed tributary

Pond Creek (also known as Long Pond Creek) is a tributary of Little Wapwallopen Creek in Luzerne County, Pennsylvania, in the United States. It is approximately 6.4 miles (10.3 km) long and flows through Slocum Township and Conyngham Township. The watershed of the creek has an area of 9.69 square miles (25.1 km^{2}) and is part of the lower North Branch Susquehanna River drainage basin. A bridge was built over the creek in 1956. In the early 1900s, the Glen Brook Water Company planned to construct a dam on the creek. The surficial geology in the vicinity of Pond Creek includes Wisconsinan Till, alluvium, boulder alluvium, alluvial fan, and bedrock consisting of sandstone and shale, as well as some patches of wetland.

== Course ==
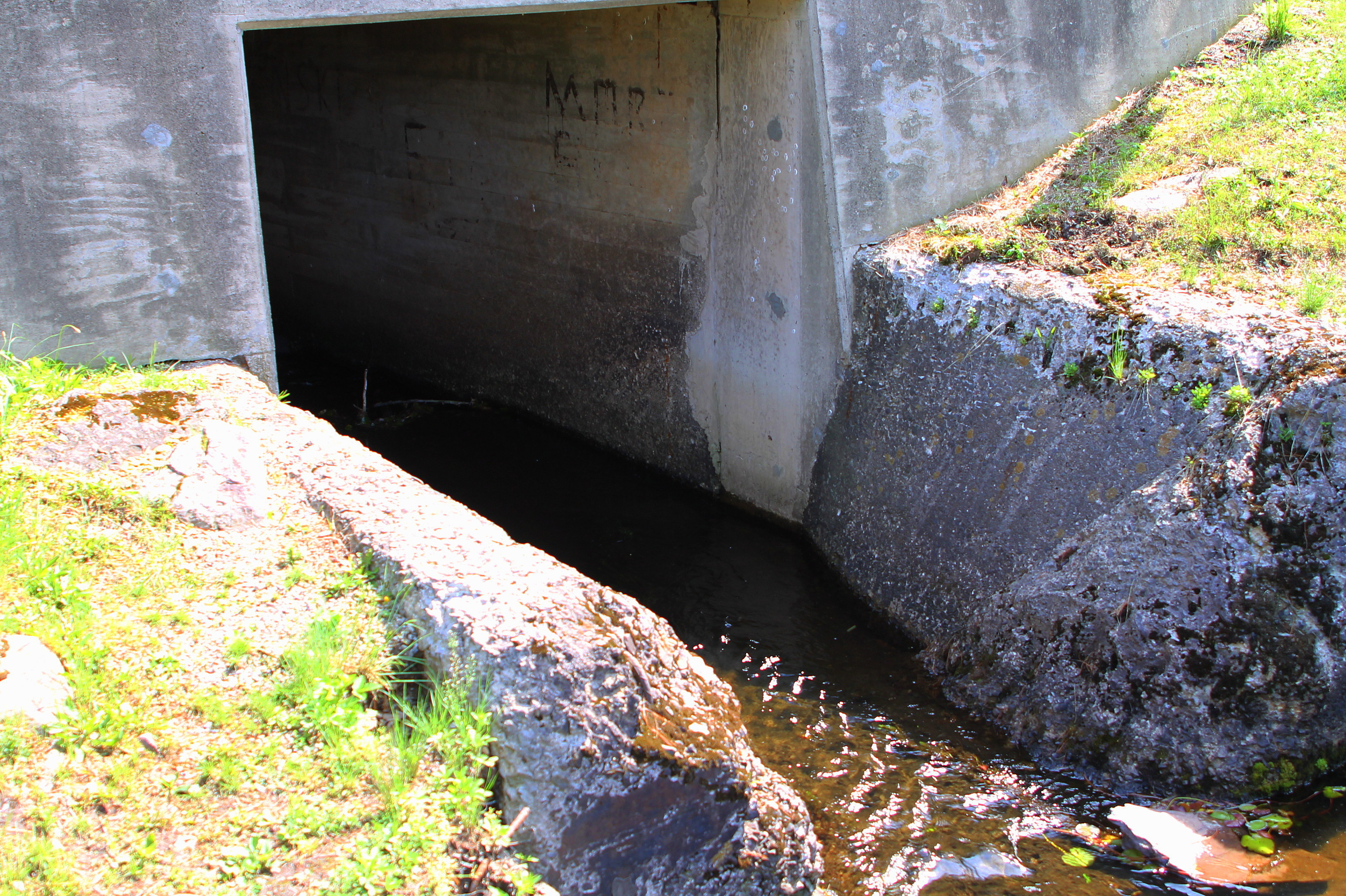
Pond Creek looking downstream below Lily Lake as it crosses under a road

Pond Creek begins on the southern side of Penobscot Mountain, a few hundred feet from the border between Slocum Township and Newport Township. It flows west-southwest for several tenths of a mile before passing through Cranberry Pond and turning northwest. The creek then turns west-southwest and passes through Lily Lake, where it exits Slocum Township and enters Conyngham Township. At the southern edge of the lake, it turns south for a short distance before turning southwest for several tenths of a mile and entering a valley. The creek then turns south for several tenths of a mile and receives an unnamed tributary from the left before meandering southwest. After several tenths of a mile, it turns west and receives an unnamed tributary from the right before turning due south for several tenths of a mile as its valley becomes much deeper. The creek then receives another unnamed tributary from the left and abruptly turns west-southwest. After a few tenths of a mile, it turns sharply to the east for a few tenths of a mile and leaves its valley. The creek then turns west-southwest and reaches its confluence with Little Wapwallopen Creek.

Pond Creek joins Little Wapwallopen Creek 1.52 miles (2.45 km) upstream of its mouth.

=== Tributaries ===
Pond Creek has no officially named tributaries. However, it does have several unnamed tributaries. The first tributary is approximately 3 miles (4.8 km) long, the second is approximately 0.4 miles (0.64 km) long, and the third is approximately 0.8 miles (1.3 km) long. One tributary of the creek was referred to as Black Creek in a 1908 report by the Pennsylvania Department of Health.

== Geography and geology ==
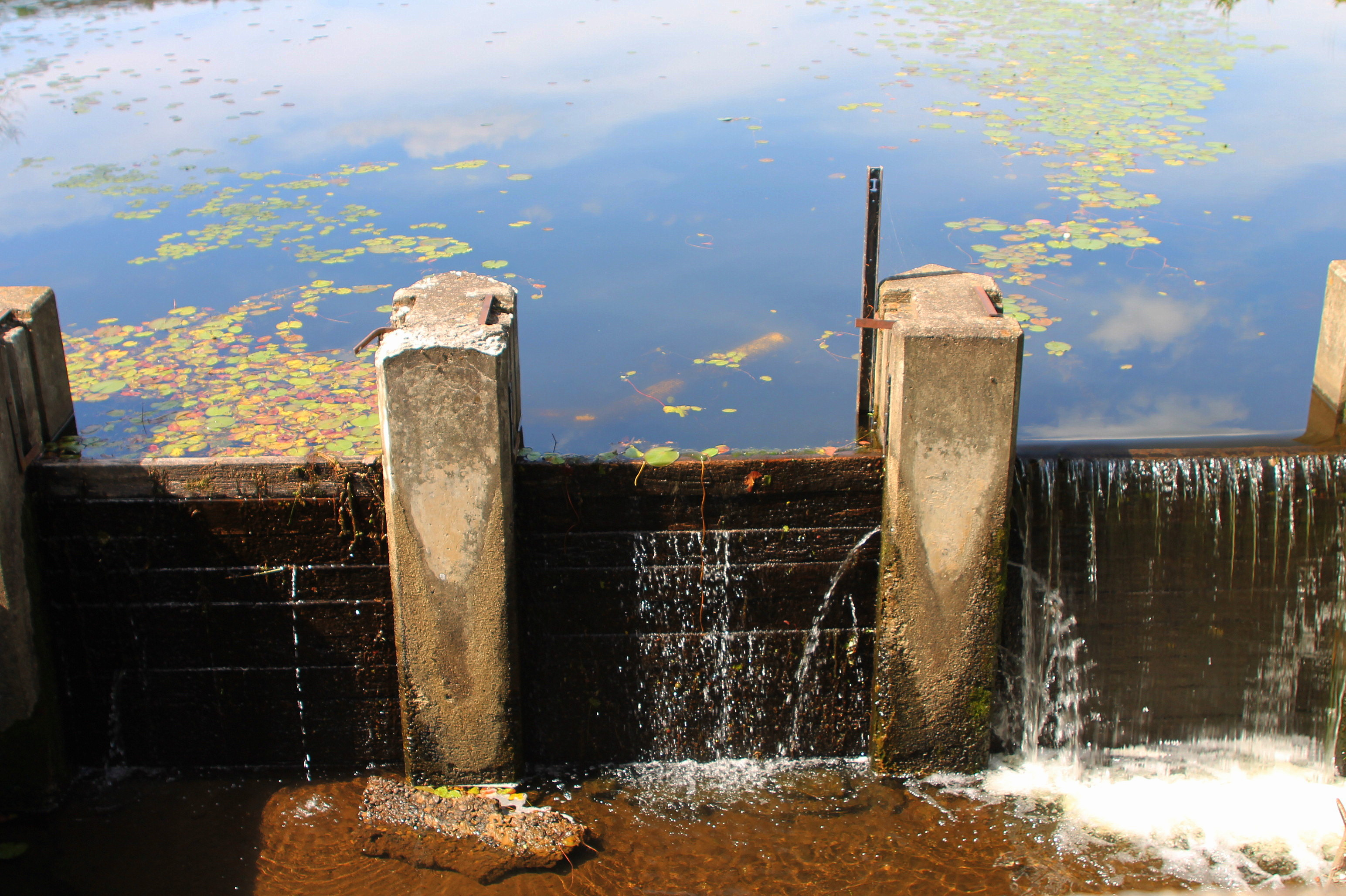
Lily Lake dam on Pond Creek

The elevation near the mouth of Pond Creek is 522 feet (159 m) above sea level. The elevation of the creek's source is between 1,000 and 1,020 feet (300 and 310 m) above sea level.

Pond Creek is in the vicinity of the Wyoming mountains, flowing along their south side. The creek flows through a gorge in its lower reaches. In the gorge, the creek flows through a ledge of tough rocks with few cracks or fissures.

Most of the upper reaches of the watershed of Pond Creek are on a glacial or resedimented till known as Wisconsinan Till. However, outcroppings of bedrock consisting of sandstone and shale occur on Penobscot Mountain. Small patches of alluvium and boulder alluvium occur along the creek downstream of Lily Lake. In its lower reaches, the valley of the creek mostly contains alluvium and Wisconsinan Ice-Contact Stratified Drift. Wisconsinan Ice-Contact Stratified Drift consists of stratified sand and gravel, as well as some boulders. Bedrock consisting of sandstone and shale surrounds the valley and an alluvial fan occurs at its mouth.

== Watershed ==
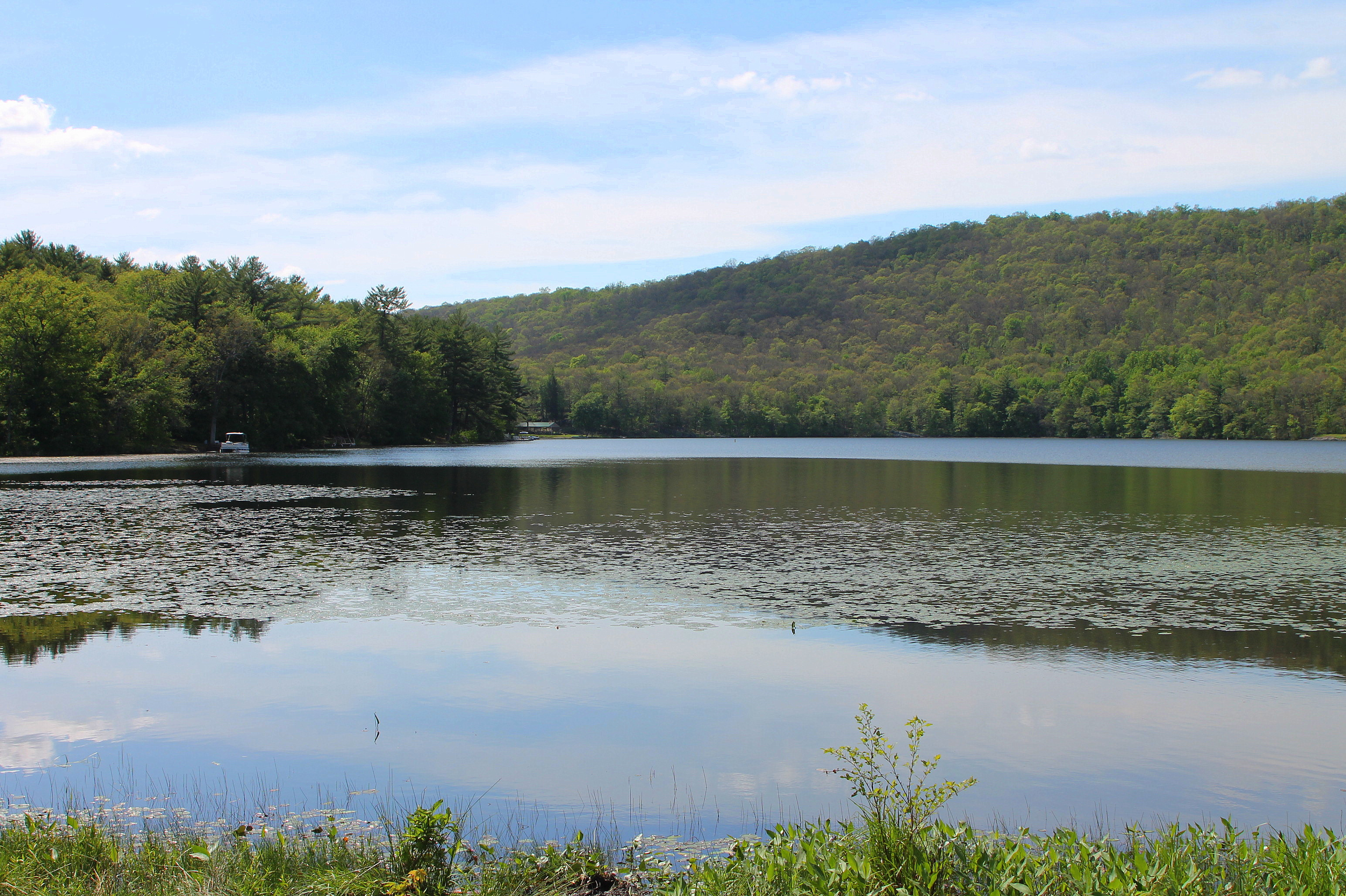
Lily Lake

The watershed of Pond Creek has an area of 9.69 square miles (25.1 km^{2}). The mouth of the creek is in the United States Geological Survey quadrangle of Sybertsville. However, its source is in the quadrangle of Nanticoke. The watershed of the creek is part of the Lower North Branch Susquehanna drainage basin. Pond Creek flows generally in a westward direction.

A pond known as Mud Pond is located in the watershed of Pond Creek. It is on a tributary of Pond Creek, not on the main stem itself. There are patches of wetland at the headwaters of the creek.

Wild trout naturally reproduce in Pond Creek.

== History ==
Pond Creek was entered into the Geographic Names Information System on August 2, 1979. Its identifier in the Geographic Names Information System is 1184234.

A prestressed box beam bridge was built over Pond Creek in 1956. The bridge is located 1 mile (1.6 km) east of State Route 3006 and carries T-466/Cemetery Road. Two bridges were built over tributaries of the creek in 1956 and 1966.

In the early 1900s, the Glen Brook Water Company had plans to construct a masonry dam on Pond Creek. The dam was planned to be 65 feet (20 m) high and the resulting reservoir (known as the Pond Creek Reservoir) was intended to have an area of 16 acres and a volume of 125,000,000 gallons. The dam was to be situated 0.25 miles (0.40 km) upstream of the creek's mouth, in a gorge.

== See also ==
- Nuangola Outlet, next tributary of Little Wapwallopen Creek going upstream
- List of rivers of Pennsylvania
