= Nuangola Outlet =

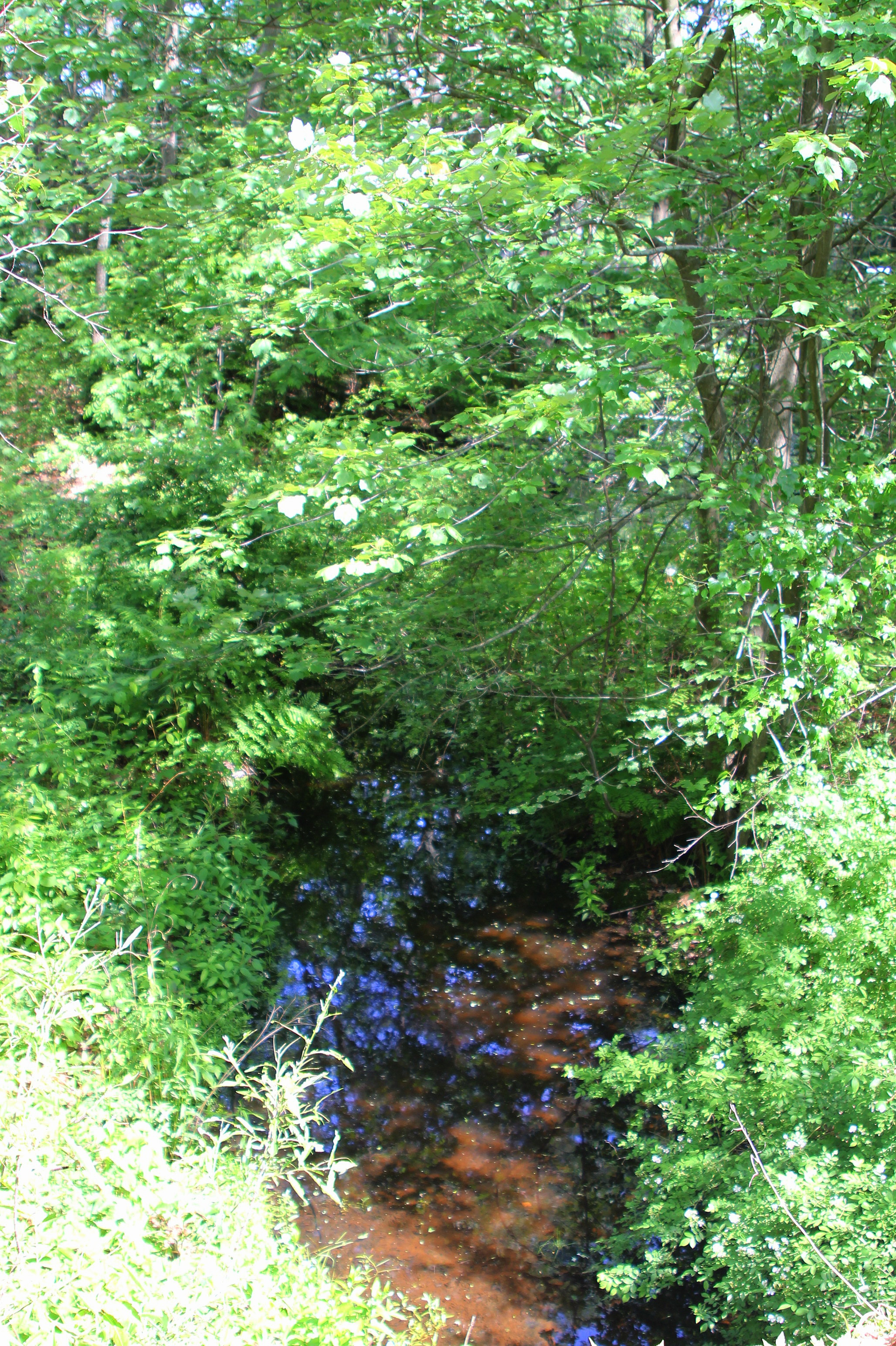
- Nuangola Outlet looking downstream

Physical characteristics
- Source
  - location: Nuangola Lake in Rice Township, Luzerne County, Pennsylvania
  - elevation: between 1,180 and 1,200 feet (360 and 370 m)
- Mouth
  - location: Little Wapwallopen Creek in Rice Township, Luzerne County, Pennsylvania
  - coordinates: 41°08′55″N 75°57′14″W
  - elevation: 1,056 ft (322 m)
- Length: 1.8 mi (2.9 km)
- Basin size: 2.35 sq mi (6.1 km^{2})

Basin features
- Progression: Little Wapwallopen Creek → Chesapeake Bay

Nuangola Outlet is a tributary of Little Wapwallopen Creek in Luzerne County, Pennsylvania, in the United States. It is approximately 1.8 miles (2.9 km) long and flows through Rice Township. The watershed of the stream has an area of 2.35 square miles (6.1 km^{2}). Wisconsinan Till and bedrock consisting of sandstone, shale, conglomerate, and coal occur in the watershed. There are also several lakes and patches of wetland. The stream was observed to have "excellent" water quality in the 1970s.

== Course ==
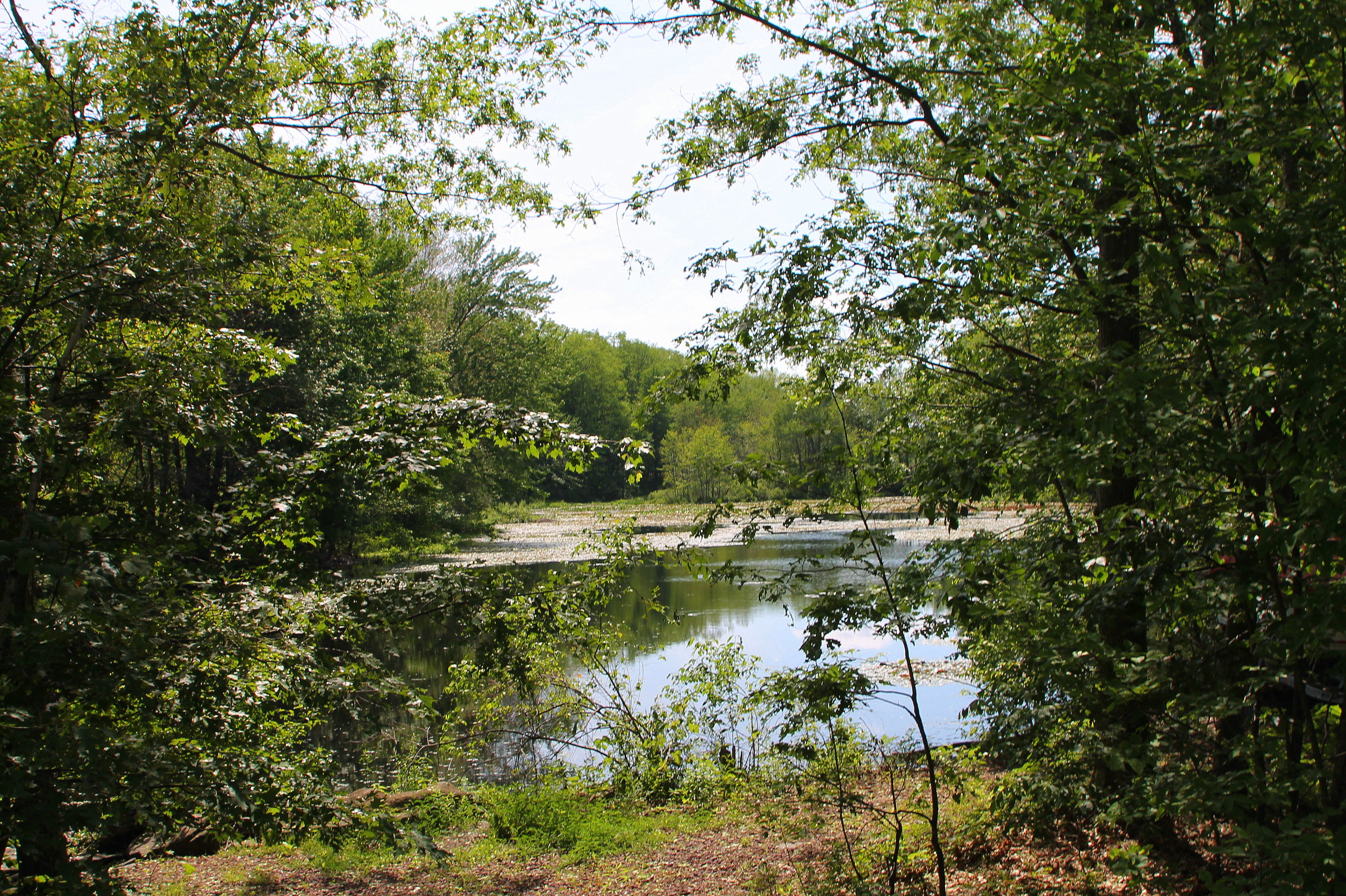
Nuangola Outlet looking upstream towards Nuangola Lake

Nuangola Outlet begins in Nuangola Lake in Rice Township, a few hundred feet east of the border between Rice Township and Nuangola. It flows east for a few tenths of a mile, passing through one lake and entering another lake. From the southern end of the second lake, the stream flows south and passes through two more small lakes after a few tenths of a mile. It then crosses Interstate 81 and turns southeast and then east. After a short distance, the stream reaches its confluence with Little Wapwallopen Creek.

Nuangola Outlet joins Little Wapwallopen Creek 14.55 miles (23.42 km) upstream of its mouth.

== Geography and geology ==
The elevation near the mouth of Nuangola Outlet is 1,056 feet (322 m) above sea level. The elevation near the stream's source is between 1,180 and 1,200 feet (360 and 370 m) above sea level.

Nuangola Outlet is situated just south of Penobscot Knob.

Most of the surficial geology in the vicinity of Nuangola Outlet consists of a glacial or resedimented till known as Wisconsinan Till. However, bedrock consisting of sandstone, conglomerate, shale, and coal also occurs near the stream, especially on Penobscot Mountain.

== Watershed ==
The watershed of Nuangola Outlet has an area of 2.35 square miles (6.1 km^{2}). The stream is entirely within the United States Geological Survey quadrangle of Wilkes-Barre West.

A wastewater treatment plant with a capacity of 87,500 gallons per day discharges into Little Wapwallopen Creek through Nuangola Outlet. The treatment plant is operated by Wilbar Realty and serves 176 homes in the Laurel Lake Village housing development.

There are a number of lakes in the watershed of Nuangola Outlet, one of which is Nuangola Lake. Nuangola Lake has an area of approximately 97 acres. There are also several wetlands in the watershed.

== History ==
Nuangola Outlet was entered into the Geographic Names Information System on August 2, 1979. Its identifier in the Geographic Names Information System is 1193052.

In the 1970s, Nuangola Outlet was observed to have "excellent" water quality.

== Biology ==
The trout populations of Nuangola Outlet have been reduced by more than 50 percent.

== See also ==
- Pond Creek (Little Wapwallopen Creek), next tributary of Little Wapwallopen Creek going downstream
- List of rivers of Pennsylvania
