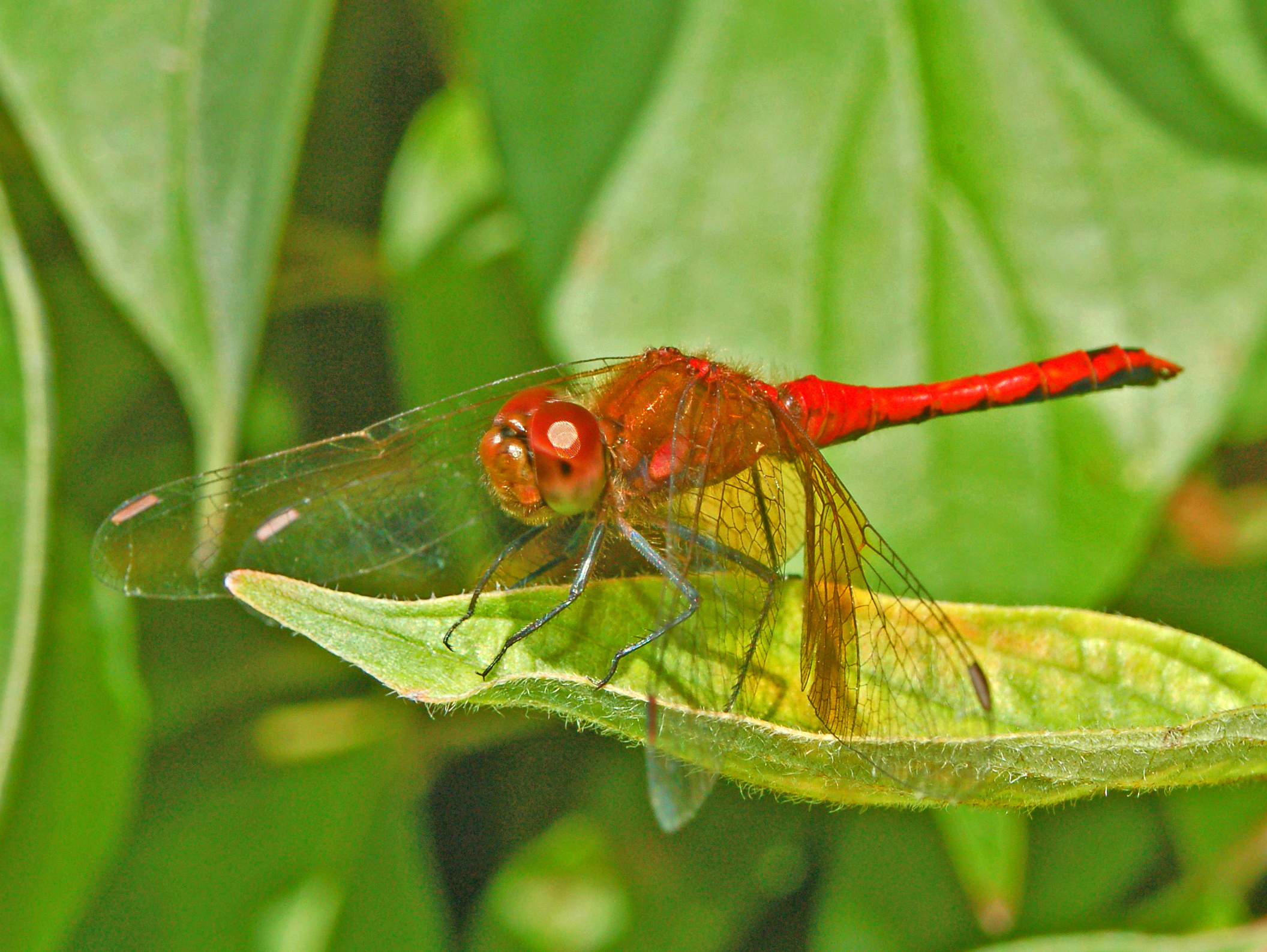

Conservation status
- Least Concern (IUCN 3.1)

Scientific classification
- Kingdom: Animalia
- Phylum: Arthropoda
- Class: Insecta
- Order: Odonata
- Infraorder: Anisoptera
- Family: Libellulidae
- Genus: Sympetrum
- Species: S. semicinctum

Binomial name
- Sympetrum semicinctum (Say, 1839)

Synonyms
- Libellula semicincta Say, 1840; Sympetrum californicum Walker, 1951; Sympetrum fasciatum Walker, 1951; Sympetrum occidentale Bartenev, 1915; Sympetrum occidentale californicum Walker, 1951; Sympetrum occidentale fasciatum Walker, 1951

= Band-winged meadowhawk =

Species of dragonfly

The band-winged meadowhawk (Sympetrum semicinctum) is a dragonfly of the genus Sympetrum belonging to the family Libellulidae.

== Taxonomy ==
Sympetrum semicinctum is closely related to, and may not be a distinct species from, the western meadowhawk (Sympetrum occidentale). Other geographical variants are S. californicum and S. fasciatum.

== Distribution ==
This species is native to Canada and Continental United States, from coast to coast. It is present in Canada (Alberta, British Columbia, Manitoba, New Brunswick, Nova Scotia, Ontario, Prince Edward I., Québec, Saskatchewan); United States (Alabama, Arizona, California, Colorado, Connecticut, Delaware, District of Columbia, Georgia, Idaho, Illinois, Indiana, Iowa, Kansas, Kentucky, Maine, Maryland, Massachusetts, Michigan, Minnesota, Missouri, Montana, Nebraska, Nevada, New Hampshire, New Jersey, New Mexico, New York, North Carolina, North Dakota, Ohio, Oklahoma, Oregon, Pennsylvania, Rhode Island, South Dakota, Tennessee, Texas, Utah, Vermont, Virginia, Washington, West Virginia, Wisconsin, Wyoming).

== Habitat ==
This dragonfly can be found perched on vegetation along the edges of meadows, in weedy ponds, marshes and lakes, also in the hills or mountains.

== Description ==
Sympetrum semicinctum can reach a length of 28–36 millimetres (1.1–1.4 in), with a wingspan of 45–55 millimetres (1.8–2.2 in). The male has a bright red abdomen with black markings on the lower sides and on the top of the segments 8 and 9, creating a U like pattern. The thorax is brownish red and the sides show three irregular black stripes. Face and eyes are dark red. The legs are black. The hind wings have a rusty patch at the base, covering one-third of the wings, while the front wings are almost completely transparent. Pterostigma is blackish red.

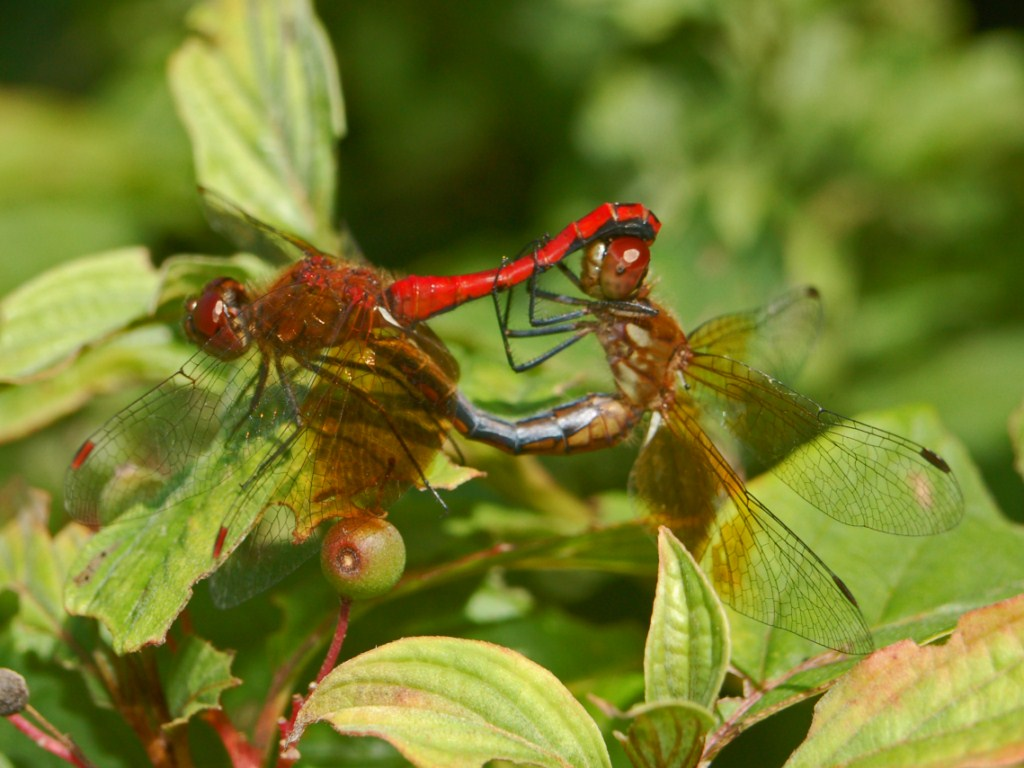
Sympetrum semicinctum, mating pair

The female is mainly greenish-yellowish or orange, with red over green on eyes and extended blackish markings on the abdomen. Mature females sometimes turn red like males, while immature males are yellow like females and slowly reach their red coloration.

== Biology and behavior ==
The flight period extends from April to mid October, but this dragonfly is more common in late summer.

Adults feed on soft-bodied flying insects. After mating females usually fly in tandem with males during oviposition, performed in flight by dipping the tip of the abdomen into the water. Larvae live in aquatic vegetation. They feed on many different aquatic insects (mosquito larvae, mayfly larvae, other fly larvae, small fish and tadpoles).
