= Rice Township, Pennsylvania =

Township in Pennsylvania, US

Coordinates: 41°10′00″N 75°55′59″W

- Township
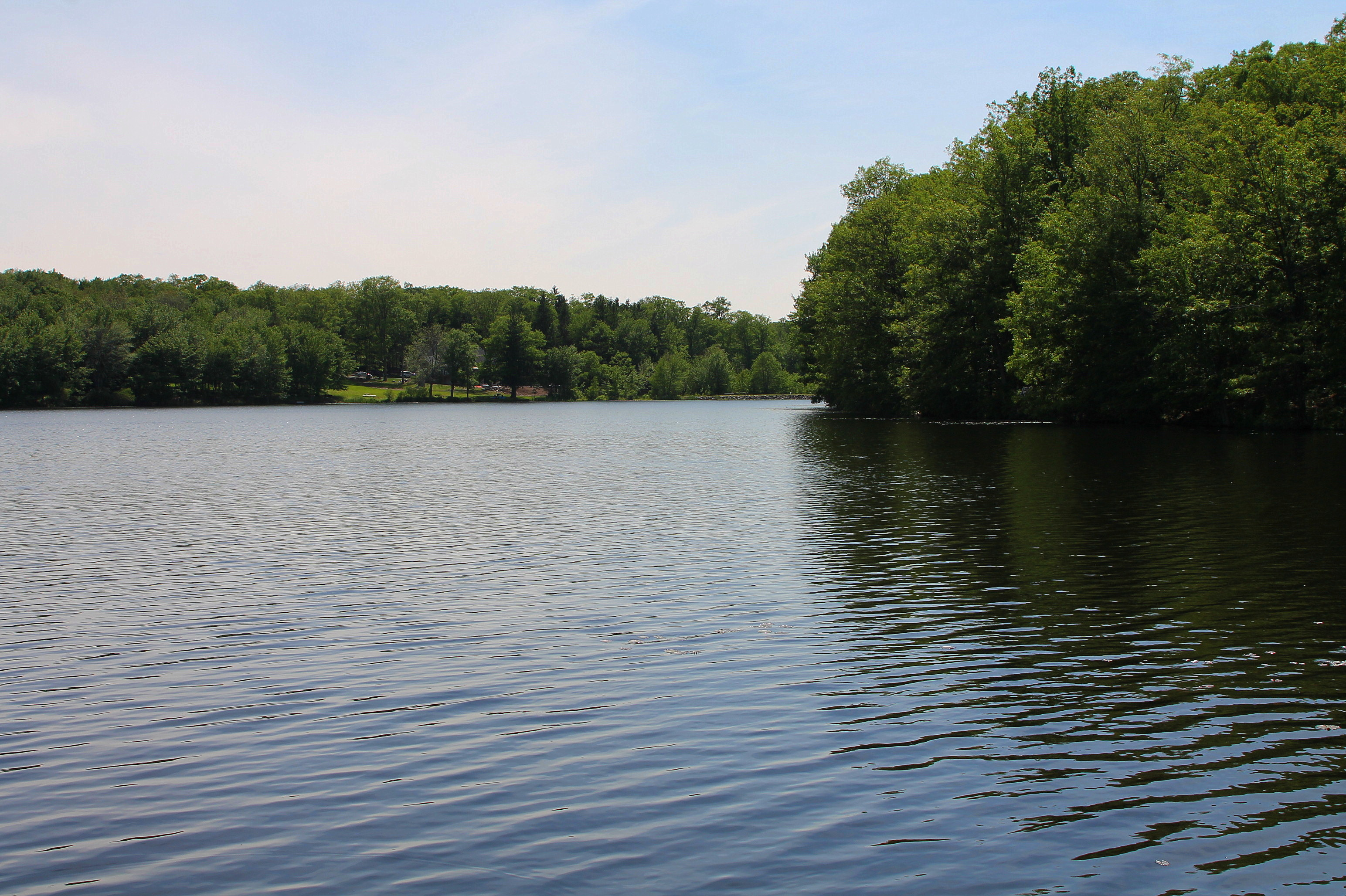
- The Ice Ponds in Rice Township

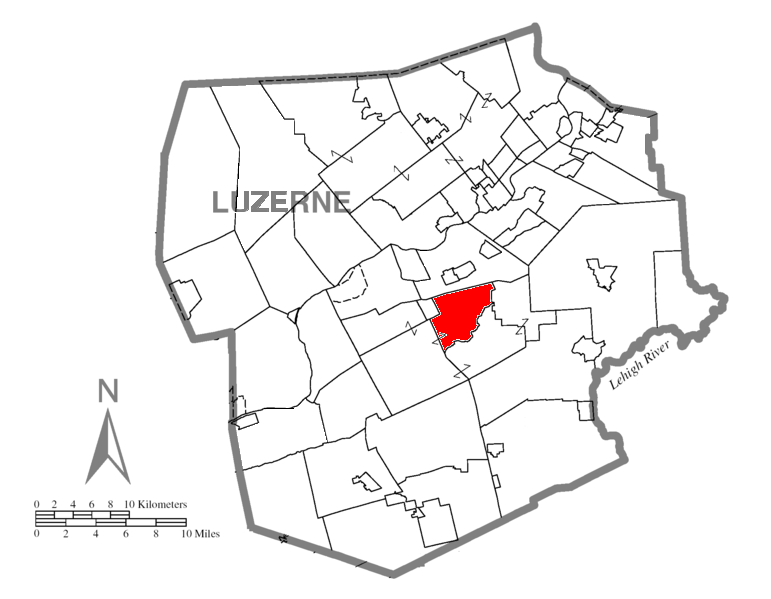
- Map of Luzerne County highlighting Rice Township

- Map of Pennsylvania highlighting Luzerne County
- Country: United States
- State: Pennsylvania
- County: Luzerne

Area
  - Total: 11.17 sq mi (28.94 km^{2})
  - Land: 10.93 sq mi (28.30 km^{2})
  - Water: 0.25 sq mi (0.65 km^{2})

Population (2020)
  - Total: 3,626 ▲
  - Estimate (2021): 3,660
  - Density: 321.7/sq mi (124.22/km^{2})
- Time zone: UTC-5 (Eastern (EST))
  - Summer (DST): UTC-4 (EDT)
- FIPS code: 42-079-64424
- Website: ricetwp.com

Rice Township is a township in Luzerne County, Pennsylvania, United States. The population was 3,626 at the 2020 census.

== History ==
The first recorded white settler in the vicinity of modern-day Rice Township was Conrad Wickeiser in 1798. Samuel B. Stivers and William Vandermark were the first known white settlers in what is now Rice Township. Additional settlers entered the territory and constructed the first houses and sawmills. The first schoolhouse was erected in 1840.

Rice Township was originally part of Hanover and Wright Townships. Hanover was granted to Captain Lazarus Stewart in 1770. On April 12, 1851, Wright Township was formed from a segment of Hanover Township; it was named after the Hon. Hendrick B. Wright of Wilkes-Barre. Rice Township was officially established in 1928 from a piece of Wright Township. In the 1920s and 30s, a major industry in Rice Township was the harvesting of ice, which was sold in both Wilkes-Barre and Hazleton. The ice industry faded with the growing popularity of the electric refrigerator.

== Geography ==
According to the United States Census Bureau, the township has a total area of 11.2 square miles (28.9 km^{2}), of which 10.9 square miles (28.3 km^{2}) is land and 0.23 square miles (0.6 km^{2}), or 2.24%, is water. Rice is part of the Mountain Top region of Luzerne County. I-81 travels north to south through the western half of the township. Homes, businesses, thick forests, and lakes (e.g., Boyle Pond, Lake Blytheburn, Laurel Lakes, and The Ice Ponds) make up most of the municipality. There are several neighborhoods in Rice (one of which is Laurel Lakes). There are also several streams in the township (e.g., Big Wapwallopen Creek, Little Wapwallopen Creek, and Nuangola Outlet).

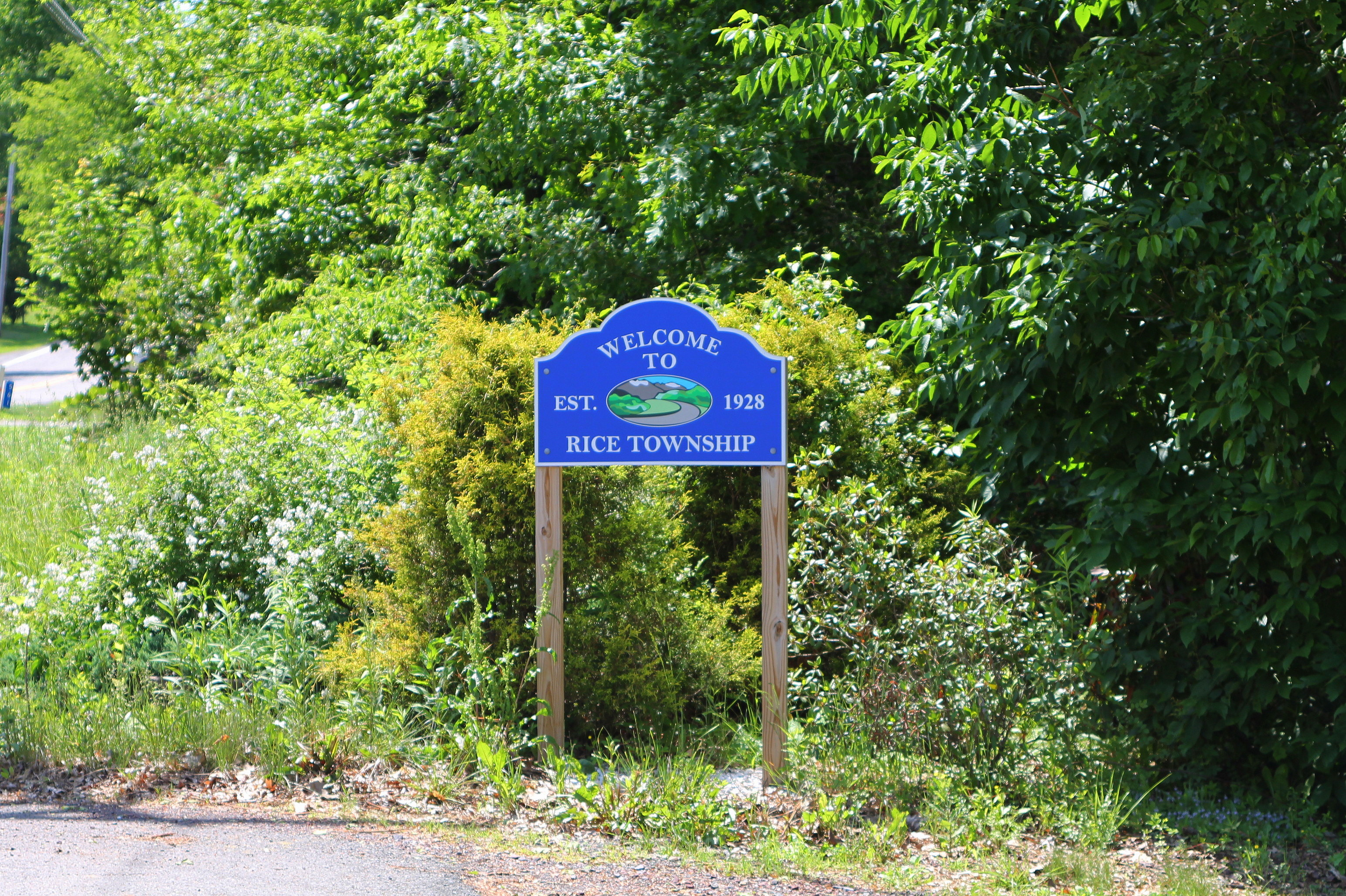
Rice Township welcome sign

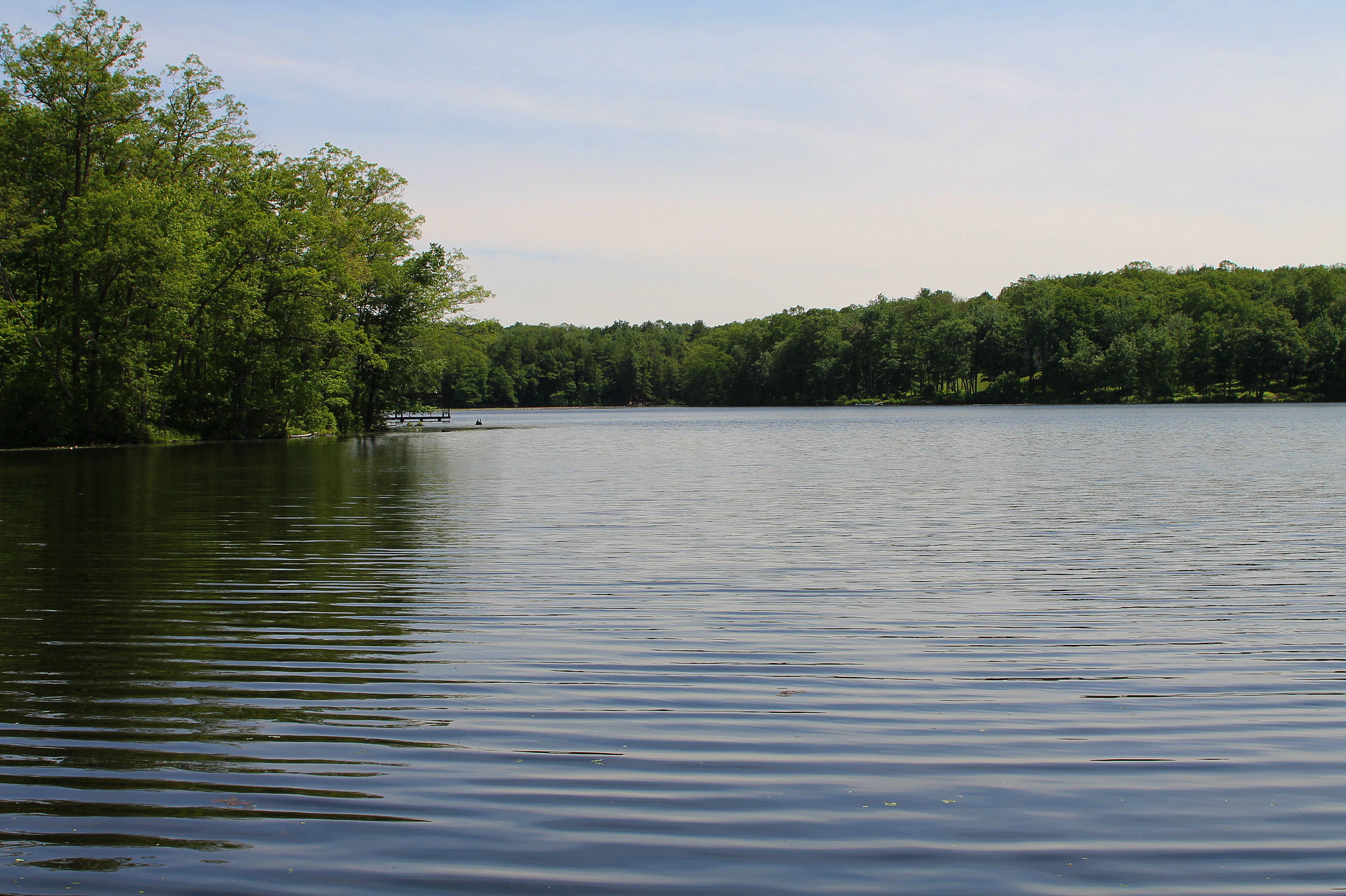
The Ice Ponds

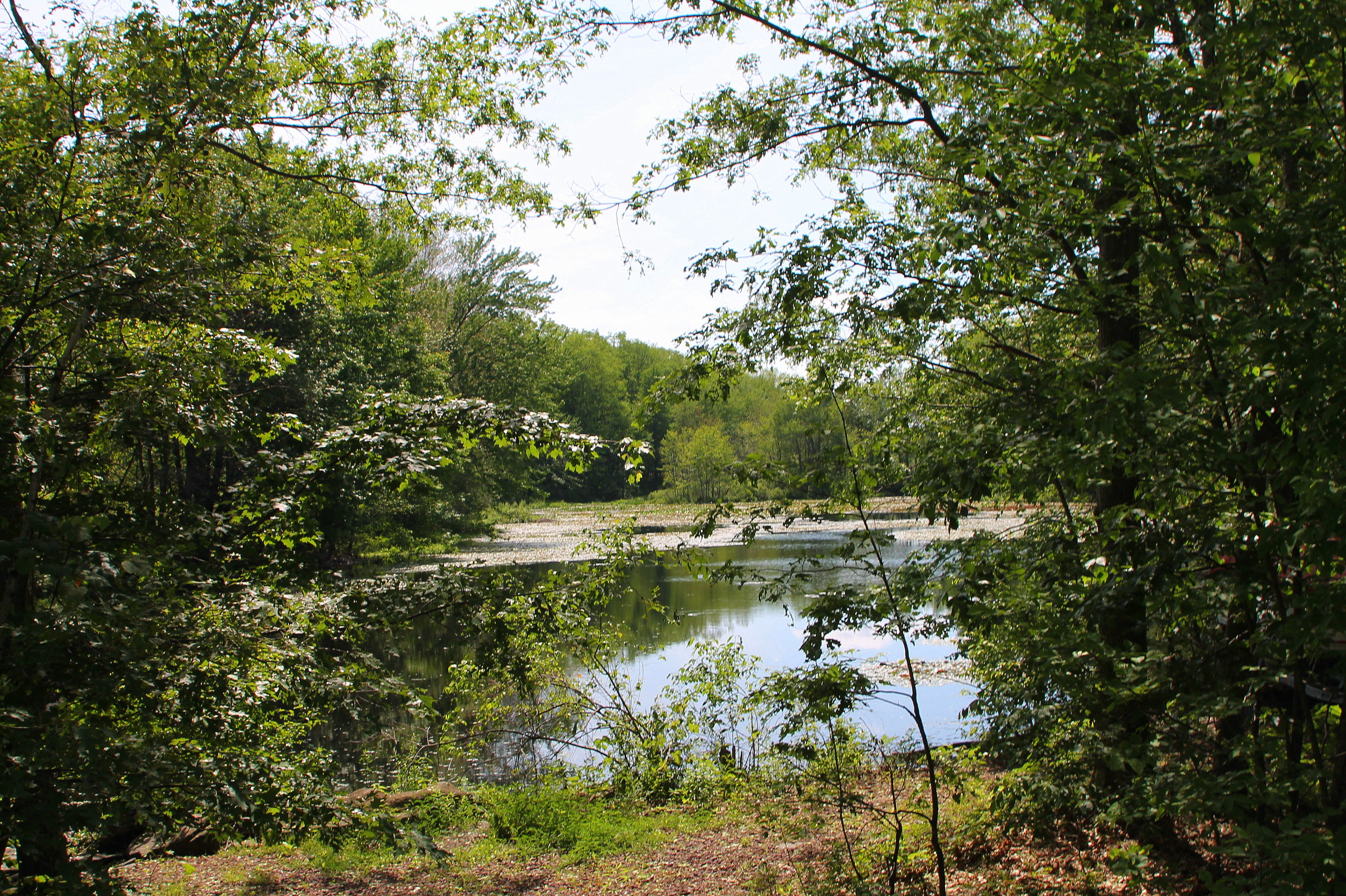
Nuangola Outlet

== Law enforcement ==
Law enforcement is provided by the Rice Township Police; they currently employ up to seven full-time officers, one part-time officer and a dual-purpose K-9 unit.

== Demographics ==
Historical population
Census	Pop.	Note	%±
2000	2,460		—
2010	3,335		35.6%
2020	3,626		8.7%
2021 (est.)	3,660		0.9%
U.S. Decennial Census

As of the census of 2000, there were 2,460 people, 907 households, and 696 families living in the township. The population density was 222.0 inhabitants per square mile (85.7/km^{2}). There were 950 housing units at an average density of 85.7 per square mile (33.1/km^{2}). The racial makeup of the township was 96.67% White, 0.49% African American, 2.03% Asian, 0.37% from other races, and 0.45% from two or more races. Hispanic or Latino of any race were 1.67% of the population.

There were 907 households, out of which 37.0% had children under the age of 18 living with them, 66.6% were married couples living together, 7.3% had a female householder with no husband present, and 23.2% were non-families. 19.6% of all households were made up of individuals, and 7.1% had someone living alone who was 65 years of age or older. The average household size was 2.71 and the average family size was 3.14.

In the township the population was spread out, with 26.7% under the age of 18, 6.2% from 18 to 24, 31.1% from 25 to 44, 25.9% from 45 to 64, and 10.2% who were 65 years of age or older. The median age was 38 years. For every 100 females, there were 93.5 males. For every 100 females age 18 and over, there were 92.2 males.

The median income for a household in the township was $52,888, and the median income for a family was $60,302. Males had a median income of $40,256 versus $24,952 for females. The per capita income for the township was $22,069. About 2.0% of families and 2.4% of the population were below the poverty line, including 4.3% of those under age 18 and 3.2% of those age 65 or over.
