= Lily Lake (Pennsylvania) =

- Long Pond, Beach Pond
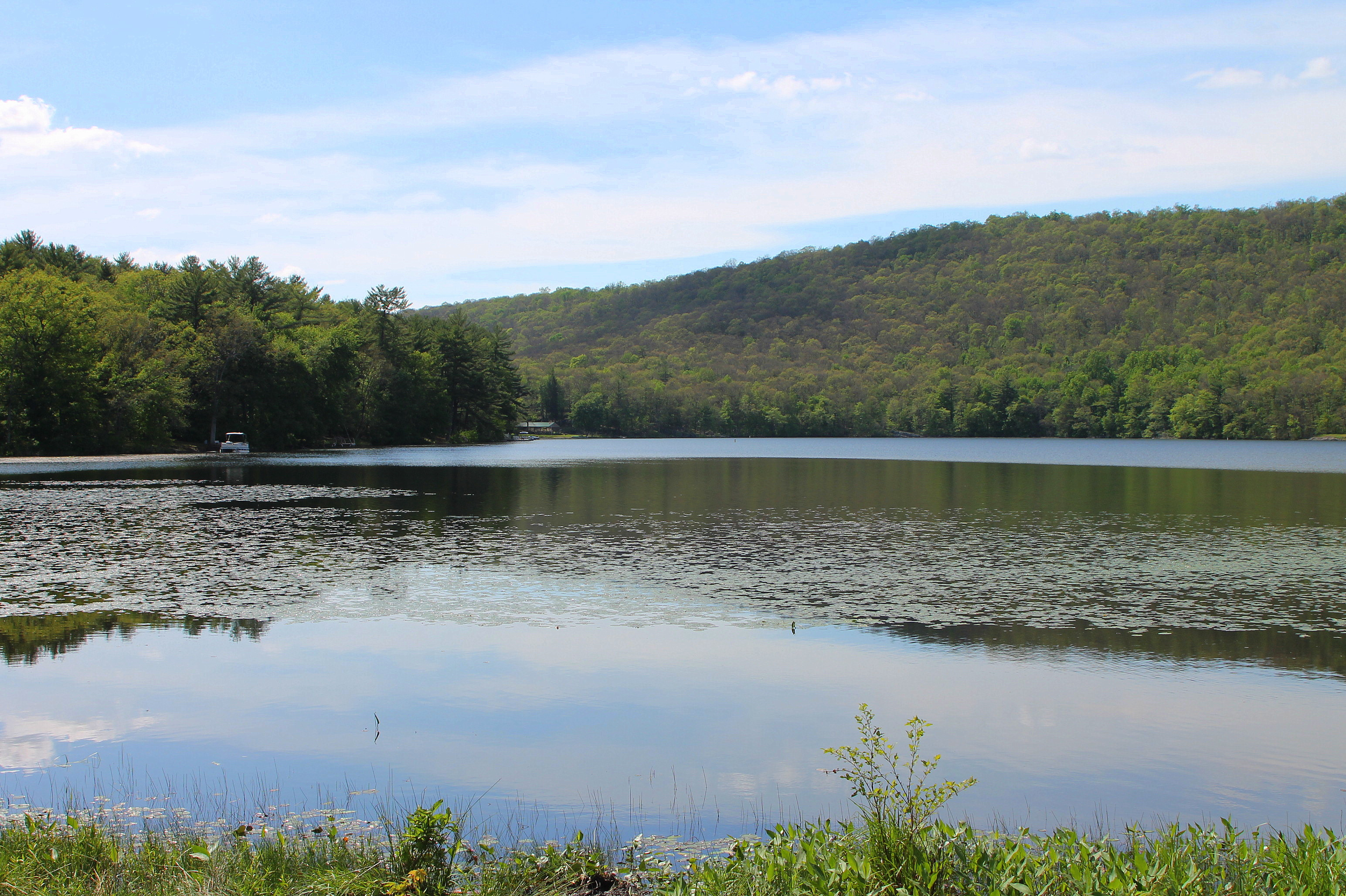
- The western part of Lily Lake

- Location within Pennsylvania Location within the United States
- Location: Luzerne County, Pennsylvania
- Coordinates: 41.142°N 76.083°W
- Type: glacial lake
- Primary inflows: Pond Creek
- Primary outflows: Pond Creek
- Max. length: 1 mile (1.6 km)
- Max. width: 0.5 miles (0.80 km)
- Surface area: 160 acres (65 ha)
- Surface elevation: 1,010 feet (310 m)
- Frozen: as late as March 15

Lily Lake (also known as Long Pond or Beach Pond) is an impoundment and natural lake in Luzerne County, Pennsylvania, in the United States. It has a surface area of approximately 160 acres and is situated on Pond Creek. It is a natural glacial lake in Slocum Township and Conyngham Township. The lake is listed on the Luzerne County Natural Areas Inventory. It is inhabited by eleven species of fish, including alewives and bluegills. The lake has one boat launch.

== Geography and geology ==
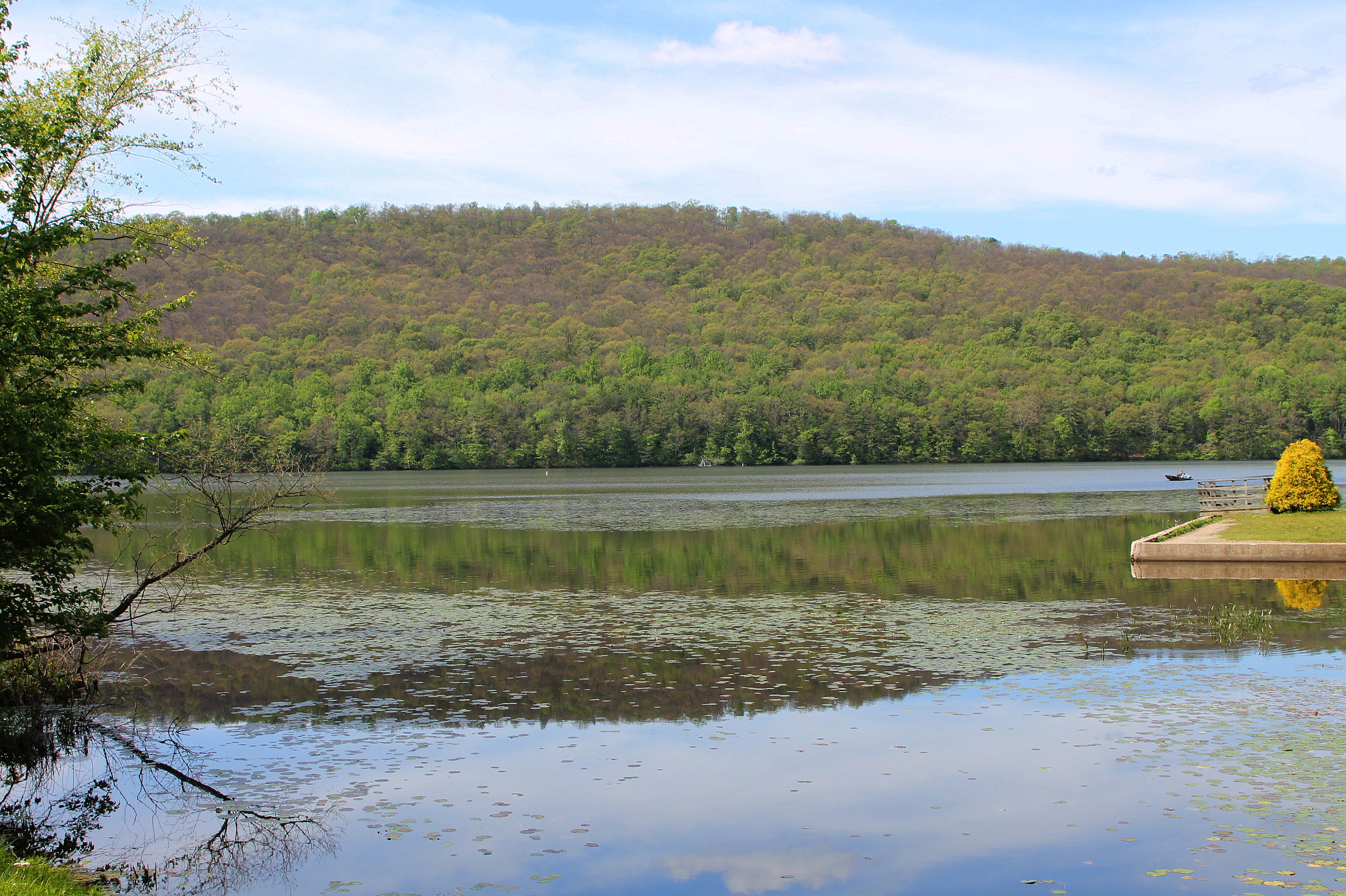
Western part of Lily Lake

The elevation of Lily Lake is 1,010 feet (310 m) above sea level. It has a surface area of approximately 160 acres and is an impoundment. The lake is approximately 1 mile (1.6 km) long and 0.5 miles (0.80 km) wide at its widest.

Lily Lake is in the United States Geological Survey quadrangle of Nanticoke. It is situated in Slocum Township and Conyngham Township. The lake is near the community of Pond Hill. It is hydrologically connected to Cranberry Pond and the Folstown Mud Pond.

A total of 93 percent of the shoreline of Lily Lake is owned by the Pennsylvania Fish and Boat Commission. The remaining 7 percent is private land. In 2014, Lily Lake was frozen until at least March 15. In 1904, the Atlantic Reporter described the lake as being non-navigable and elliptical in shape.

Lily Lake is a natural glacial lake.

== History ==
Lily Lake was entered into the Geographic Names Information System on August 2, 1979. Its identifier in the Geographic Names Information System is 1179343.

Lily Lake is also known as Long Pond. This name appears in Patton's Philadelphia and Suburbs Street and Road Map, which was published in 1984.

Lily Lake was stocked with brook trout, brown trout, and rainbow trout in 1991. It was surveyed four times between 1994 and 2000. It was surveyed again by the Pennsylvania Fish and Boat Commission in 2013. The lake was surveyed once more on May 12, 2014 to examine the effects of alewives on the lake's largemouth bass population.

== Biology ==
Lily Lake is listed on the Luzerne County Natural Areas Inventory.

Eleven species of fish were observed by the Pennsylvania Fish and Boat Commission in Lily Lake in 2013. A total of 365 alewives were caught, as were 333 bluegills with lengths of 2 to 9 inches (5.1 to 22.9 cm). 93 black crappies from 3 to 16 inches (7.6 to 40.6 cm) in length were observed, as were 53 brown bullheads from 10 to 15 inches (25 to 38 cm) in length and 36 golder shiners from 3 to 10 inches (7.6 to 25.4 cm). The survey observed 22 chain pickerels from 13 to 25 inches (33 to 64 cm) in length, 18 pumpkinseeds from 3 to 9 inches (7.6 to 22.9 cm) in length, 12 yellow perches from 8 to 13 inches (20 to 33 cm) in length, and 10 hatchery rainbow trout. It observed seven largemouth bass from 2 to 20 inches (5.1 to 50.8 cm) in length and two northern pike from 20 to 25 inches (51 to 64 cm) in length.

Since alewives were introduced into Lily Lake, bluegill populations have declined by 77 percent and black crappie populations have declined by 79 percent. However, the remaining black crappies are larger than they were prior to the introduction of alewives.

Odonate species inhabiting the area in the vicinity of Lily Lake include Aeshna clepsydra, Celithemis eponina, Libellula incesta, Ischnura kellicotti, and Sympetrum semicinctum. Plant species in the vicinity of the lake include Bidens discoidea, Myriophyllum heterophyllum, Schoenoplectus torreyi, and Utricularia intermedia. Species such as Elatine minima and Potamogeton robbinsii have also been observed near the lake in the past.

== Recreation ==
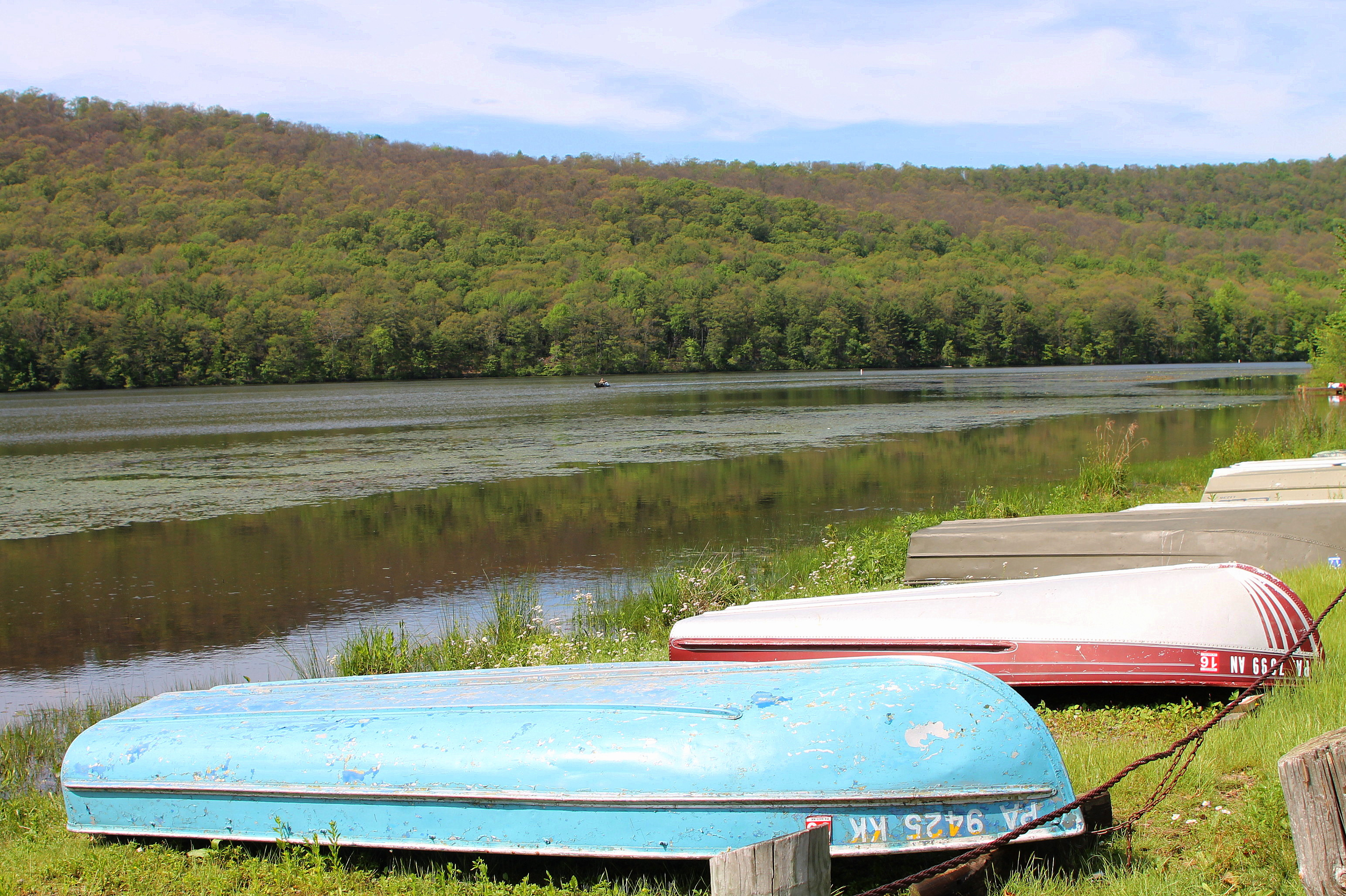
Boats at the eastern part of Lily Lake

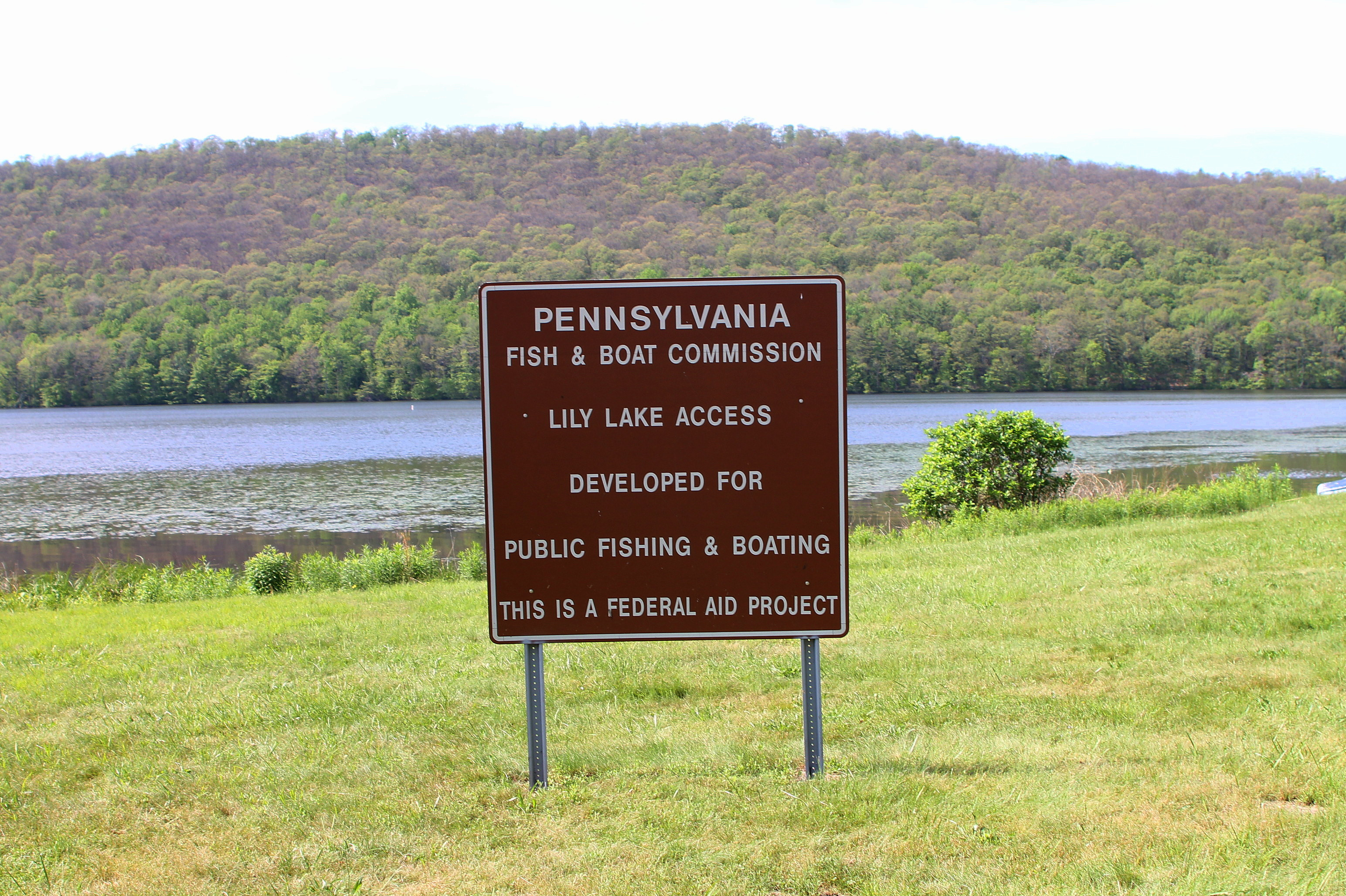
Pennsylvania Fish and Boat Commission sign at Lily Lake

Icefishing and fishing can done on Lily Lake. The lake has one boat launch. However, no boats that are more than 18 feet (5.5 m) long and have engines with no more than 60 horsepower are permitted on the lake. Boats on the lake are also required to travel at limited speeds between noon and sunset from the Saturday before Memorial Day until September 30 as of 1994.

== See also ==
- List of lakes in Pennsylvania
