= Little Wapwallopen Creek =

Tributary of the Susquehanna River, Pennsylvania, United States

Coordinates: 41°05′35″N 76°07′34″W

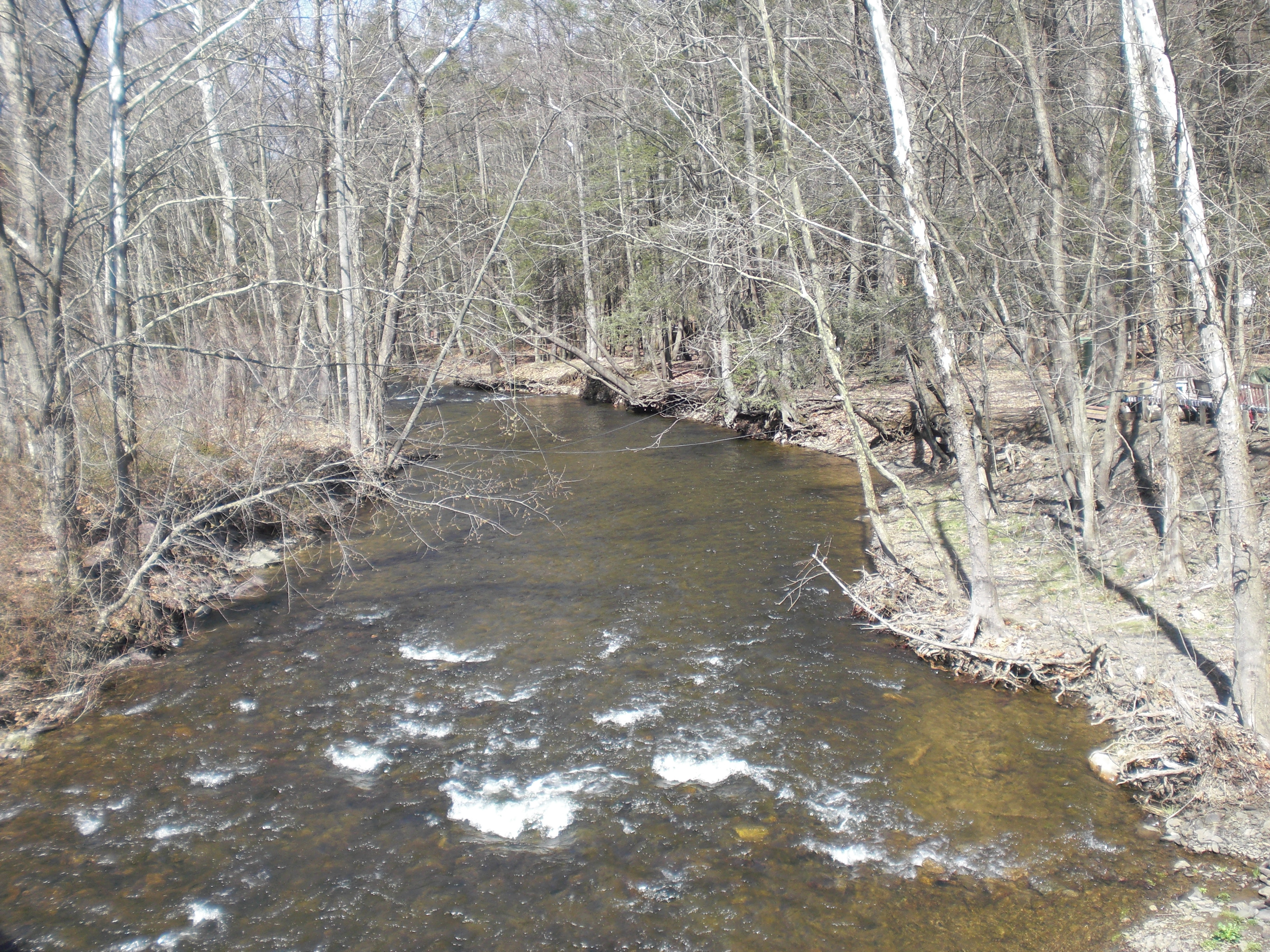
- Little Wapwallopen Creek looking downstream from Ruckle Hill Road

Physical characteristics
- Source
  - location: Boyle Pond in Rice Township, Luzerne County, Pennsylvania
  - elevation: 1,220 ft (370 m)
- Mouth
  - location: Susquehanna River in Conyngham Township, Luzerne County, Pennsylvania
  - elevation: 495 ft (151 m)
- Length: 17 mi (27 km)
- Basin size: 39.5 mi^{2} (102 km^{2})
- Discharge
  - average: 40 cu ft/s (1.1 m^{3}/s) near mouth

Basin features
- Progression: Susquehanna River → Chesapeake Bay
- Tributaries
  - right: Pond Creek, Nuangola Outlet

Little Wapwallopen Creek is a tributary of the Susquehanna River in Luzerne County, Pennsylvania, in the United States. It is approximately 17 miles (27 km) long and flows through Rice Township, Dorrance Township, Conyngham Township, and Hollenback Township. The watershed of the creek has an area of 39.5 square miles (102 km^{2}). The creek is designated as a Coldwater Fishery and a Migratory Fishery and is not considered to be impaired. It has two named tributaries: Pond Creek and Nuangola Outlet. Wild trout naturally reproduce in the creek.

Little Wapwallopen Creek ranges from slightly acidic to slightly basic. It is a significant source of flooding in Conyngham Township, Dorrance Township, and Rice Township. Numerous bridges have been constructed across the creek. The surficial geology in its vicinity consists of alluvium, alluvial terrace, alluvial fan, Wisconsinan Ice-Contact Stratified Drift, Wisconsinan Till, and wetlands. Numerous bridges have also been constructed across the creek.

== Course ==
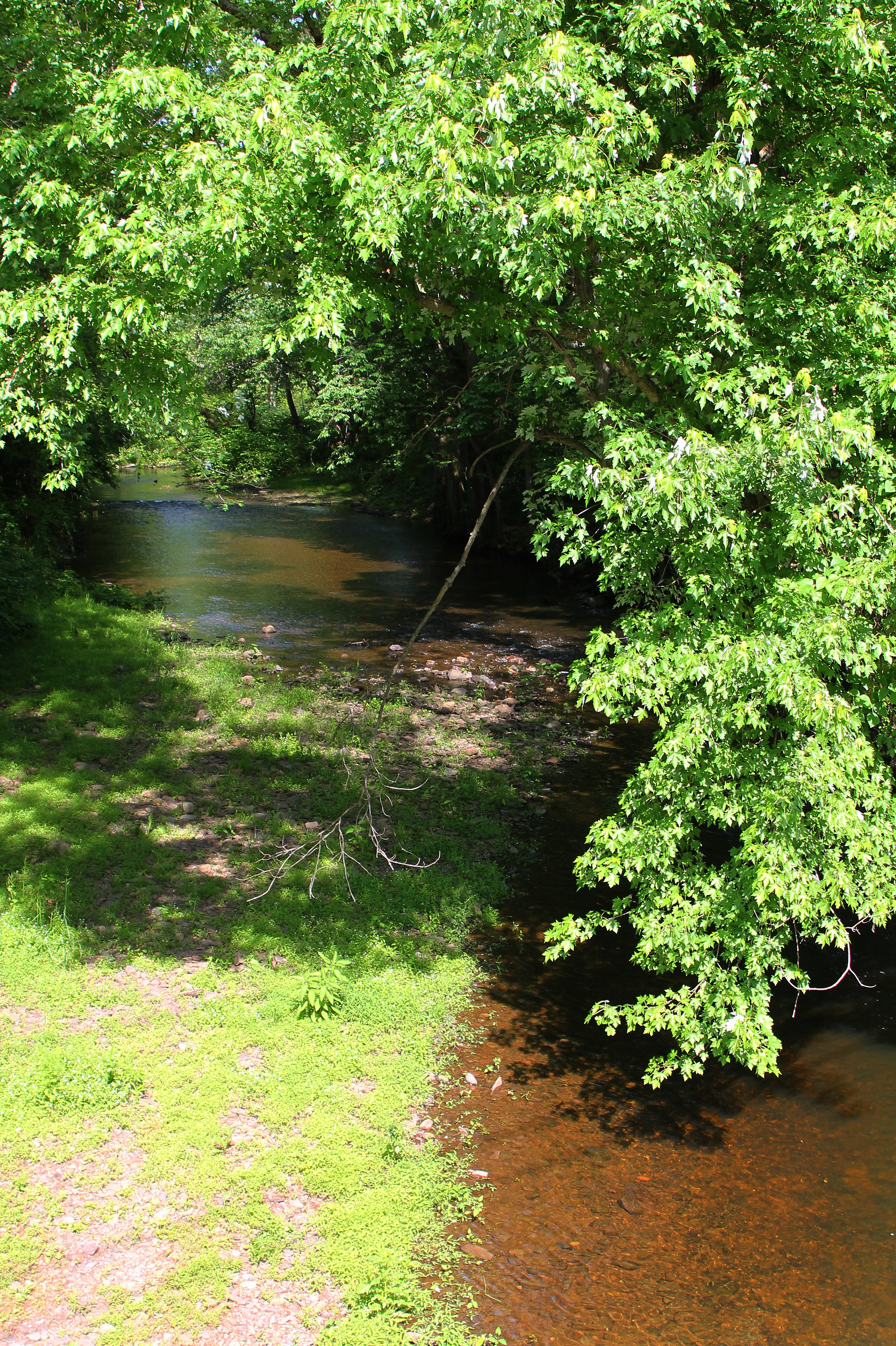
Little Wapwallopen Creek from Pennsylvania Route 239, looking upstream

Little Wapwallopen Creek begins in Boyle Pond in Rice Township. It flows west for several tenths of a mile and passes through another pond before turning south-southwest for more than a mile (two kilometers). It then turns west for a few tenths of a mile and receives Nuangola Outlet, its first named tributary, from the right. The creek turns south-southwest for more than a mile before turning southwest and crossing Interstate 81 and entering Dorrance Township. Several tenths of a mile further downstream, it passes through Andy Pond and turns west-northwest for a short distance. It then turns west-southwest for considerably more than a mile before turning west and then west-northwest. The creek then turns north for a few tenths of a mile before turning west for several tenths of a mile. For the next few miles, it flows roughly west-southwest, entering Conyngham Township. The creek then turns south for several tenths of a mile, briefly entering Hollenback Township before turning north and flowing alongside Hess Mountain as it reenters Conyngham Township. Its valley broadens and it flows west-southwest for a few miles, receiving the tributary Pond Creek and crossing Pennsylvania Route 239. A short distance further downstream, it reaches its confluence with the Susquehanna River.

Little Wapwallopen Creek is approximately 17 miles (27 km) long. It joins the Susquehanna River 168.16 miles (270.63 km) upriver of its mouth.

=== Tributaries ===
Little Wapwallopen Creek has numerous unnamed tributaries and two named tributaries: Nuangola Outlet and Pond Creek. Pond Creek joins Little Wapwallopen Creek 1.52 miles (2.45 km) upstream of its mouth. Its watershed has an area of 9.69 square miles (25.1 km^{2}). Nuangola Outlet joins Little Wapwallopen Creek 14.55 miles (23.42 km) upstream of its mouth. Its watershed has an area of 2.35 square miles (6.1 km^{2}).

== Hydrology ==
The discharge of Little Wapwallopen Creek near its mouth has been observed to range from 0.87 to 54 cubic feet per second (0.025 to 1.529 m^{3}/s). The turbidity level of the creek at this location was once measured to be fewer than 5 Jackson Turbidity Units. Its specific conductance ranged from 60 to 80 micro-siemens per centimeter at 25 °C (77 °F). The creek's pH ranged between a slightly acidic 6.3 and a slightly basic 7.4. The concentration of water hardness ranged from 19 to 23 milligrams per liter (0.019 to 0.023 oz/cu ft). The creek is not considered to be impaired as of 2006.

The concentration of dissolved oxygen in the waters of Little Wapwallopen Creek was measured in the 1970s to be 11.0 milligrams per liter (0.0110 oz/cu ft). The carbon dioxide concentration ranged from 0.5 to 9.7 milligrams per liter (0.00050 to 0.00969 oz/cu ft). The concentration of bicarbonate ranged from 8 to 12 milligrams per liter (0.0080 to 0.0120 oz/cu ft) and no carbonate was observed.

The concentration of organic nitrogen in Little Wapwallopen Creek was once measured to be 0.06 milligrams per liter (6.0×10^{−5} oz/cu ft) and the ammonia concentration was once measured to be 0.064 milligrams per liter (6.4×10^{−5} oz/cu ft). The concentration of nitrogen in the form of nitrates was measured to be 0.74 milligrams per liter (0.00074 oz/cu ft) and the concentration of nitrogen in the form of nitrites was measured to be 0.13 milligrams per liter (0.00013 oz/cu ft).

In the 1970s, the concentration of calcium in the waters of Little Wapwallopen Creek were found to range from 5.00 to 5.90 milligrams per liter (0.00499 to 0.00589 oz/cu ft). The magnesium concentration ranged from 1.50 to 2.20 milligrams per liter (0.00150 to 0.00220 oz/cu ft). The combined concentrations of sodium and potassium ranged from 2.3 to 3.0 milligrams per liter (0.0023 to 0.0030 oz/cu ft) and the recoverable iron concentration was once measured at 0.08 milligrams per liter (8.0×10^{−5} oz/cu ft). The sulfate concentration ranged from 12.0 to 16.0 milligrams per liter and the concentration of chloride ranged from 2.3 to 7.0 milligrams per liter (0.0023 to 0.0070 oz/cu ft).

The concentration of dissolved solids in Little Wapwallopen Creek was once measured to be 60 milligrams per liter (0.060 oz/cu ft).

At its mouth, the peak annual discharge of Little Wapwallopen Creek has a 10 percent chance of reaching 2,750 cubic feet per second (78 m^{3}/s). It has a 2 percent chance of reaching 5,250 cubic feet per second (149 m^{3}/s) and a 1 percent chance of reaching 7,000 cubic feet per second (200 m^{3}/s). The peak annual discharge has a 0.2 percent chance of reaching 12,500 cubic feet per second (350 m^{3}/s). Upstream of the tributary Pond Creek, the peak annual discharge of the creek has a 10 percent chance of reaching 2,150 cubic feet per second (61 m^{3}/s). It has a 2 percent chance of 4,400 cubic feet per second (120 m^{3}/s) and a 1 percent chance of reaching 5,900 cubic feet per second (170 m^{3}/s). The peak annual discharge has a 0.2 percent chance of reaching 10,400 cubic feet per second (290 m^{3}/s).

At a point 0.6 miles (0.97 km) downstream of Blue Ridge Trail, the peak annual discharge of Little Wapwallopen Creek has a 10 percent chance of reaching 1,400 cubic feet per second (40 m^{3}/s). It has a 2 percent chance of reaching 2,300 cubic feet per second (65 m^{3}/s) and a 1 percent chance of reaching 2,700 cubic feet per second (76 m^{3}/s). The peak annual discharge has a 0.2 percent chance of reaching 3,900 cubic feet per second (110 m^{3}/s). At a point 0.3 miles (0.48 km) upstream of Blue Ridge Trail, the peak annual discharge of the creek has a 10 percent chance of reaching 1,250 cubic feet per second (35 m^{3}/s). It has a 2 percent chance of 2,070 cubic feet per second (59 m^{3}/s) and a 1 percent chance of reaching 2,470 cubic feet per second (70 m^{3}/s). The peak annual discharge has a 0.2 percent chance of reaching 3,550 cubic feet per second (101 m^{3}/s).

== Geography, geology, and climate ==
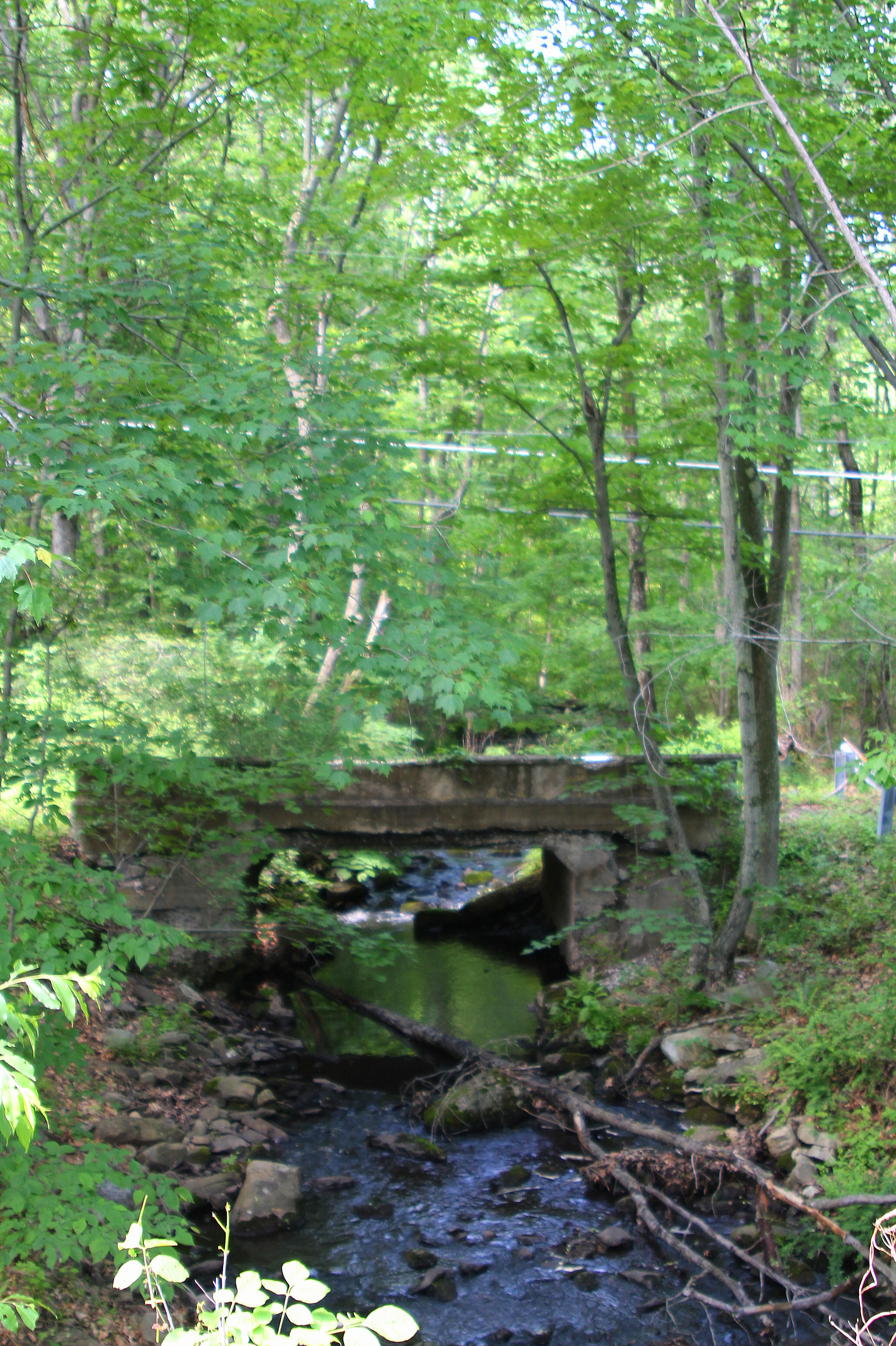
Little Wapwallopen Creek in its upper reaches looking upstream

The elevation near the mouth of Little Wapwallopen Creek is 495 feet (151 m) above sea level. The elevation of the creek's source is approximately 1,220 feet (370 m) above sea level. The course of the creek is tortuous.

Alluvium, which consists of stratified sand, silt, and gravel, as well as some boulders, occurs in the valley of Little Wapwallopen Creek to a depth of 10 feet (3.0 m) or more. Numerous deposits of Wisconsinan Ice-Contact Stratified Drift are present as well. Alluvial terrace also occurs near the creek, which is the only place in the quadrangle of Sybertsville that contains it in the surficial geology. Wisconsinan Loess, which consists of windblown silt and fine sand, occurs in the southern part of the creek's valley in the Sybertsville quadrangle. The remains of outwash terraces also occur near the creek in that quadrangle.

In the Sybertsville quadrangle, the surficial geology in the valley of Little Wapwallopen Creek mainly consists of alluvium, alluvial terrace, alluvial fan, Wisconsinan Ice-Contact Stratified Drift, and some small patches of Wisconsinan Till. The surficial geology on the valley slopes and uplands mainly consists of bedrock. In the quadrangle of Freeland, the surficial geology near Little Wapwallopen Creek mainly features Wisconsinan Till, Wisconsinan Ice-Contact Stratified Drift, and alluvium. The surficial geology near the creek in the Wilkes-Barre West quadrangle mainly consists of Wisconsinan Till, with some scattered areas of bedrock and alluvium.

The Berwick Axis, which is also known as the Montour Axis, crosses the Susquehanna River half a mile downstream of the mouth of Little Wapwallopen Creek. There is concealed Marcellus shale near the creek in Hollenback Township.

The water temperature of Little Wapwallopen Creek near Wapwallopen was measured several times during the 1970s. The values ranged from 7.0 °C (44.6 °F) in May 1971 to 19.5 °C (67.1 °F) in September 1972.

== Watershed ==
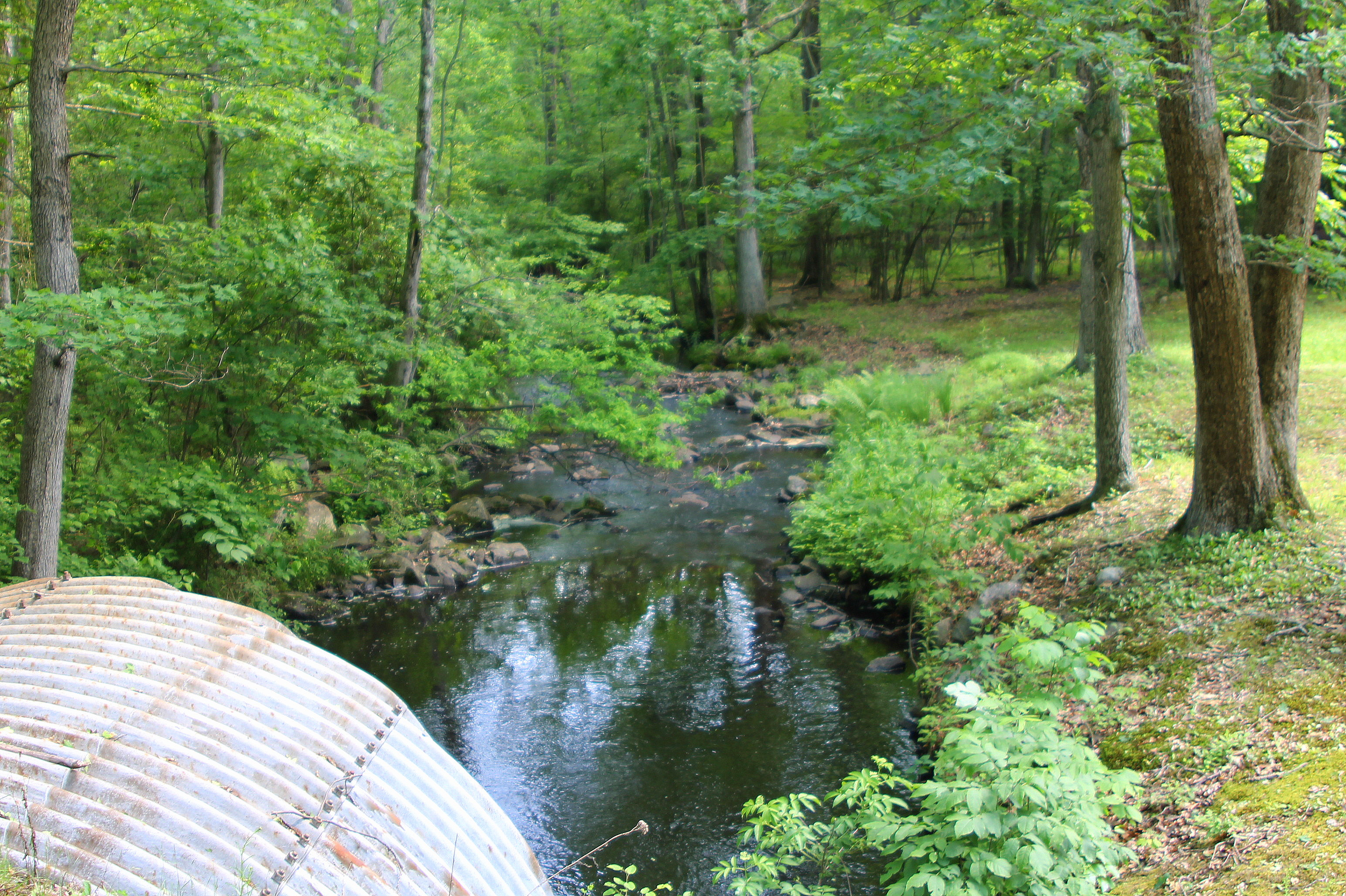
Little Wapwallopen Creek in its upper reaches looking downstream

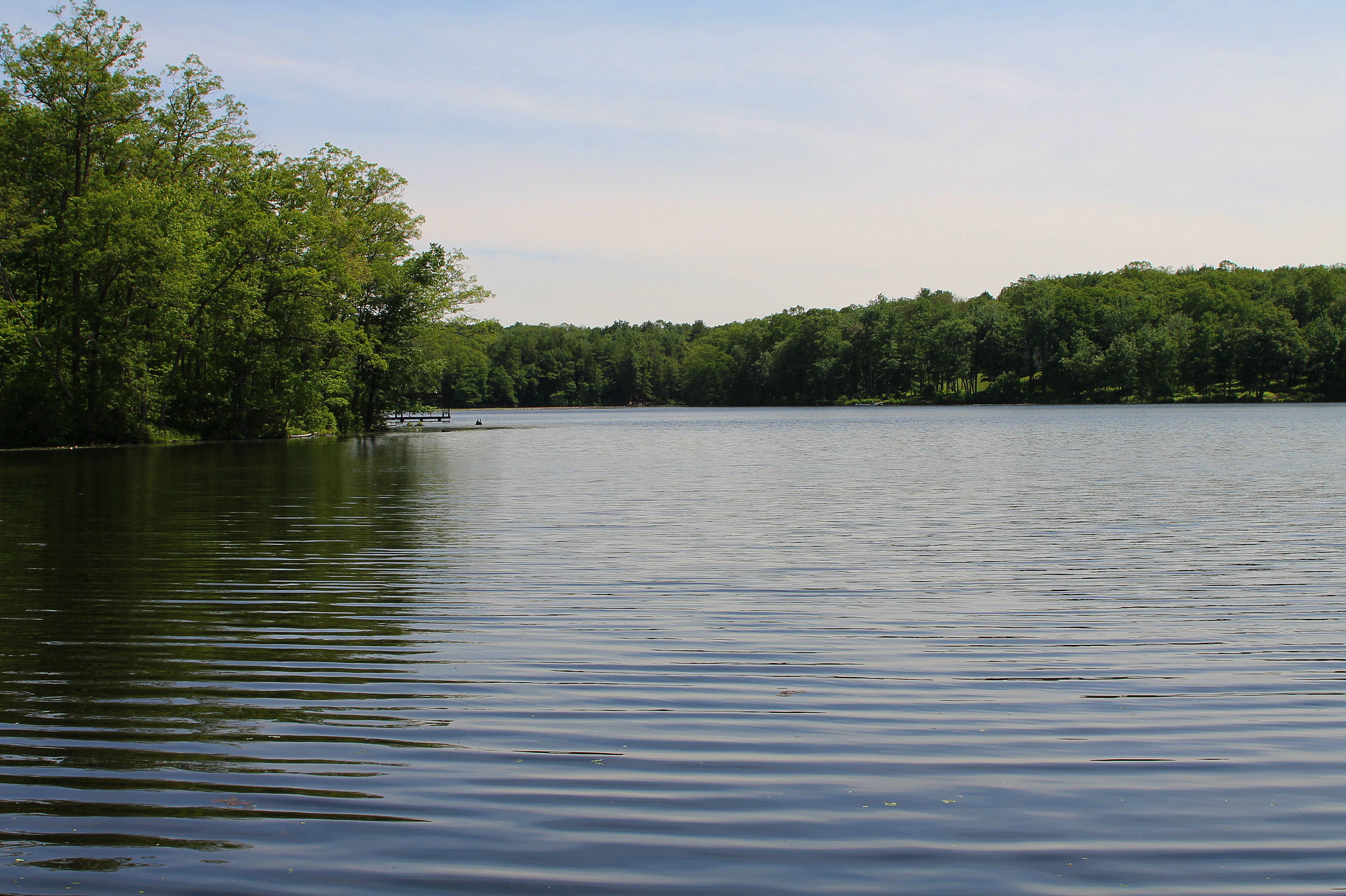
View of The Ice Ponds in Rice Township, Luzerne County, PA

The watershed of Little Wapwallopen Creek has an area of 39.5 square miles (102 km^{2}). The mouth of the creek is in the United States Geological Survey quadrangle of Berwick. However, its source is in the quadrangle of Wilkes-Barre West. It also flows through the quadrangles of Freeland and Sybertsville. The creek is one of the major streams in Luzerne County.

The land in the 100 year floodplain of Little Wapwallopen Creek mainly consists of agricultural and forested land. However, there are also some areas of rural residential land. A natural gas pipeline 42 inches (110 cm) in diameter and owned by the Transcontinental Gas Pipeline Company crosses an unnamed tributary of Little Wapwallopen Creek. Numerous bridges have also been constructed across the creek.

A 160-acre (65 ha) lake known as Lilly Lake is in the watershed of Little Wapwallopen Creek, on one of its tributaries. A pond known as Triangle Pond is also in the upper reaches of the watershed. Henry C. Bradsby's book History of Luzerne County, Pennsylvania described Round Pond as being in the watershed as well. A swamp known as Turner Swamp is also in the watershed. Other lakes in the creek's vicinity include Andy Pond, Lake Blytheburn, Boyle Pond, Nuangola Lake, and the Ice Ponds. Many patches of wetlands are found in the watershed's upper reaches.

A package wastewater treatment facility operated by the Crestwood School District discharges into Little Wapwallopen Creek in Rice Township. It has a capacity of 11,000 US gallons (42,000 L) per day. Another package wastewater treatment facility is operated by Wilbar Realty in the same township and discharges into the creek. It serves 176 homes in Laurel Lake Village and has a capacity of 87,500 US gallons (331,000 L).

Little Wapwallopen Creek is one of the main sources of flooding in Conyngham Township, along with the Susquehanna River. The creek is also the main source of flooding in Dorrance Township and one of the main sources in Rice Township. A 100 year flood of the creek would flood substantial areas. Such flooding would also be exacerbated by backwater flooding from the Susquehanna River.

== History ==
Little Wapwallopen Creek was entered into the Geographic Names Information System on August 2, 1979. Its identifier in the Geographic Names Information System is 1179707.

Historically, a Native American path went from Council Cup up the Little Wapwallopen Creek valley and to Wilkes-Barre. The path ran from Council Cup to the creek and then northeast alongside it before going past Lily Lake and over Penobscot Mountain towards where Wilkes-Barre is now located. The first person to settle in Conyngham Township was Martin Harter, who settled on the creek near its mouth in 1795.

In the late 1800s, there was an old ferry road near the mouth of Little Wapwallopen Creek. A railroad bridge also crosses the creek. Historically, a road ran from a small settlement on Big Wapwallopen Creek to an even smaller one on Little Wapwallopen Creek, near where Church Road presently is. The Glen Brook Water Company once had plans to construct a dam on the creek and also on its tributary Pond Creek. The Wilkes-Barre Ice Company and the Hazleton Ice Company also dammed a stream in the creek's watershed in 1912 and 1916 respectively, forming the Ice Ponds.

Numerous bridges have been constructed across the creek. A concrete stringer/multi-beam or girder bridge carrying Blytheburn Road was built over Little Wapwallopen Creek in 1920. It is 33.1 feet (10.1 m) long. A concrete slab bridge was built across the creek in 1935 and repaired in 2007. It is 23.0 feet (7.0 m) long and carries T-477/Weyhenmyr Street. In 1940, a bridge carrying Pennsylvania Route 239 was constructed over the creek in Conyngham Township. This bridge is a steel stringer/multi-beam or girder bridge with a length of 65.0 feet (19.8 m) long.

A three-span bridge carrying Interstate 81 northbound over Little Wapwallopen Creek was constructed in Rice Township in 1964 and repaired in 1987. This bridge is a prestressed box beam bridge with a length of 162.1 feet (49.4 m). A bridge of the same type was built over the creek for Interstate 81 southbound in 1965. This bridge was also repaired in 1987 and is 185.0 feet (56.4 m) long. In 1975, a prestressed stringer/multi-beam or girder bridge carrying State Route 3008/Ruckle Hill Road was built over the creek. This bridge is 92.9 feet (28.3 m) long and is in Conyngham Township. A prestressed box beam or girders bridge was built in Dorrance Township in 1988. It is 63.0 feet (19.2 m) long. Another bridge of the same type, but with a length of 37.1 feet (11.3 m) was constructed in 1996 for T-406/Georges Road. A steel girder and floorbeam system bridge was built over the creek in 1997. It is 60.0 feet (18.3 m) long and carries T-392/Hollow Road.

Floodwaters from Little Wapwallopen Creek reached a height of 2 feet (0.61 m) over St. Marys Road in Dorrance Township during a storm in 1972. This is the only recorded flooding of a developed area caused by a major storm in the township. The creek also once flooded to a depth of 18 to 20 inches (46 to 51 cm) over Hislop Road in Rice Township.

In August 2002, the Pennsylvania Environmental Council received $57,897.76 to carry out a restoration plan on the upper reaches of Little Wapwallopen Creek. Since 2005, a project to remedy streambank erosion on the creek has been successful. The creek has a watershed association known as the Little Wapwallopen Creek Watershed Association.

== Biology ==
The drainage basin of Little Wapwallopen Creek is designated as a Coldwater Fishery and a Migratory Fishery. Wild trout naturally reproduce in the creek from its mouth upstream for 4.40 miles (7.08 km) to T-392. They also do so in the tributary Pond Creek from its headwaters downstream to its mouth.

Henry C. Bradsby's 1893 book History of Luzerne County, Pennsylvania stated that Long Pond and Round Pond, two ponds in the watershed, had a large fish population. The creek was stocked with 700 fingerling, yearling, and adult brook trout in 1909.

The greenway of Little Wapwallopen Creek has been proposed as a conservation area in the Open Space, Greenways & Outdoor Recreation Master Plan for Luzerne County and Lackawanna County.

== See also ==
- Rocky Run (Susquehanna River), next tributary of the Susquehanna River going upriver
- Big Wapwallopen Creek, next tributary of the Susquehanna River going downriver
- List of rivers of Pennsylvania
