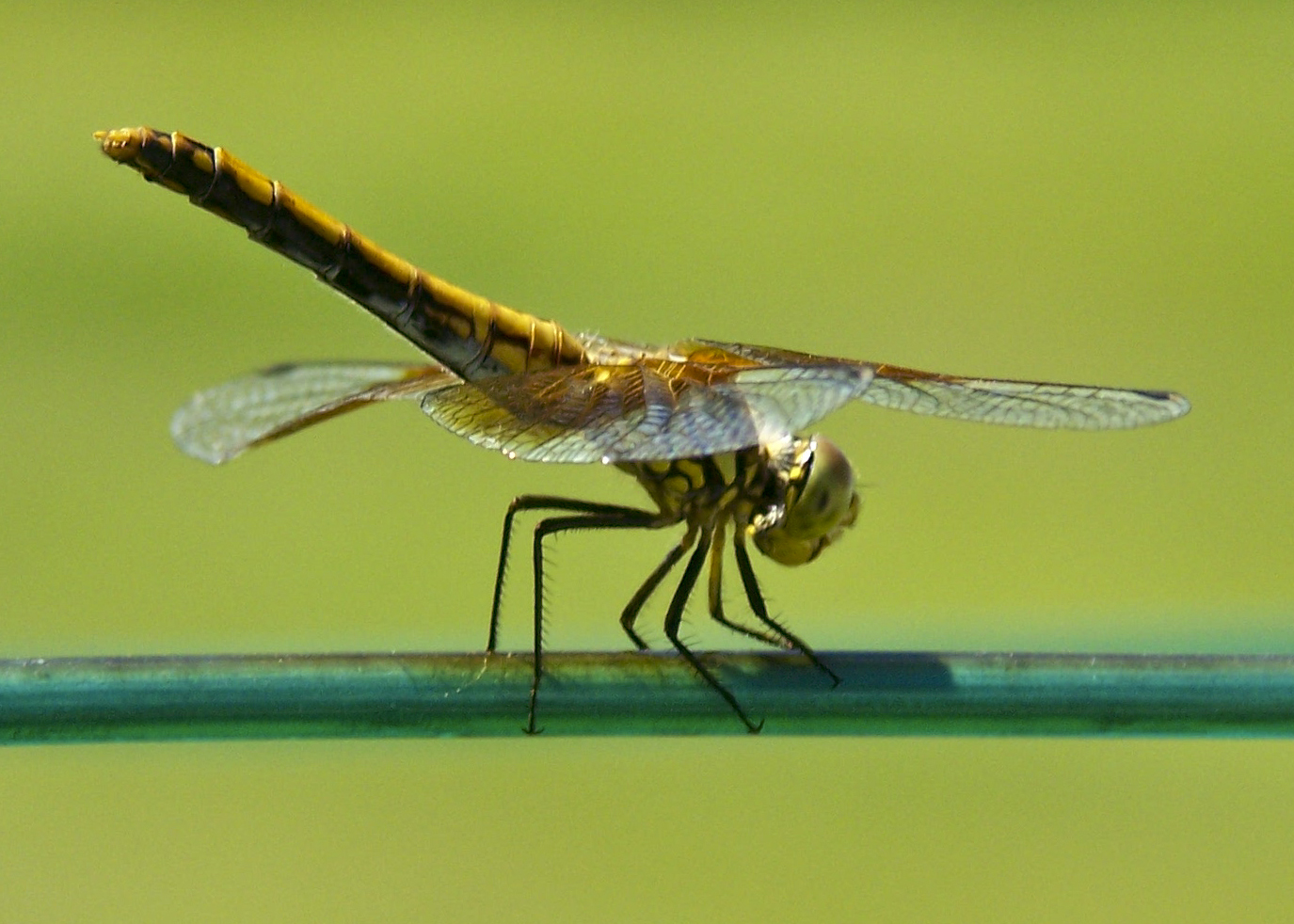
- Sympetrum occidentale

Scientific classification
- Domain: Eukaryota
- Kingdom: Animalia
- Phylum: Arthropoda
- Class: Insecta
- Order: Odonata
- Infraorder: Anisoptera
- Family: Libellulidae
- Genus: Sympetrum
- Species: S. occidentale

Binomial name
- Sympetrum occidentale Bartenef, 1915

= Western meadowhawk =

Species of dragonfly

The Western Meadowhawk (Sympetrum occidentale) is a dragonfly of the family Libellulidae, native to western North America. In adult form, the Meadowhawk has a length of 1 1/4 to 1 5/8 inches (31 to 40 mm). The key distinguishing feature is a cloudy, orange-brown band that covers the inner half of each wing. The band may appear darker towards the outside. Males have a yellowish thorax, marked with wavy black lines on each side, and a red to reddish brown abdomen, marked with black along the bottom edge of each side. Females are olive to golden brown and marked similarly.
