= Luzerne County, Pennsylvania =

County in Pennsylvania, United States

Coordinates: 41.18°N 75.99°W

Luzerne County
- County
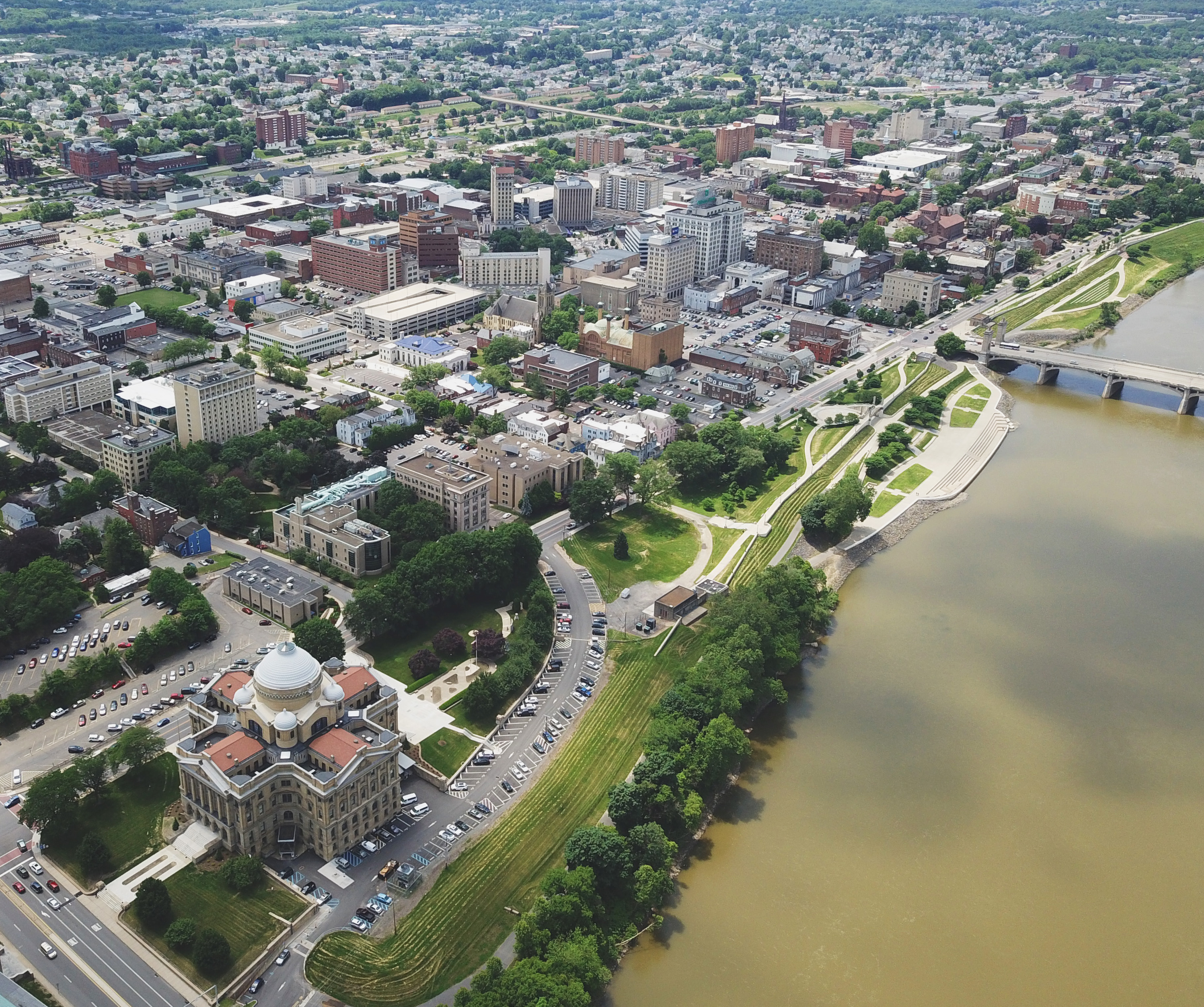
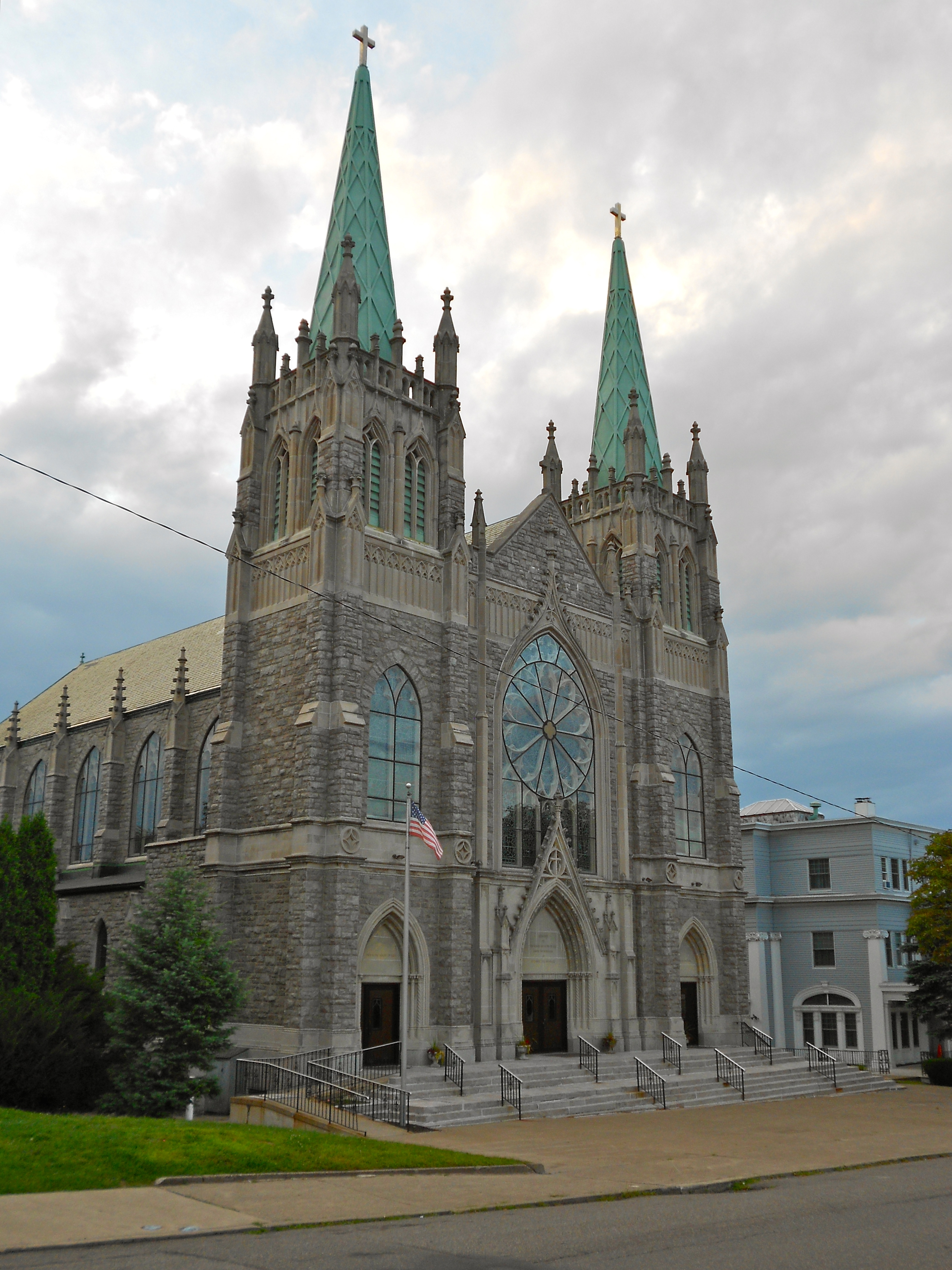
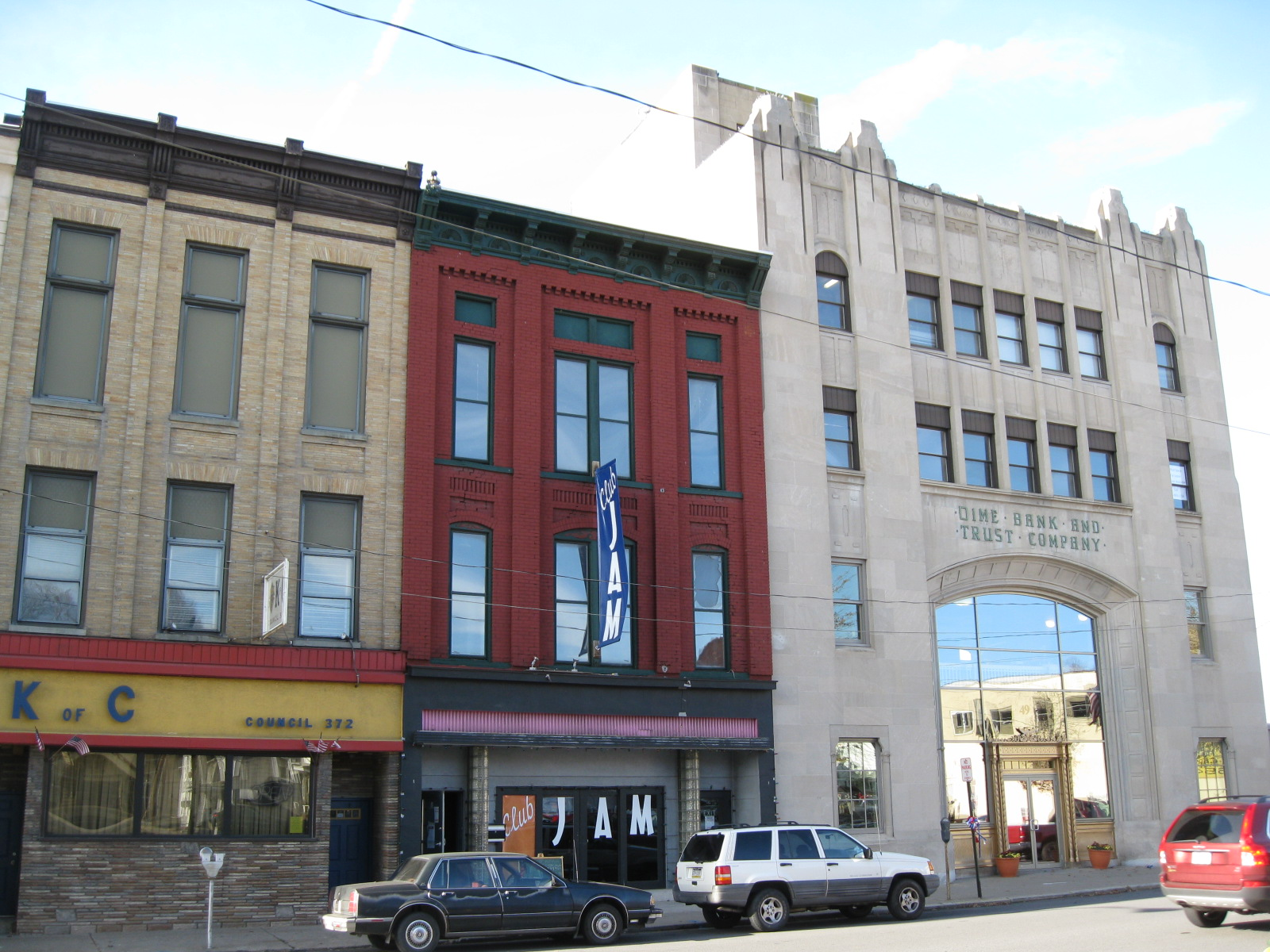
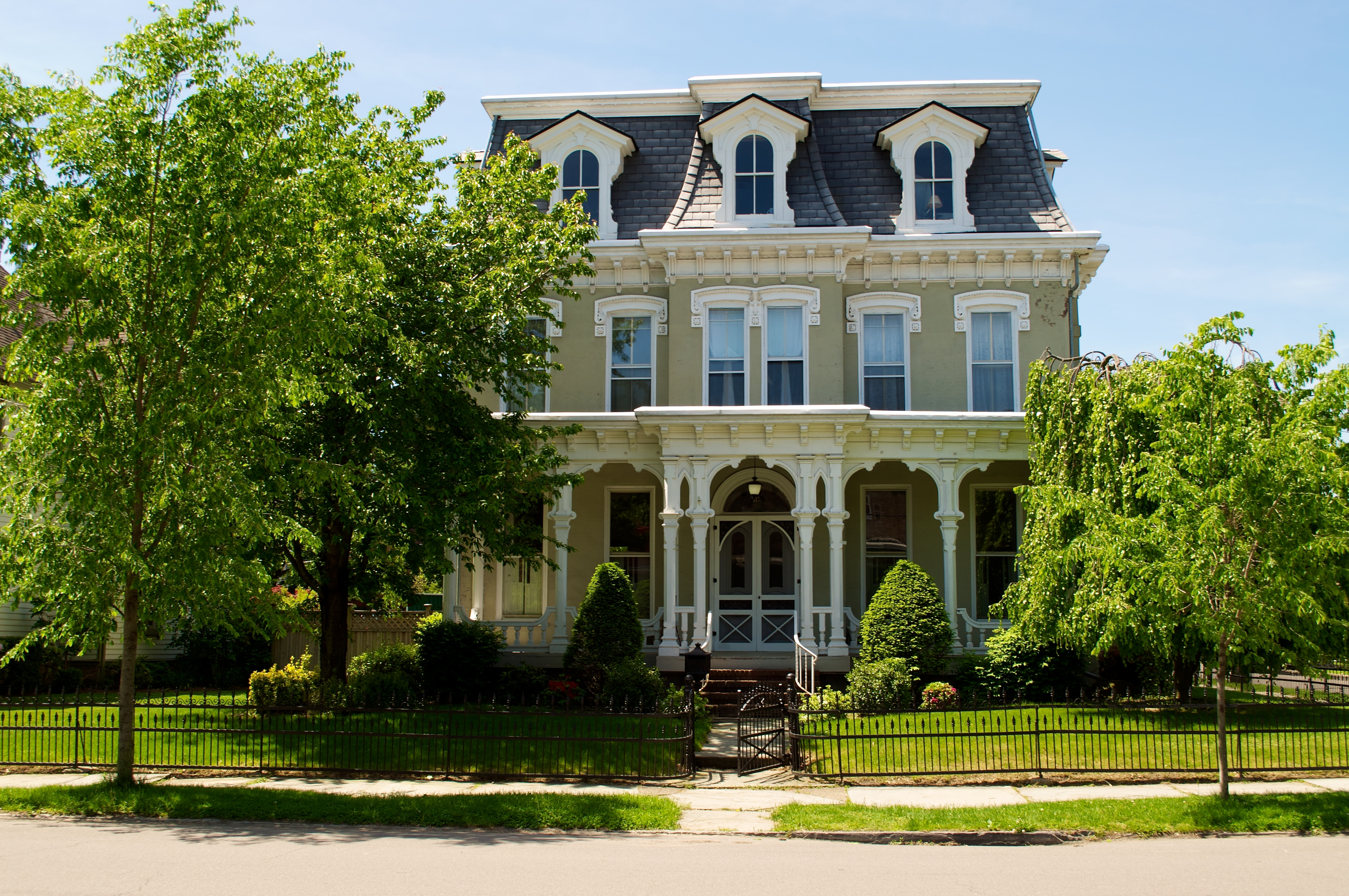
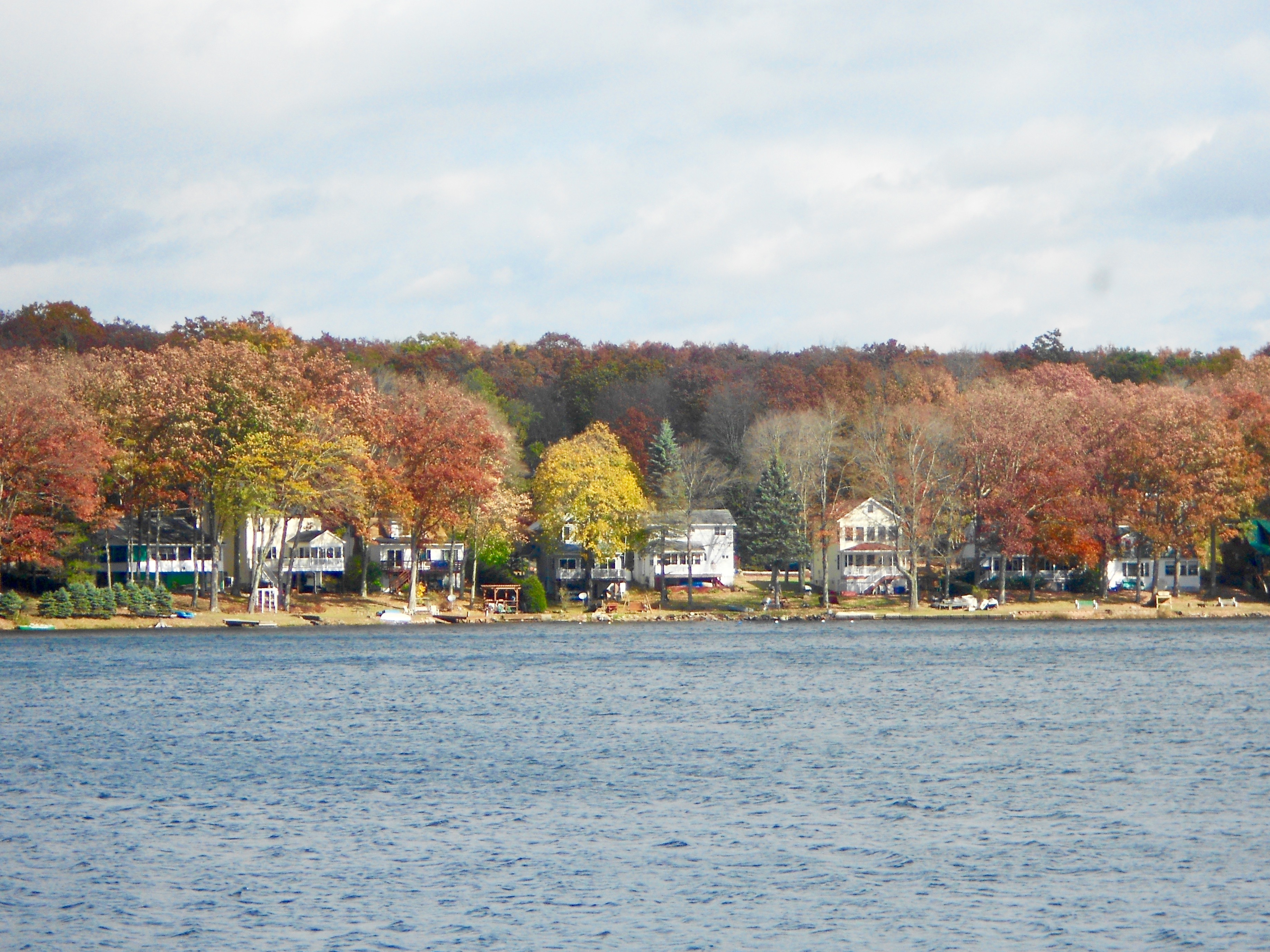
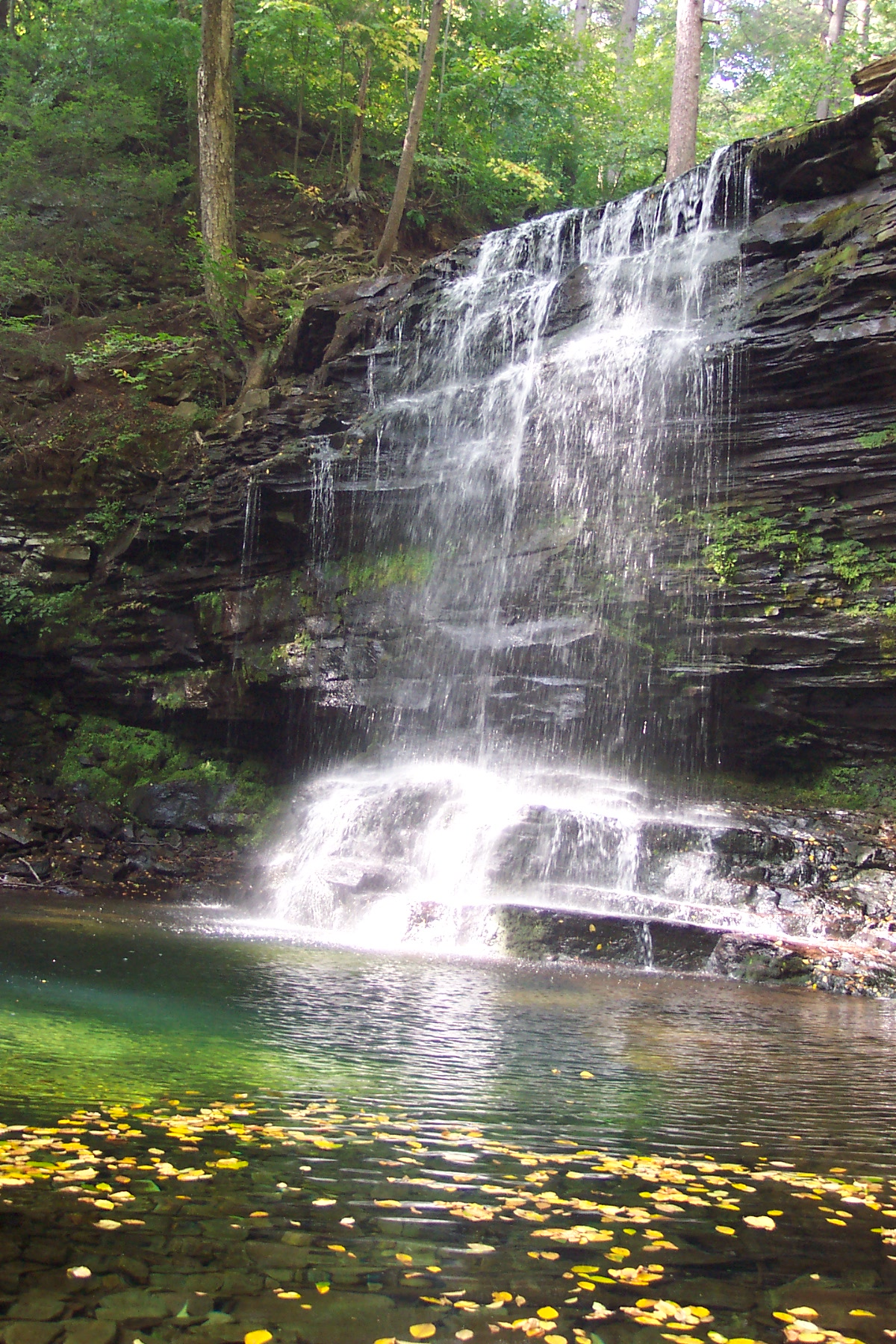
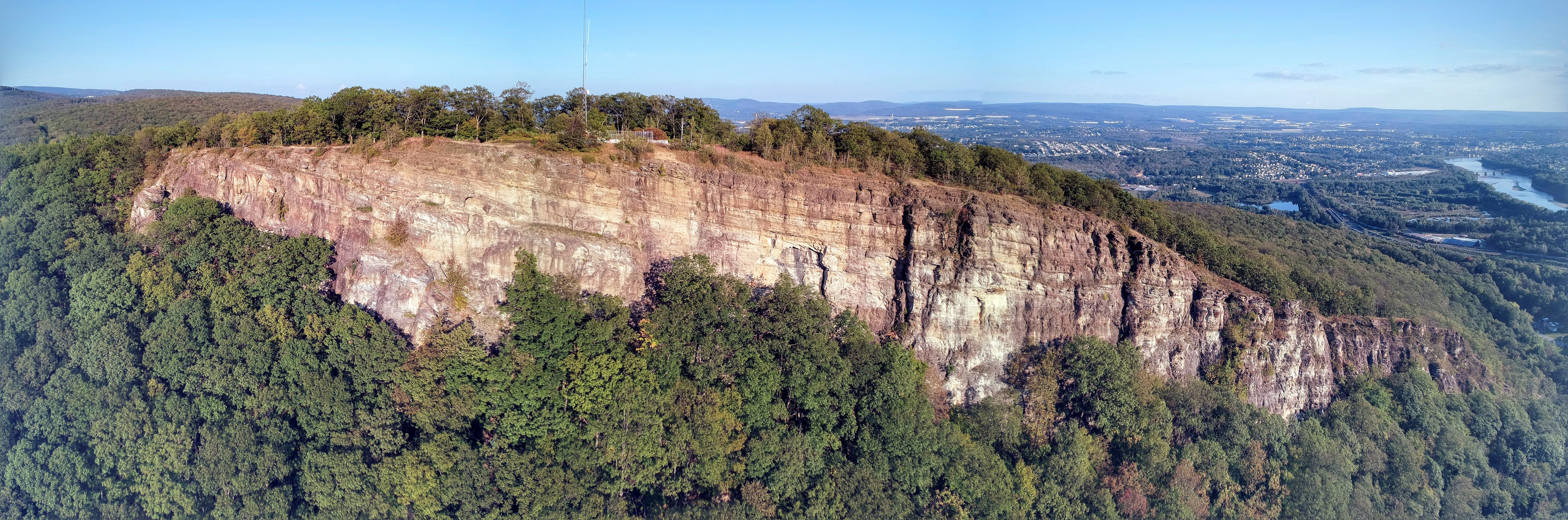
- Wilkes-Barre Hazleton Pittston West Pittston Penn Lake Park Ricketts Glen Campbell's Ledge

- Seal Logo

- Location of Luzerne County in Pennsylvania
- Interactive map of Luzerne County
- Country: United States
- State: Pennsylvania
- Region: Northeastern Pennsylvania
- Metro area: Wyoming Valley
- Formed: September 25, 1786
- Named for: Chevalier de la Luzerne
- County seat: Wilkes-Barre
- Largest city: Wilkes-Barre

Government
  - Type: Council–manager
  - Council: Members: • Jimmy Sabatino (D); • Brittany Stephenson (D); • Patty Krushnowski (D); • Joanna Bryn Smith (D); • Denise Williams (D); • Dawn Simmons (D); • Steven Coslett (D); • Chris Belles (D); • John Lombardo (R); • Lee Ann McDermott (R); • Harry Haas (R)
  - Council Chair: Jimmy Sabatino (D)
  - Manager: Romilda Crocamo

Area
  - Total: 906 sq mi (2,350 km^{2})
  - Land: 890 sq mi (2,300 km^{2})
  - Water: 16 sq mi (41 km^{2})
- Highest elevation: 2,460 ft (750 m)
- Lowest elevation: 512 ft (156 m)

Population (2020)
  - Total: 325,594
  - Estimate (2025): 332,126 ▲
  - Density: 370/sq mi (140/km^{2})
- Time zone: UTC−5 (EST)
  - Summer (DST): UTC−4 (EDT)
- Area codes: 570/272
- Website: www.luzernecounty.org

Luzerne County (Note: Pronounced /ləˈzɜːrn/ lə-ZURN) is a home rule county in the Commonwealth of Pennsylvania. According to the United States Census Bureau, the county has a total area of 906 square miles (2,350 km^{2}), of which 890 square miles (2,300 km^{2}) is land and 16 square miles (41 km^{2}) is water. It is Northeastern Pennsylvania's second-largest county by total area. As of the 2020 census, the population was 325,594, making it the most populous county in the northeastern part of the state. The county also features the largest economy in Northeastern Pennsylvania, generating a GDP of $20.58 billion.

Wilkes-Barre is Luzerne County's most populous city and county seat. Other populous communities include Hazleton, Kingston, Nanticoke, and Pittston. Luzerne County is included in the Scranton–Wilkes-Barre–Hazleton Metropolitan Statistical Area, which has a total population of 555,426 as of 2017.

On September 25, 1786, Luzerne County was formed from part of Northumberland County. It was named after Chevalier de la Luzerne, a French soldier and diplomat during the 18th century. When it was founded, Luzerne County occupied a large portion of Northeastern Pennsylvania. From 1810 to 1878, it was divided into several smaller counties. The counties of Bradford, Lackawanna, Susquehanna, and Wyoming were all formed from parts of Luzerne County.

The county gained prominence in the 19th and 20th centuries as an active anthracite coal mining region, drawing a large portion of its labor force from European immigrants. At its peak in 1930, the county's population was 445,109. Many factories and coal mines closed by the early 21st century. Like most regions in the Rust Belt, Luzerne County witnessed population loss and urban decay. However, in recent years, the economy has grown moderately; warehousing has replaced manufacturing as the main industry.

== History ==
=== 18th century ===
Map of Native American tribes in the region before the arrival of European settlers

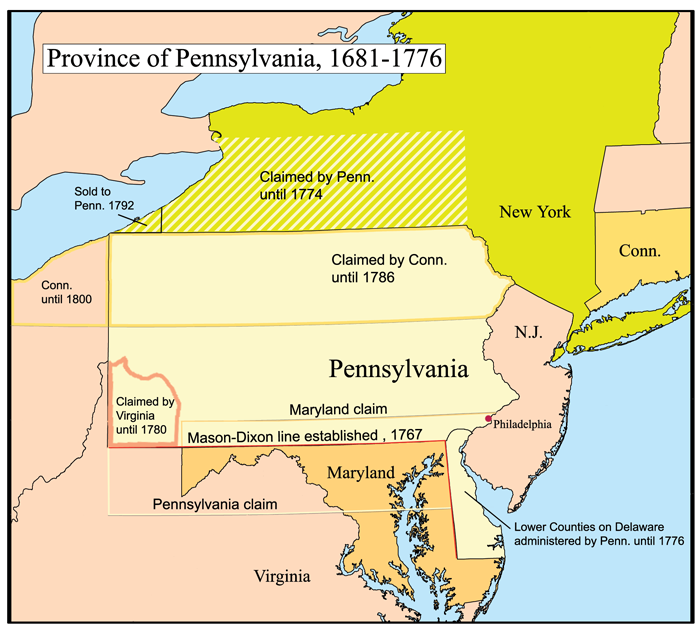
A 1776 map of the Province of Pennsylvania and competing land claims at the time

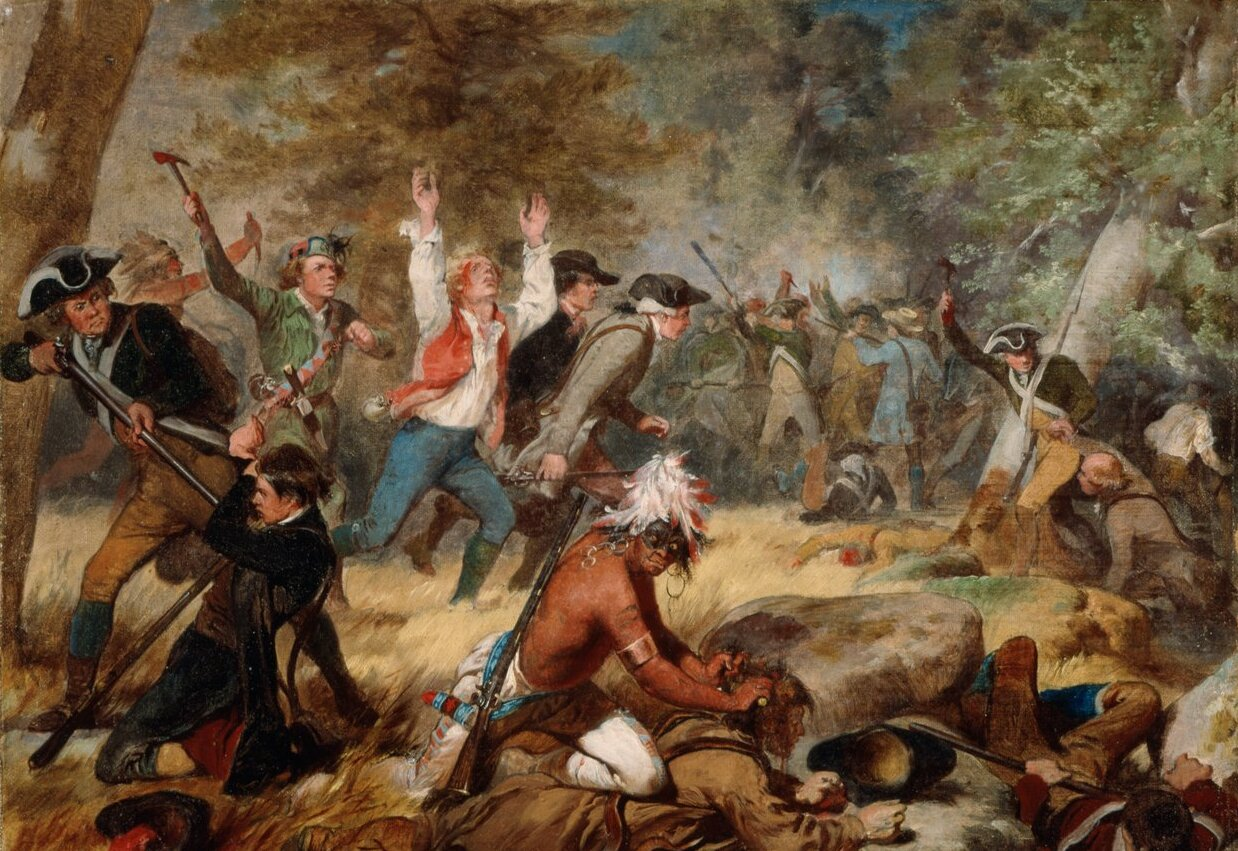
The July 3, 1778 Battle of Wyoming depicted in an 1858 painting by Alonzo Chappel

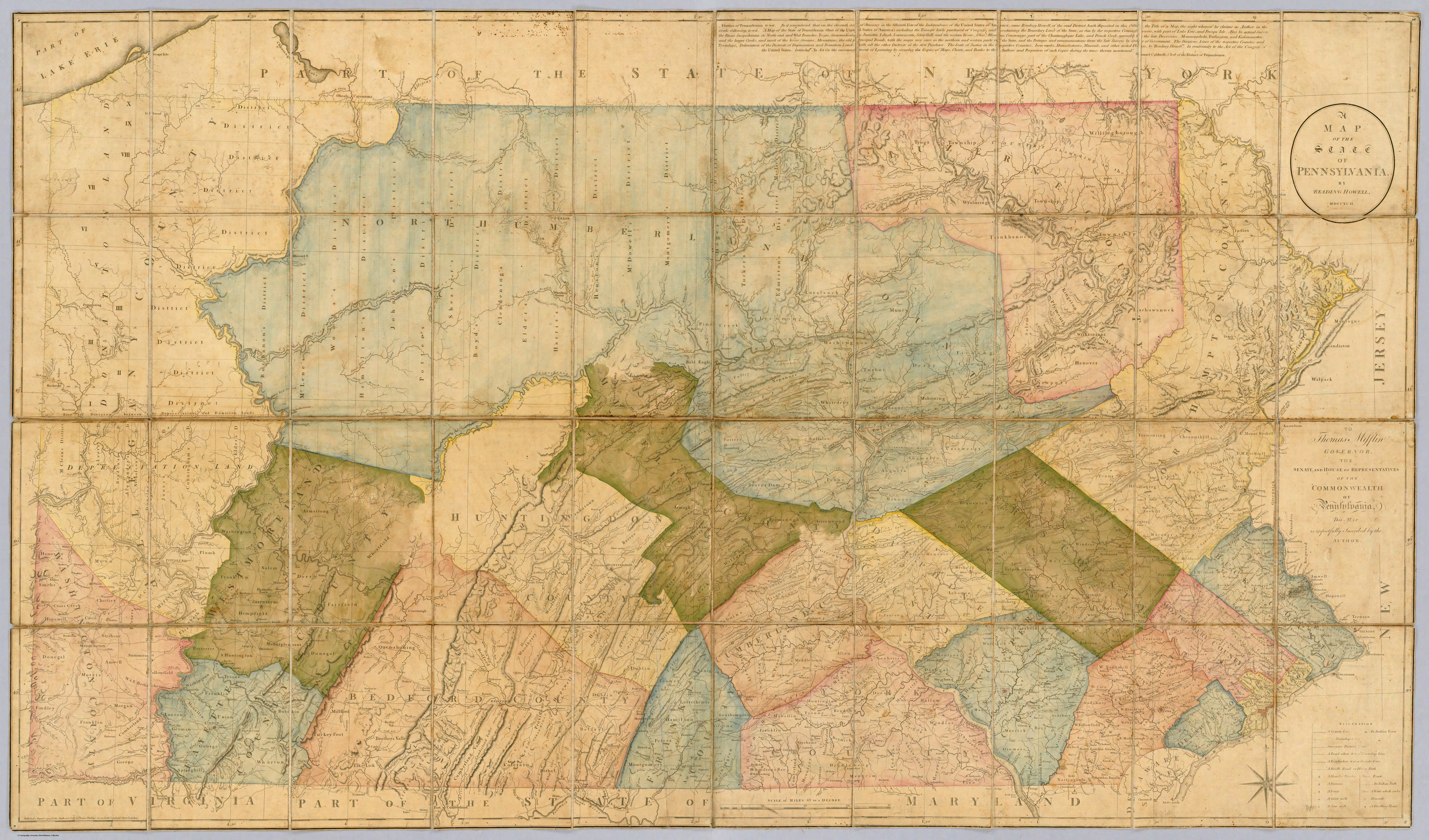
A 1792 map of Pennsylvania when Bradford, Lackawanna, Susquehanna, and Wyoming were still part of Luzerne County

Long an area occupied by indigenous peoples, by the 1700s the Wyoming Valley was inhabited by several Native American tribes including the Susquehannock, who spoke an Iroquoian language, and the Delaware (Lenape), who spoke an Algonquian language. In the mid-18th century, Connecticut settlers of primarily English ancestry ventured into the valley. These were the first recorded Europeans in the region. Some came as missionaries to the Native American peoples, while others came to farm the fertile land near the Susquehanna River. Ultimately, the violence of the French and Indian War (the North American front of the Seven Years' War between Great Britain and France) drove these Connecticut settlers away.

The British colonies of Pennsylvania and Connecticut both claimed the Wyoming Valley as their own. King Charles II of England had granted the land to the Connecticut Colony in 1662, but also to William Penn, the founder of Pennsylvania, in 1681. In 1769, Yankee settlers from Connecticut returned to the valley and founded the town of Wilkes-Barre. However, they were not alone. Pennsylvanian settlers (Pennamites) were also in the region.

Armed bands of Pennamites harassed the Connecticut settlers in what is known as the Pennamite-Yankee Wars. While the land dispute continued, a much larger conflict began. In 1775, the Thirteen Colonies began a war of independence against Great Britain. Residents of both Pennsylvania and Connecticut were largely loyal to the Patriot cause, which supported the American Revolution and independence.

On June 30, 1778, Loyalist forces, under the command of Major John Butler, arrived in the Wyoming Valley to attack the rebel American settlements. On July 1, Fort Wintermoot at the north end of the valley surrendered without a shot being fired. The next morning the smaller Fort Jenkins surrendered. Both forts were later burned to the ground.

The Patriot militia assembled at Forty Fort. On July 3, a column of roughly 360 men, including a company of soldiers from the Continental Army, marched from the fort under the command of Lieutenant Colonel Zebulon Butler and Colonel Nathan Denison. Butler's Rangers, with the assistance of about 500 Native American allies, mostly Seneca, ambushed the approaching Americans. In the end, 302 American soldiers were killed during the Battle of Wyoming. Today, in the Borough of Wyoming, a monument marks the gravesite of the victims from the battle.

The next day, Colonel Denison surrendered Forty Fort along with several other posts. Widespread looting and burning of buildings occurred throughout the Wyoming Valley subsequent to this capitulation, but non-combatants were not harmed. Most of the inhabitants, however, fled across the Pocono Mountains to Stroudsburg and Easton, or down the Susquehanna River to Sunbury.

In September 1778, American Colonel Thomas Hartley took partial revenge for the Wyoming defeat. He and his 200 soldiers burned a number of villages in Delaware along the Susquehanna River. The following year, Major General John Sullivan would lead several thousand men in a scorched-earth campaign against the Iroquois nations in central and western New York.

Two years later, in September 1780, reports of Iroquois and Loyalist activity in the region resulted in a detachment of 41 Patriot militia from Northampton County being sent to investigate. The detachment made it as far north as present-day Conyngham when they were ambushed by a party of Seneca and Loyalists. Ten men were killed in what is now known as the Sugarloaf Massacre.

==== Post-Revolutionary War ====
The American Revolutionary War ended three years later (in 1783) with the signing of the Treaty of Paris. Great Britain finally recognized the sovereignty of the United States of America. The land dispute between Pennsylvania and Connecticut continued after the war. Connecticut established its own county (by the name of Westmoreland) in the Wyoming Valley. However, Pennsylvania insisted that they owned the land. The Congress of the Confederation was asked to resolve the matter. With the Trenton Decree, on December 30, 1782, the confederation government officially decided that the region belonged to Pennsylvania; the Wyoming Valley became part of Northumberland County.

Pennsylvania ruled that the Connecticut settlers, also known as the Yankees, were not citizens of the Commonwealth. They could not vote and were ordered to give up their property claims. In May 1784, armed men from Pennsylvania force-marched the Connecticut settlers away from the valley. By November, the Yankees returned with a greater force. They captured and destroyed Fort Dickinson in Wilkes-Barre. With that victory, a new state (which was separate from both Connecticut and Pennsylvania) was proposed. The new state was to be named Westmoreland.

To ensure that they didn't lose the land, the Commonwealth of Pennsylvania worked out a compromise with the Connecticut (Yankee) settlers. The Yankee settlers would be allowed to become citizens of Pennsylvania and their property claims would be restored (as existing prior to the Decree of Trenton). As part of the compromise, Pennsylvania would establish a new county in Northeastern Pennsylvania. The Yankees agreed to the terms.

On September 25, 1786, the Pennsylvania General Assembly passed a resolution that created Luzerne County. It was formed from a section of Northumberland County and named after Chevalier de la Luzerne, a French soldier and diplomat to the American rebels and new government of the independent USA during the late 18th century. Wilkes-Barre was designated as the seat of government for the new territory. This resolution ended the idea of creating a new state. When it was founded, Luzerne County occupied a large portion of Northeastern Pennsylvania. The future counties of Bradford, Lackawanna, Susquehanna, and Wyoming were all part of the original Luzerne County.

In the following years, elections were held, the courts were established, a courthouse was constructed, and a government was formed. In 1787, Lord Butler was elected the first sheriff of Luzerne County. A board of commissioners was also assembled to manage the county government. Some of the first county commissioners included Jesse Fell, Alexander Johnson, John Phillips, John Jenkins, and Thomas Wright (from 1794 to 1796).

The population of the new county grew rapidly with new migrants. In 1790, fewer than 2,000 people resided within the Wyoming Valley. By 1800, the number of residents increased to nearly 13,000.

=== 19th century ===
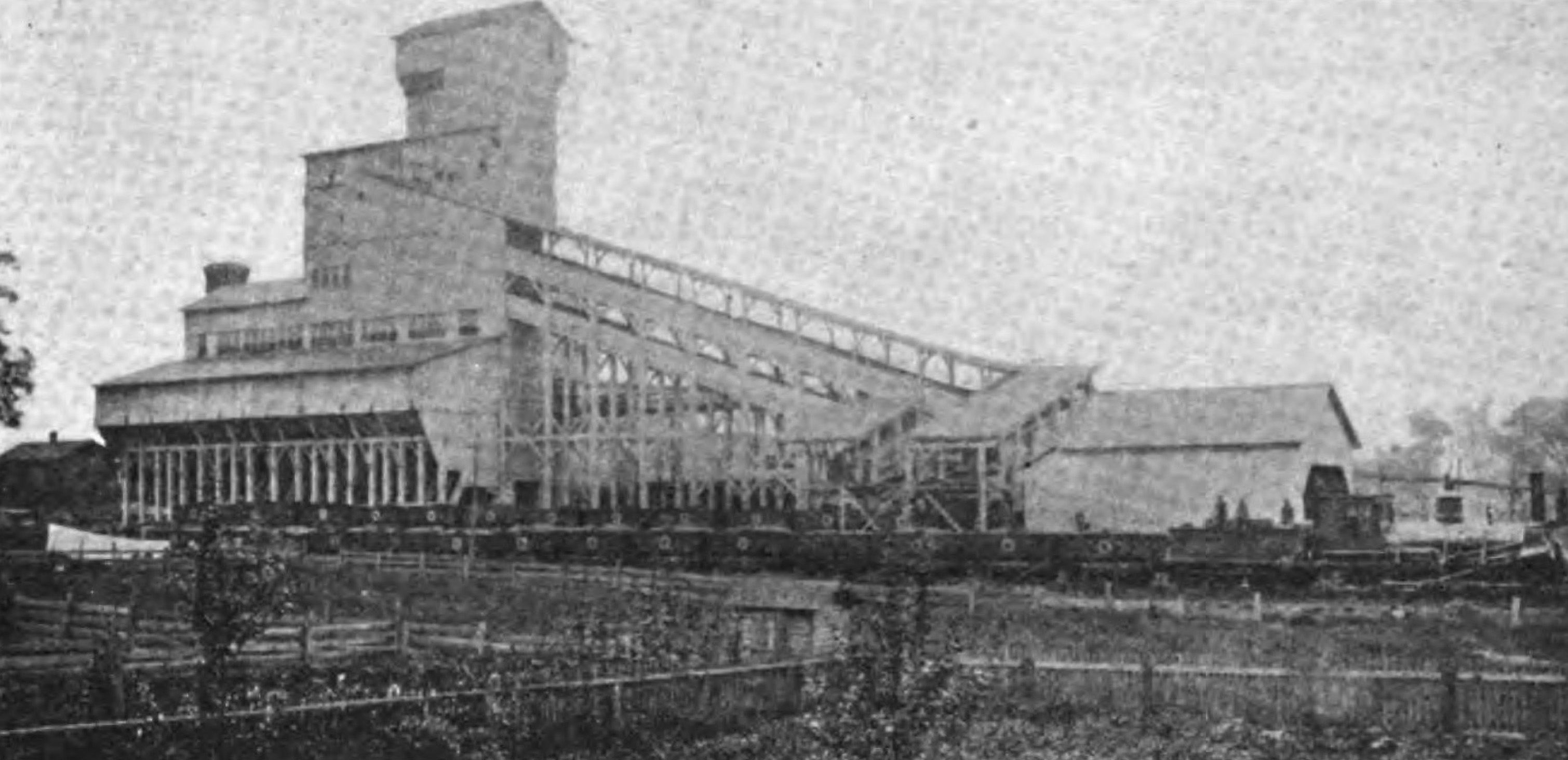
This coal breaker in Plymouth, built in 1869, was destroyed by fire 30 years later, in 1899.

Photo taken just before the Lattimer massacre on September 10, 1897

The county gained prominence in the 19th century as an active anthracite coal mining region. In 1791, German immigrant Philip Ginder stumbled across anthracite (or "hard coal") near Summit Hill. This resulted in the creation of the Lehigh Coal Mine Company. The company had a slow start because of the difficulty in igniting anthracite coal and the inability to transfer it to urban markets. In 1807, Brothers Abijah and John Smith were the first to successfully transport anthracite down the Susquehanna River on an ark. In 1808, Judge Jesse Fell of Wilkes-Barre discovered a solution to ignite anthracite with the usage of an iron grate; it allowed for the coal to light and burn easier. This invention increased the popularity of anthracite as a fuel source. This led to the expansion of the coal industry in Northeastern Pennsylvania. Throughout the 1800s, canals and railroads were constructed to aid in the mining and transportation of coal.

As the mining industry grew, a large region north of the Wyoming Valley, close to the Pennsylvania border with New York state, sought independence from Luzerne County. On February 21, 1810, the counties of Bradford, originally called Ontario, and Susquehanna were created from parts of Luzerne County. The two counties were officially formed in 1812. Thirty years later, on April 4, 1842, Wyoming County, the region in and around present-day Tunkhannock, was also formed from a section of Luzerne County.

The County of Luzerne witnessed a population boom as a result of the growing coal mining industry. Carbondale, with a population of nearly 5,000 residents, was incorporated as a city on March 15, 1851. Scranton, with a population of nearly 35,000, was incorporated as a city on April 23, 1866. And Wilkes-Barre, with a population of just over 10,000, was incorporated as a city in 1871. By 1875, anthracite coal from Luzerne County alone represented half the anthracite produced in the Commonwealth of Pennsylvania.

Since 1839, the people in and around the cities of Scranton and Carbondale sought independence from Luzerne County. Wilkes-Barre was determined to preserve the integrity of the county; it did not want to lose its assets in the region. Decades later, in the 1870s, residents of the proposed territory were allowed to vote for independent status. Voters favored a new county by a proportion of 6 to 1, with Scranton residents providing considerable support. Lackawanna County was finally created from a portion of Luzerne County in 1878.

Even through Luzerne County lost a vital region (the coal mining cities of Scranton and Carbondale), its boroughs and townships continued to grow. Hazleton (in 1891) and Pittston (in 1894) were both incorporated as cities due to their expanding populations. Thousands of European immigrants poured into Luzerne County due to the booming coal industry. The growing population quickly attracted the attention of factory owners in New York City and Philadelphia. Dozens of factories throughout Luzerne County were established to take advantage of the ever-increasing pool of available labor.

With an increasing population and the build-up of industry in the region, tragedies became more frequent in the second half of the 19th century. Sixteen people were killed – largely in factories – when a devastating F3 tornado struck Wilkes-Barre on August 19, 1890. It was the deadliest tornado in the county's history. The region's first significant mining disaster occurred on September 6, 1869, when a massive fire at the Avondale Colliery in Plymouth Township killed 110 people. Another consequential mining accident occurred on June 28, 1896, when the Newton Coal Company's Twin Shaft Mine in Pittston City caved-in and killed 58 miners.

Towards the end of the 19th century, labor unrest and union activity intensified in the region. Miners protested poor working conditions and unfair pay. This revved up tensions throughout the county. One of the most notable and deadly confrontations occurred on September 10, 1897 (near Hazleton). Luzerne County Sheriff James Martin formed a posse and fired on a group of unarmed striking miners in what is now known as the Lattimer massacre. Roughly nineteen people were killed and dozens more were wounded. Luzerne is infamous for being the last county whose sheriff legally formed a posse to restore order in a time of civil unrest.

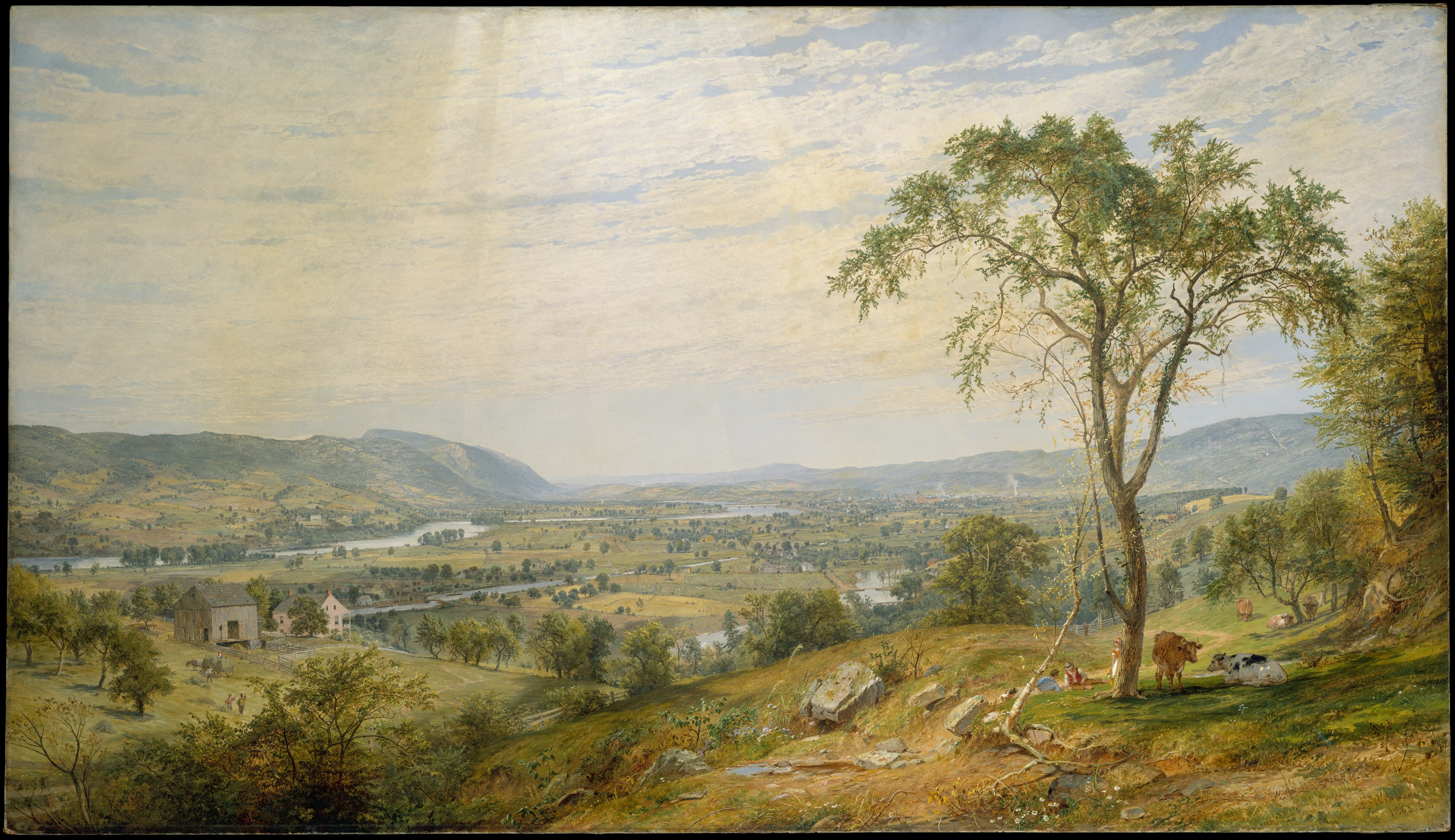
Wyoming Valley in the 1860s

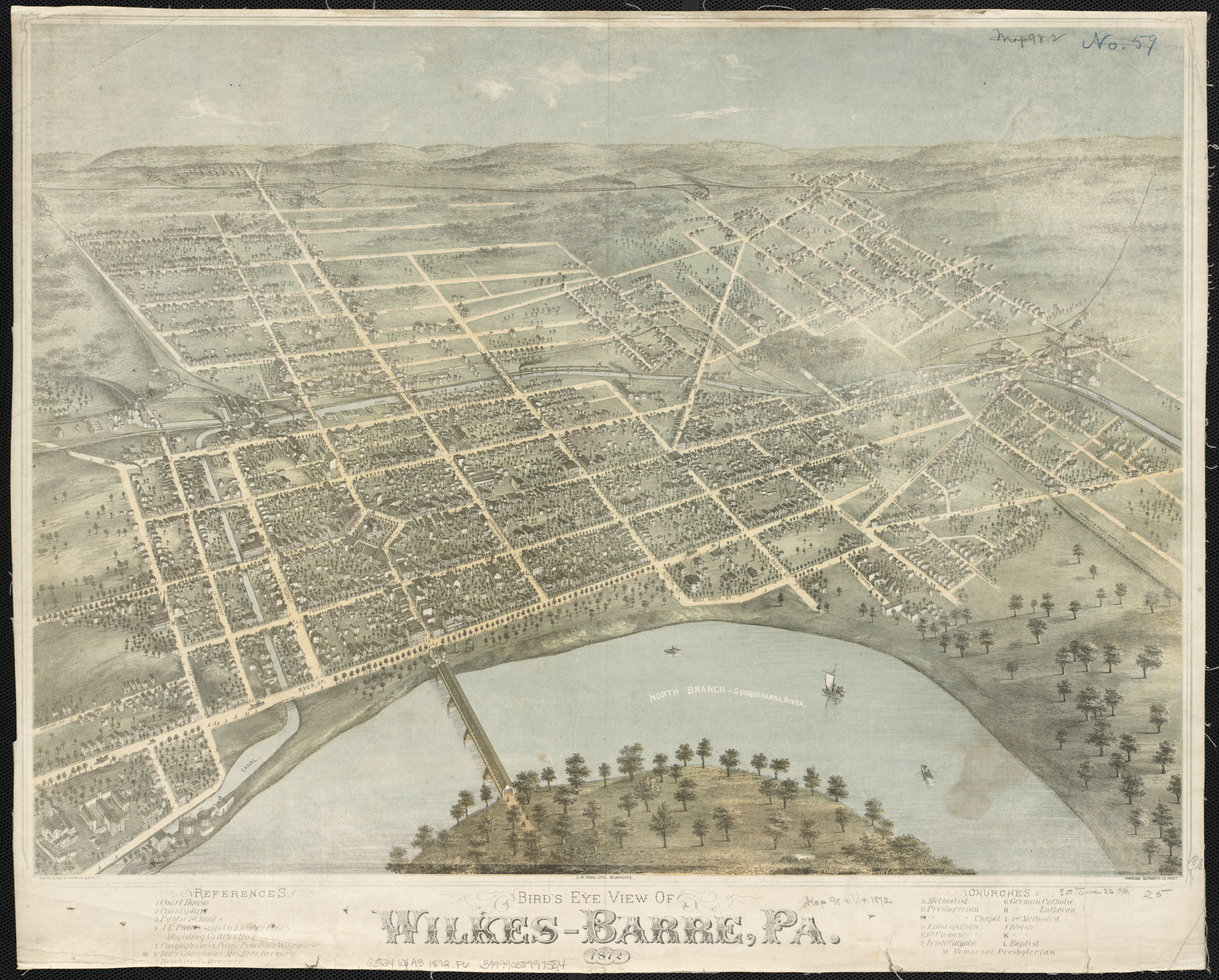
Wilkes-Barre in 1872

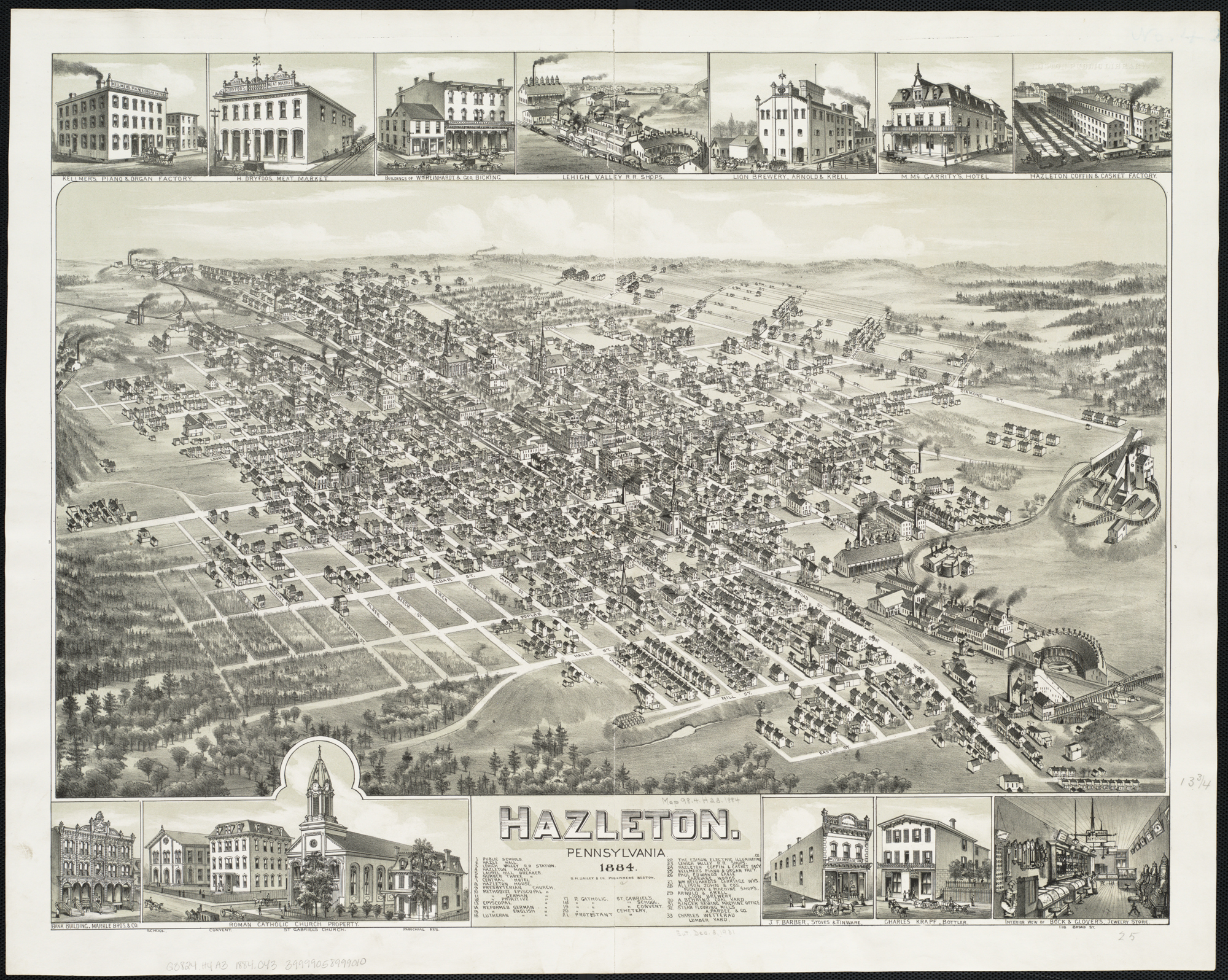
Hazleton in 1884

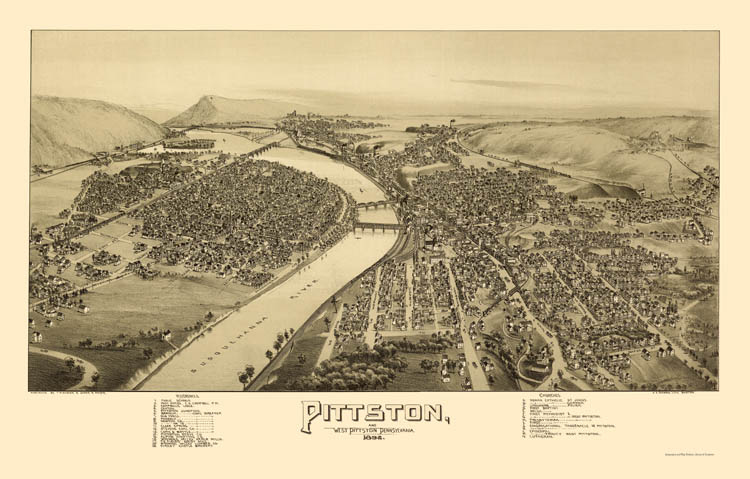
Pittston in 1892

=== 20th century ===
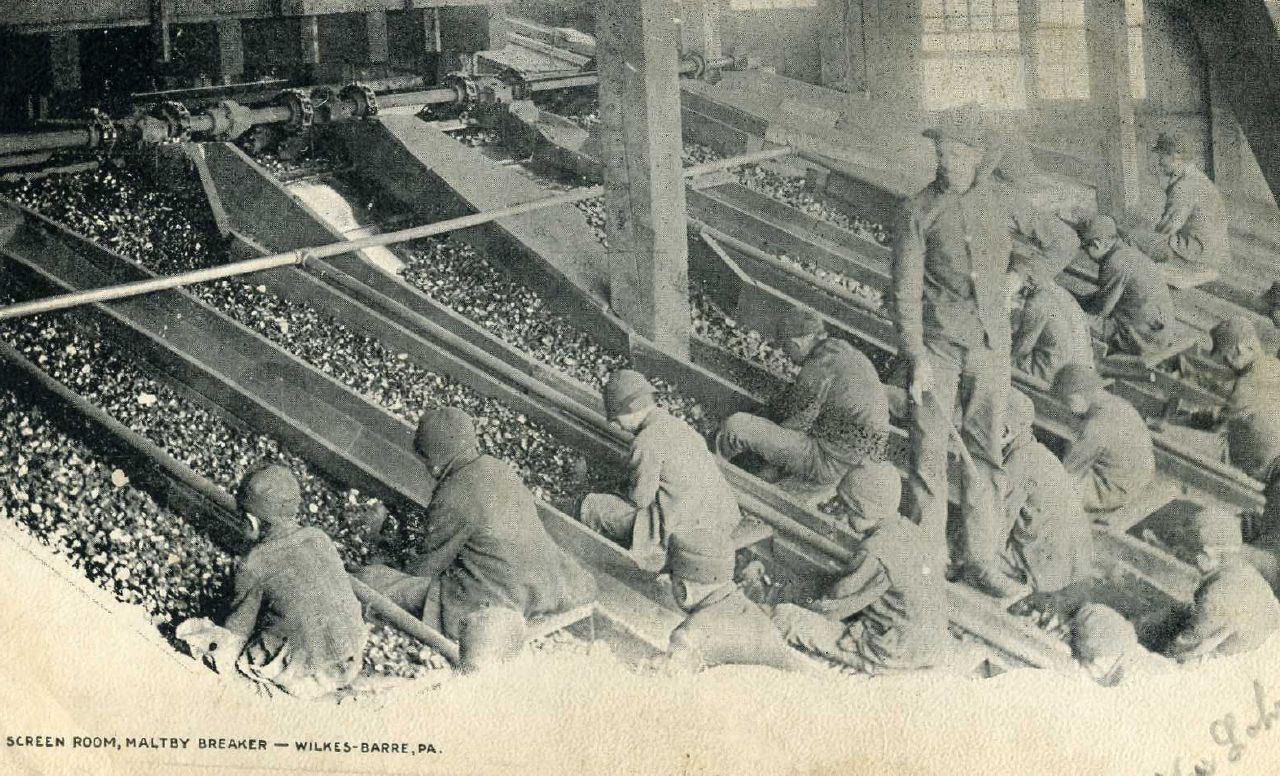
Children working in Wilkes-Barre coal mine in 1906

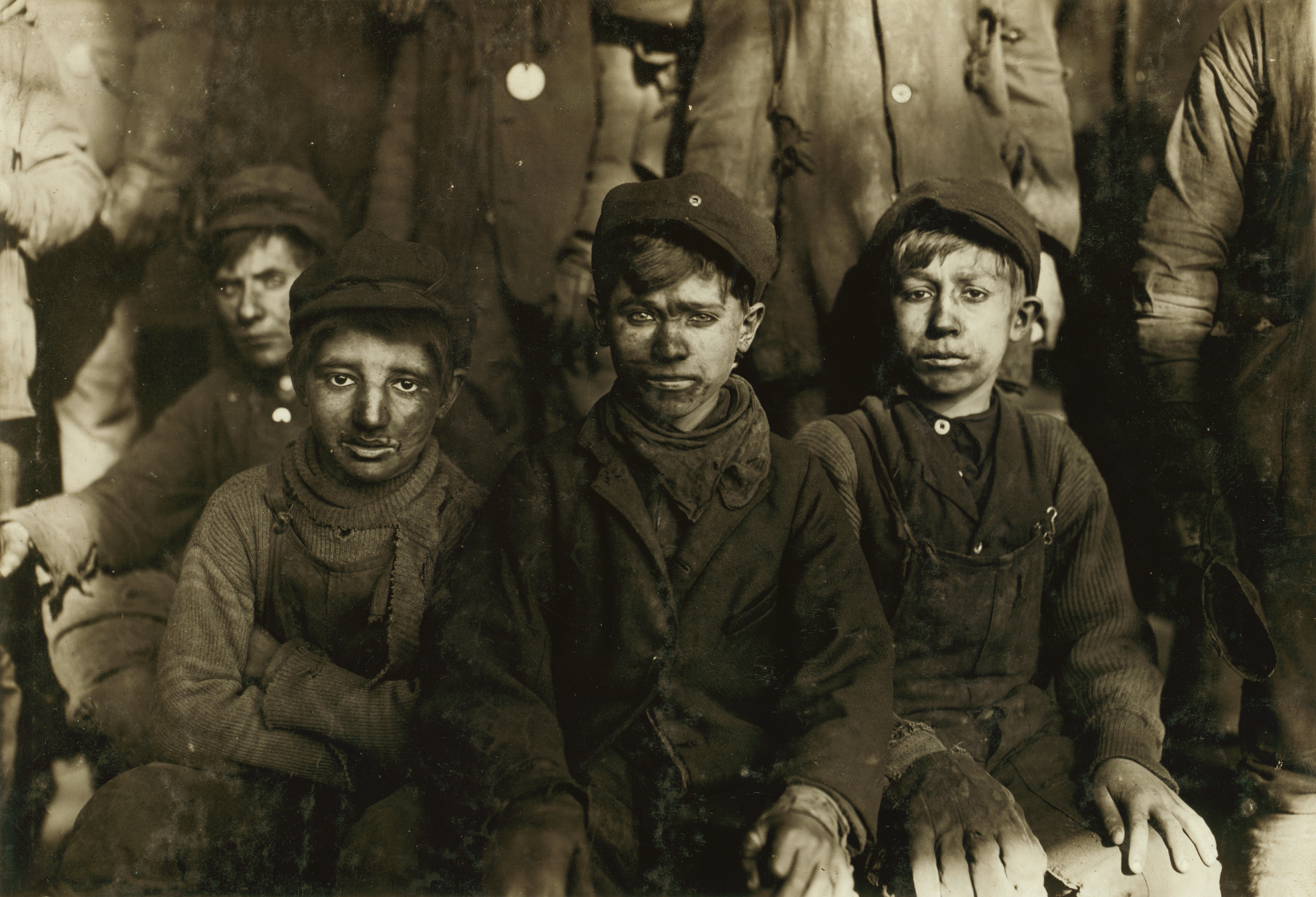
Breaker boys in Pittston in January 1911

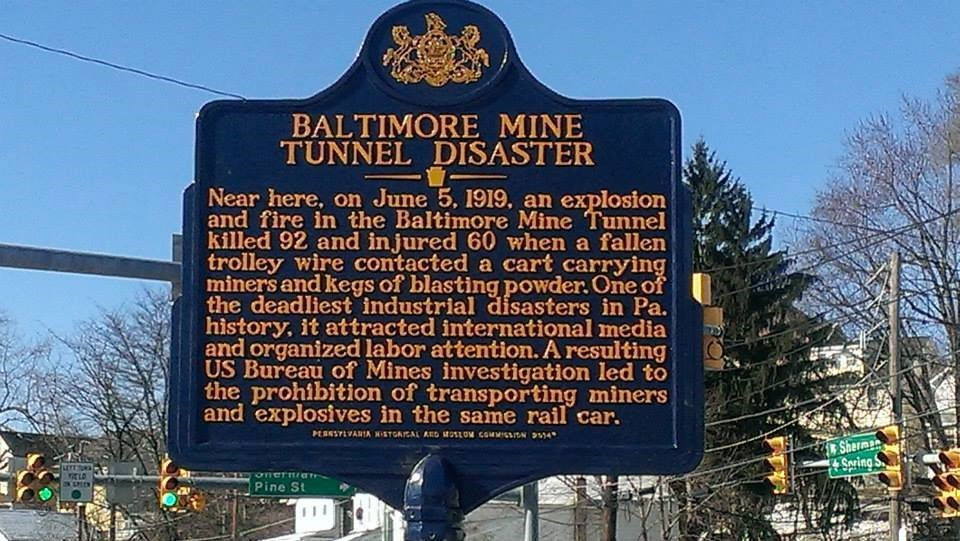
Historical marker of the June 5, 1919 Baltimore Mine Tunnel disaster in Wilkes-Barre

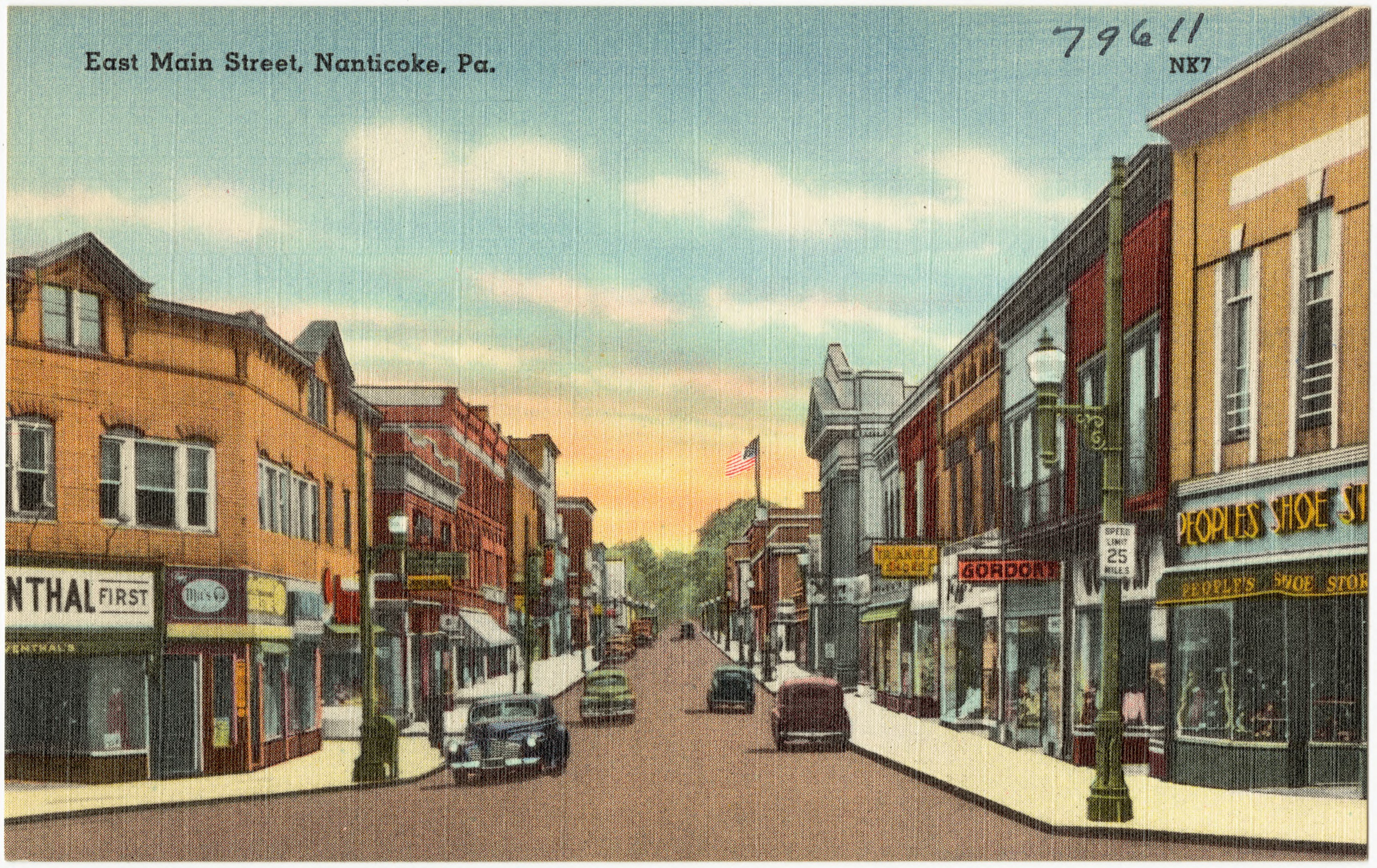
Nanticoke as depicted in a drawing from between 1930 and 1945

At the beginning of the 20th century, Luzerne County was in the midst of an economic boom. Industry, which included manufacturing and coal mining, drew thousands of immigrants (mostly from Europe) to the region. However, there were several drawbacks to the industrial boom. Labor unrest, mining accidents, and child labor were just a few problems facing the county. Labor disputes led to miners striking in the late 1800s and early 1900s. The Great Strike of 1902 gained national attention when it threatened to shut down the winter fuel supply for major U.S. cities. At that time, residences were typically heated with anthracite (or "hard coal"). The United Mine Workers of America protested for higher wages, shorter workdays, and the recognition of their union. President Theodore Roosevelt became involved and set up a fact-finding commission that suspended the strike. The strike never resumed, as the miners received a ten percent wage increase and reduced workdays (from ten to nine hours). It was the first labor dispute in which the U.S. federal government intervened as a neutral arbitrator.

Also, in the early 1900s, the anthracite coal mining industry – and its extensive use of child labor – was one of the industries targeted by the National Child Labor Committee and its hired photographer, Lewis Hine. Many of Hine's subjects were photographed in the mines and coal fields in and around Pittston and Wilkes-Barre. The impact of the Hine photographs led to the enactment of child labor laws across the country.

Despite the better working conditions, industrial accidents were still commonplace. On December 6, 1915, an underground mine fire started in the Red Ash Coal Mine near the communities of Laurel Run and Georgetown. Hundreds of residents living near the mine fire were later relocated. The fire continued to burn well into the 21st century. On June 5, 1919, another major mining accident occurred nearby. An explosion killed 92 miners at the Baltimore Colliery in Wilkes-Barre.

Regardless of the industrial setbacks, the region continued to grow economically. In 1906, construction began on a new county courthouse in Wilkes-Barre. Twenty years later (in 1926), Nanticoke, with a population of just over 22,000, was incorporated as a city. It was the last city established in the county. By 1930, the county's population peaked at 445,109. It was obvious that industry was the driving force behind the expanding population. From the 1930s to the 1980s, Pittston City emerged as a national center for clothing manufacturing. Thousands of workers, mainly women, labored in many factories throughout the Greater Pittston area. Most were members of the International Ladies' Garment Workers' Union (ILGWU). It advocated for higher wages, improvements in workplace health and safety, and employee rights. The ILGWU was active in civic and political life throughout Pennsylvania.

Railroad accidents were common throughout the United States in the 1800s and 1900s. On July 3, 1920, eighteen people were killed and thirty more were injured when three trains collided on the Lackawanna and Wyoming Valley Railroad, known as the Laurel Line, in the village of Sebastopol in Jenkins Township. In 1934, the right arm of Hughestown resident Harry Tompkins was crushed by an Erie Railroad train. This resulted in the U.S. Supreme Court case Erie Railroad Co. v. Tompkins, which laid the foundation for a large part of modern American civil procedure.

As the United States entered the age of mass air transportation, Scranton and Wilkes-Barre, the two largest cities in Northeast Pennsylvania, recognized the need for a large-scale airport. Despite the Great Depression and hard times affecting the local coal mining industry, a windfall multimillion-dollar opportunity to plan and build a regional airport was presented to the counties of Luzerne and Lackawanna through the federal government's Public Works Administration. It became apparent that a modern airport would be needed for the economic survival of the region. The site in and around Pittston Township was first surveyed in 1939 by the county commissioners of both counties.

In 1941, John B. McDade, president of the Heidelberg Coal Company and father of Congressman Joseph M. McDade, donated 122 acres on which part of the airport now sits. Most of the land was previously owned by various coal companies. By 1945, the two counties entered into a legal agreement to co-sponsor and operate the airport. Between 1945 and 1947, construction of the Wilkes-Barre/Scranton International Airport took place in and around Pittston Township. Today, the airport is known as the "Gateway to Northeastern Pennsylvania and the Pocono Mountains." It is the fifth busiest airport in Pennsylvania.

By the mid-20th century, anthracite production was declining at a steady rate. Consumers were gradually switching from coal to other forms of energy (e.g., oil, natural gas, and electricity). The Knox Mine Disaster was the final blow to the industry. On January 22, 1959, the Susquehanna River broke through the River Slope Mine in Port Griffith, Jenkins Township; it claimed the lives of twelve people. In the following months, two of the area's largest coal companies announced a full withdrawal from the anthracite business. Thousands of jobs were lost and the mining industry never recovered in Luzerne County.

The Wyoming Valley witnessed historical flooding from the Susquehanna River in the past. In June 1972, Hurricane Agnes devastated much of the Eastern Seaboard (including Pennsylvania). The Susquehanna River rose to 40.9 feet and breached the levees of several communities in the Wyoming Valley. In Wilkes-Barre, hundreds were trapped in their homes; nearly nine feet of water inundated Public Square. At the historic cemetery in Forty Fort, 2,000 caskets were washed away, leaving body parts on porches, roofs, and in basements. In Luzerne County alone, 25,000 homes and businesses were either damaged or destroyed. Losses in the county totaled $1 billion.

Luzerne County's economy was hit hard with the collapse of the mining industry and the devastating Agnes flood. To make matters worse, factories throughout the county were shutting down. They could not compete with lower labor costs elsewhere. By the end of the 20th century, Luzerne County was in the midst of a recession.

Following the Agnes flood (from the 1980s to 2000), two notable tragedies occurred in Luzerne County. The first took place on September 25, 1982, when George Banks killed thirteen people in a shooting rampage in Wilkes-Barre and Jenkins Township. The second incident took place on May 21, 2000, when a plane crash in Bear Creek Township (near the intersection of Bear Creek Boulevard – PA Route 115 – and the Northeast Extension of the Pennsylvania Turnpike) killed the pilot as well as all nineteen passengers.

=== 21st century ===
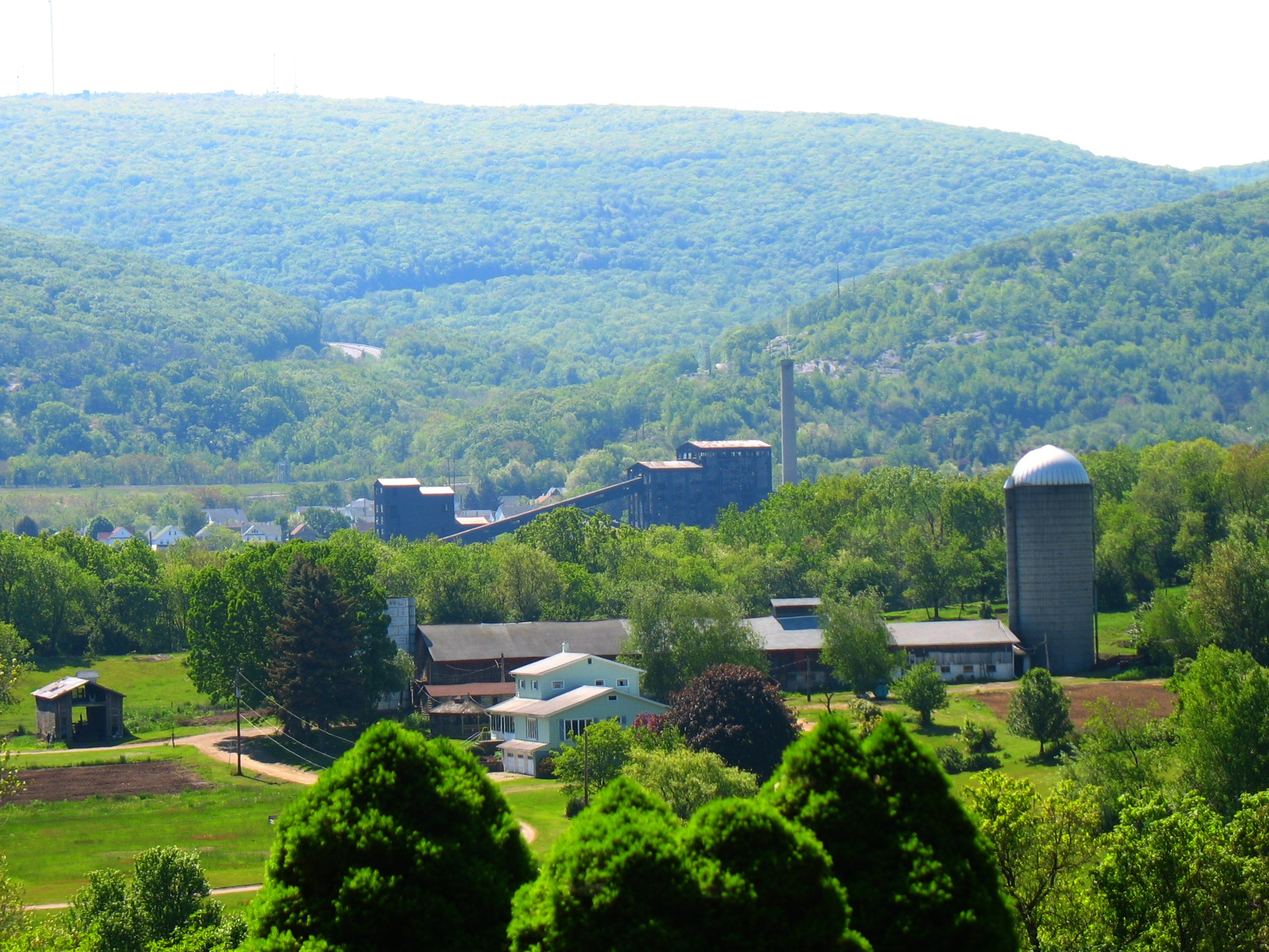
Ashley's abandoned Huber coal breaker in May 2008

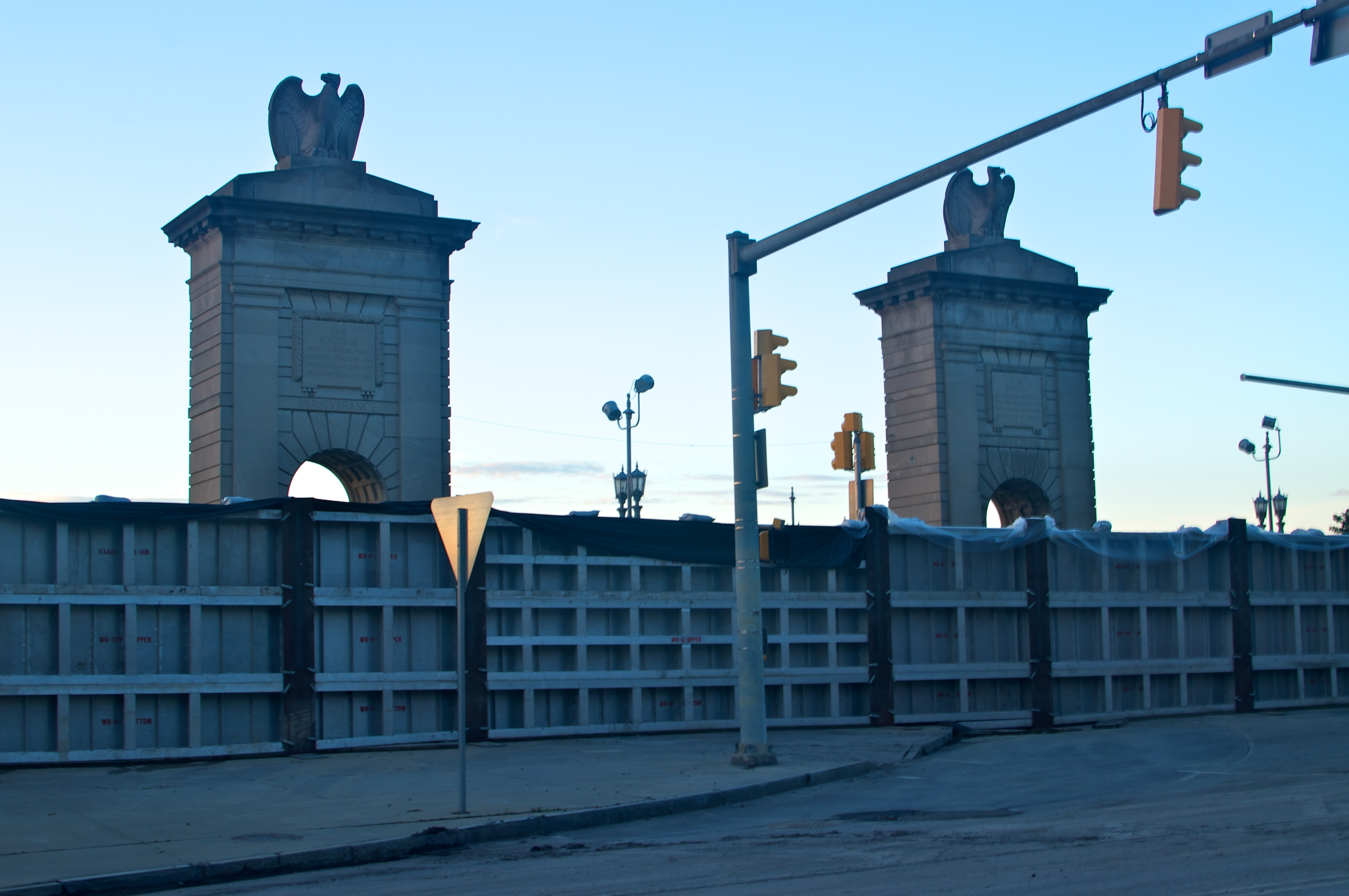
The levees and temporary flood walls that protected Wilkes-Barre from Tropical Storm Lee flooding in September 2011

Many factories and coal mines were long since closed by the turn of the 21st century. Like most regions in the Rust Belt, Luzerne County witnessed population loss and urban decay over many decades beginning in the mid-20th century. Luzerne County in particular had reached the apex of its population around 1930. However, despite continuing population loss in recent years, the economy has grown moderately; warehousing has replaced manufacturing as the main industry.

In the late 2000s, several scandals related to public corruption, cronyism, patronage hiring, and wasteful spending affected the county. The "kids for cash" scandal unfolded in 2008 over judicial kickbacks at the Luzerne County Court of Common Pleas in Wilkes-Barre. Two judges, Judge Mark Ciavarella and President Judge Michael Conahan, were convicted of accepting money from Robert Mericle, builder of two private, for-profit youth centers for the detention of juveniles, in return for contracting with the facilities and imposing harsh adjudications on juveniles brought before their courts to increase the number of residents in the centers. In the following years, additional county officials faced criminal charges (e.g., a clerk of courts, a deputy chief clerk, a director of human resources). County Commissioner Greg Skrepenak resigned in 2009; he was ultimately sentenced to prison for accepting money from a developer who received government-backed financing.

In May 2009, voters approved the creation of a government study commission. The commission proposed and wrote a home rule charter for Luzerne County. On November 2, 2010, the voters of Luzerne County held a referendum on the question of home rule. A total of 51,413 (55.25%) voted in favor of home rule, while another 41,639 (44.75%) voted against the move. The home rule charter would eliminate the positions of the three county commissioners; they would be replaced by an eleven-member county council (who will appoint and work alongside a county manager). This referendum "starts a new chapter in Luzerne County history," remarked James Haggerty, the chairman of the commission that wrote and proposed the charter. The first election for the new government was scheduled for 2011 – which ended up becoming an eventful year for Luzerne County.

From March to June of that year, the Borough of Duryea received national attention for its role in the landmark Supreme Court case Borough of Duryea v. Guarnieri, in which the court stated that "a government employer's allegedly retaliatory actions against an employee do not give rise to liability under the Petition Clause unless the employee's petition relates to a matter of public concern."

The second major event occurred in September 2011, when Luzerne County witnessed historical flooding from Tropical Storm Lee. The Susquehanna River reached a record high of 42.6 feet (13.0 meters) in Wilkes-Barre. The river topped the 40.9-foot (12.5-meter) level in flooding caused by Hurricane Agnes in 1972. However, unlike 1972, the levee system in Wilkes-Barre and several other communities held. Those municipalities without a levee system witnessed severe flooding.

The first general election for Luzerne County Council was held on November 8, making it the third and final consequential event of 2011. In the end, six Democrats, four Republicans, and one independent politician were elected.

The home rule charter took effect on January 2, 2012. The Luzerne County Board of Commissioners was abolished and replaced with the new form of government (council–manager government). The last three commissioners were Chairwoman Maryanne Petrilla, Stephen A. Urban, and Thomas Cooney. The first eleven council members were sworn in that same day. According to the charter, the council chair is "recognized as head of the county government for ceremonial purposes." The first council chair was Jim Bobeck. During the first council meeting, Tom Pribula was appointed interim county manager. Several weeks later, the council officially appointed the first permanent manager (Robert Lawton).

During the 2019 county council election, Republicans secured a majority on the county's governing board for the first time since 1989.

== Geography ==
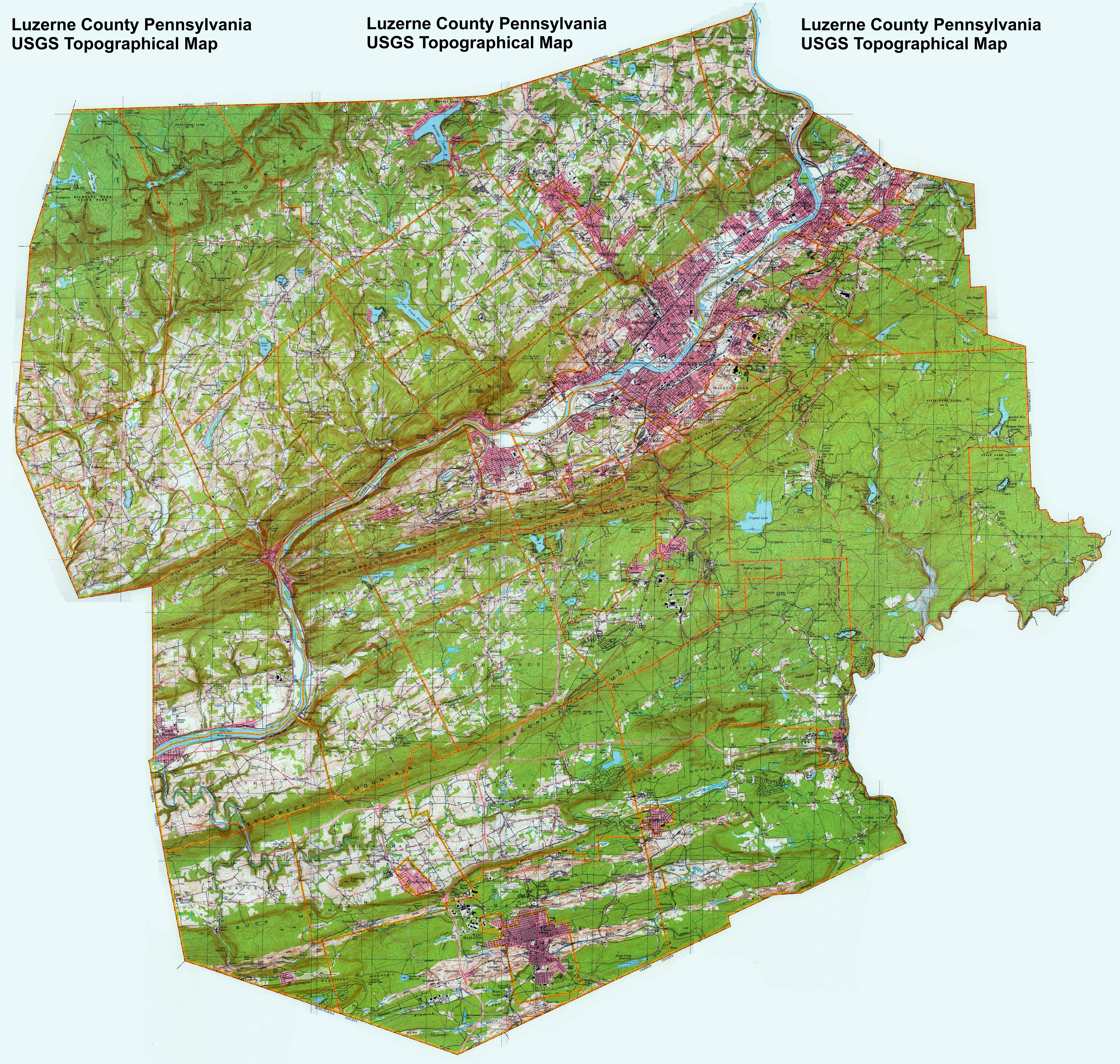
A topographical map of Luzerne County

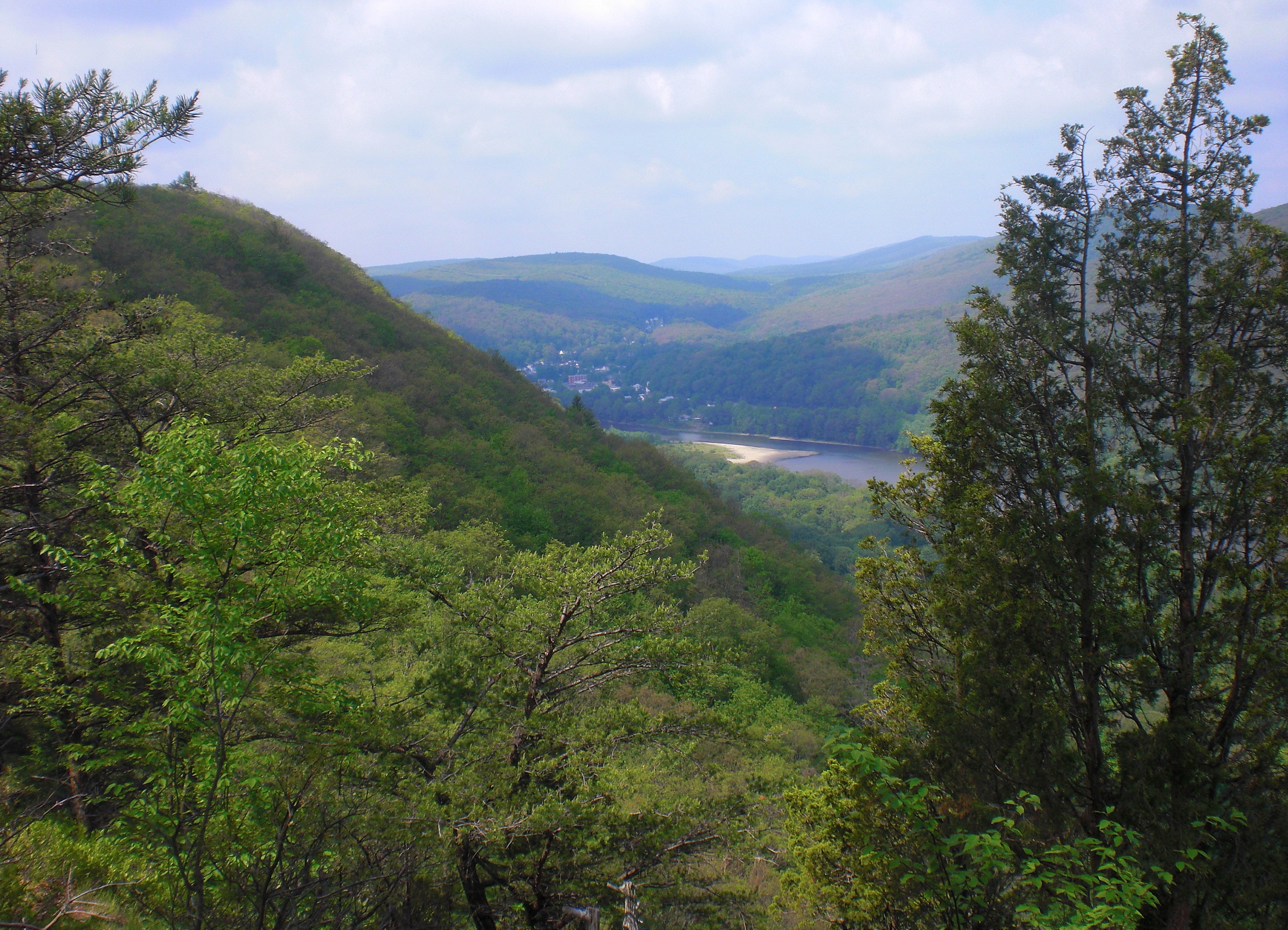
The Susquehanna River from the Mocanaqua Loop Trail in Conyngham Township in February 2008

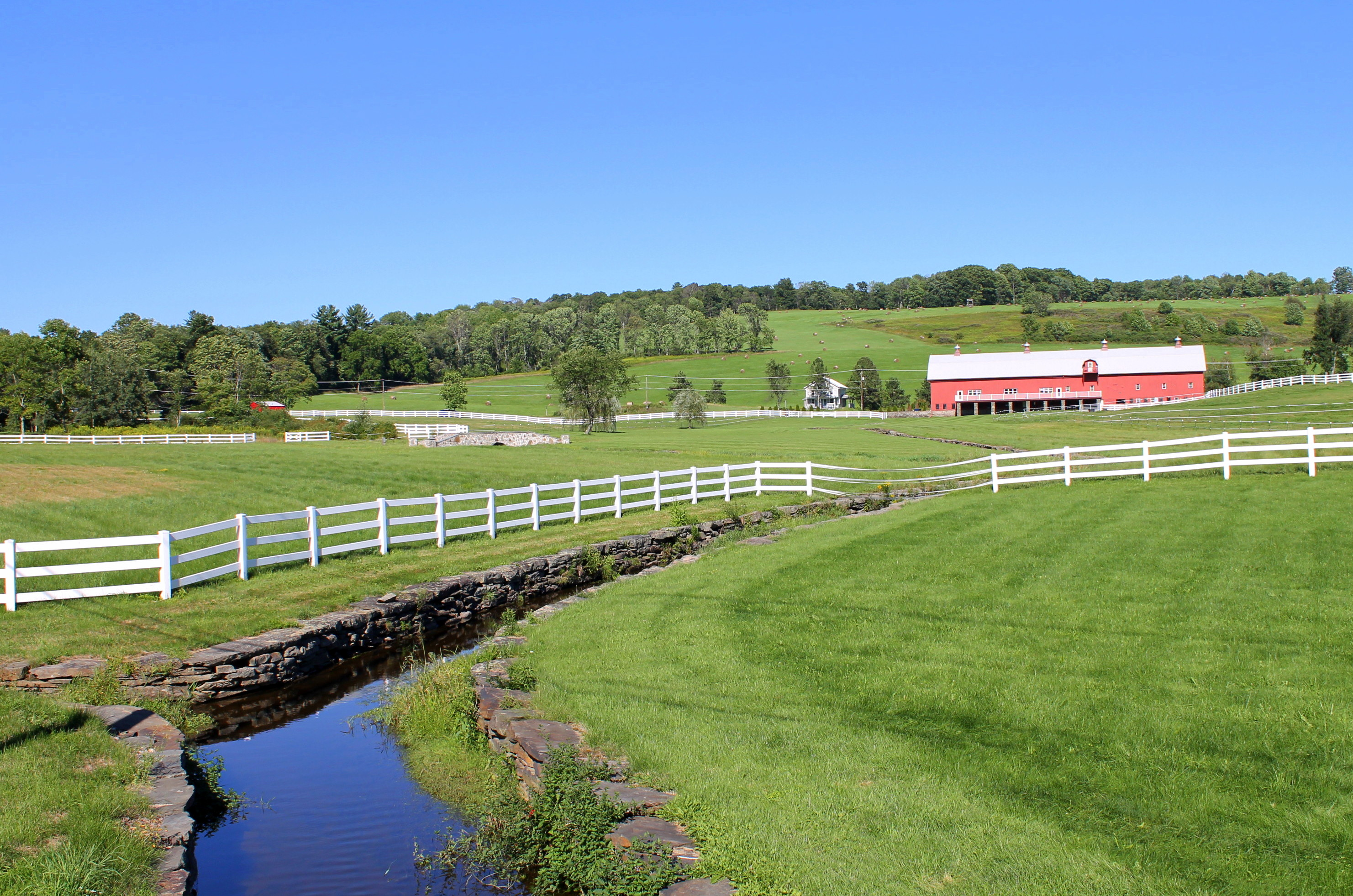
Dallas Township in August 2016

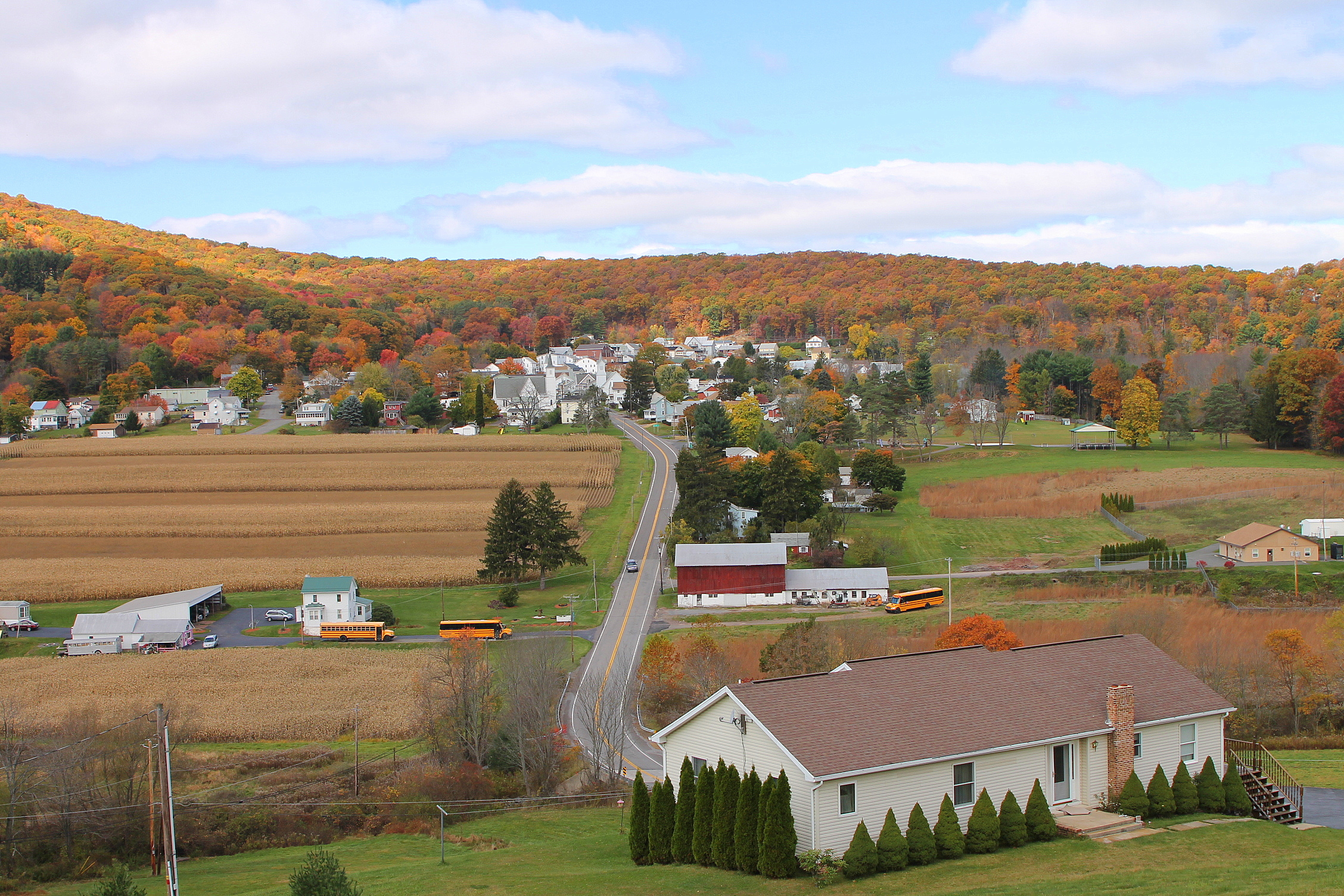
Nuremberg in October 2014

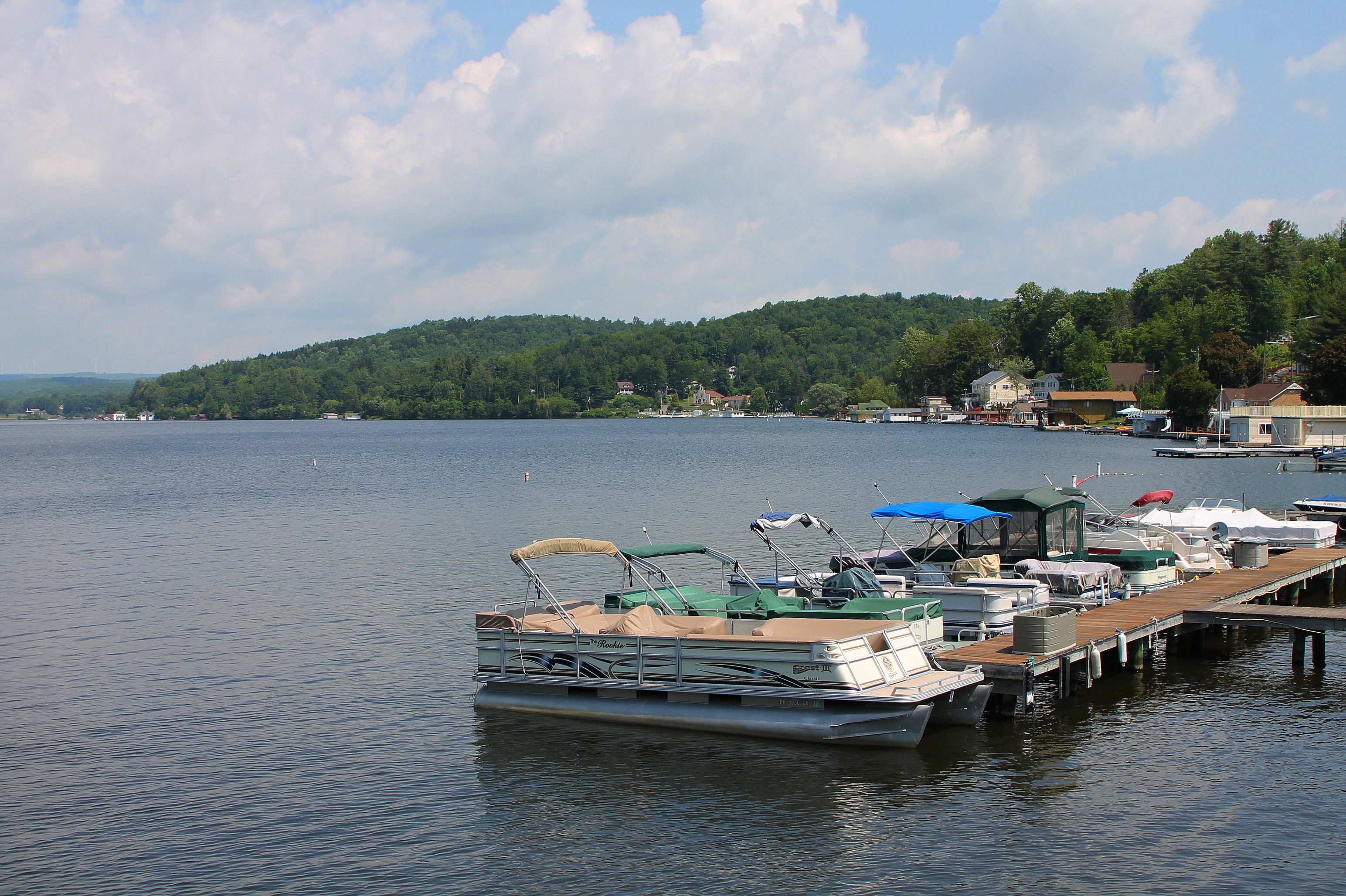
Harveys Lake in June 2015

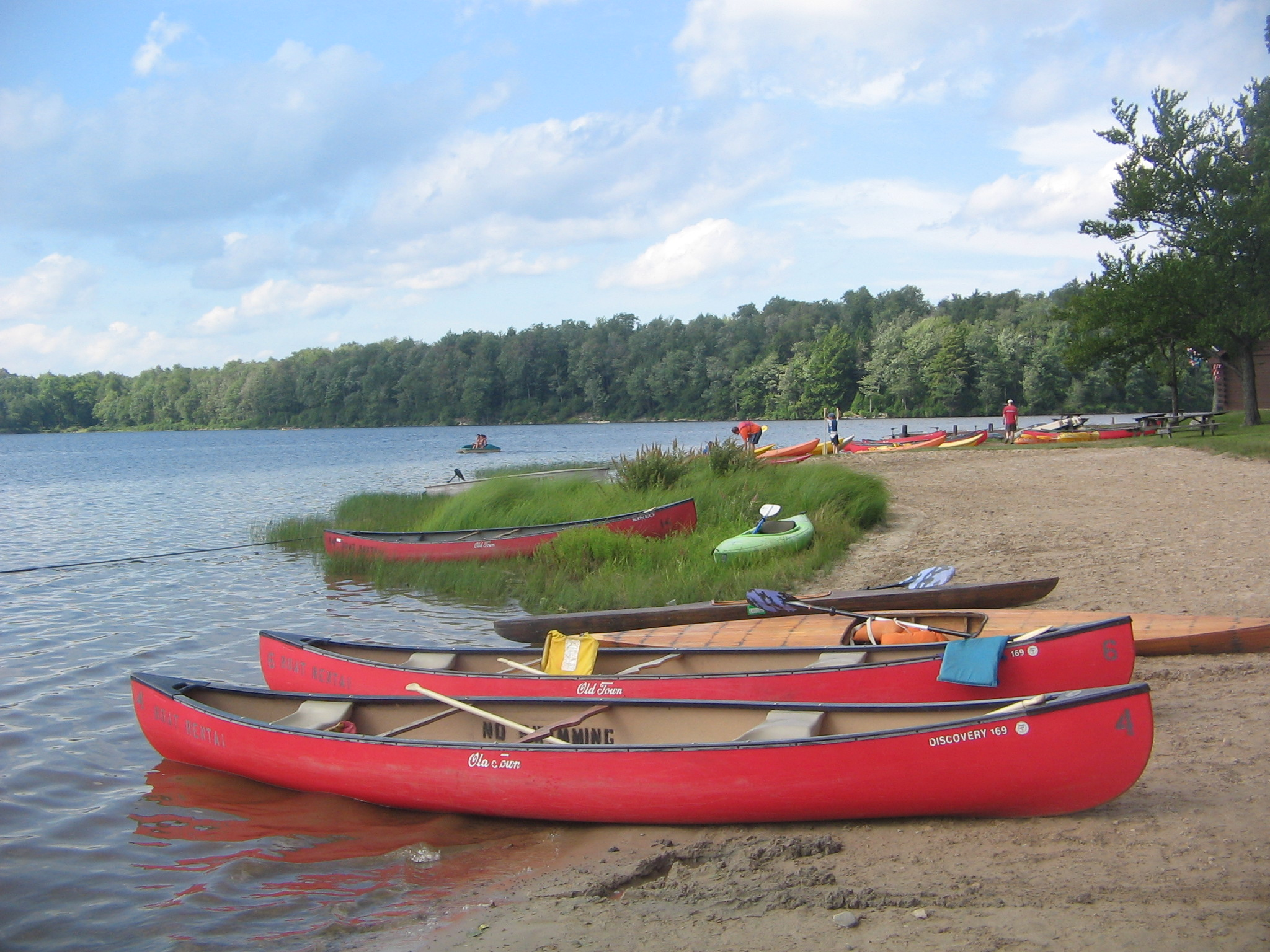
Canoes on the shores of Lake Jean in Ricketts Glen State Park, July 2010

According to the U.S. Census Bureau, the county has a total area of 906 square miles (2,350 km^{2}), of which 890 square miles (2,300 km^{2}) is land and 16 square miles (41 km^{2}), or 1.8%, is water. The highest point in the county is Cherry Ridge in Fairmount Township. The ridge is 2,460 feet (750 m) above sea level. The lowest point, of about 512 feet (156 m), can be found near Shickshinny.

Luzerne County consists of 76 independently governing municipalities (which includes 4 cities, 36 boroughs, and 36 townships). Wilkes-Barre is the largest city; it has a total area of 7.2 square miles (19 km^{2}). Pittston, with a total area of 1.7 square miles (4.4 km^{2}), is the smallest city. Harveys Lake is the largest borough; it has a total area of 6.2 square miles (16 km^{2}). Jeddo, with a total area of 0.3 square miles (0.78 km^{2}), is the smallest borough. Bear Creek is the largest township; it has a total area of 67.8 square miles (176 km^{2}). Wilkes-Barre Township, with a total area of 2.9 square miles (7.5 km^{2}), is the smallest.

The Wyoming Valley, also referred to as the Anthracite Valley Section of Pennsylvania, runs directly through Luzerne County. It extends from the northeastern border (with Lackawanna County) to the western border (with Columbia County). The valley is flat (at the Susquehanna Basin) and rises from 512 to 2,000 feet (156 to 610 m) in some places. Bear Creek, on the eastern side of the valley, has a mean elevation of about 2,000 feet (610 m), while Shickshinny, on the Susquehanna Basin, is about 512 feet (156 m). The county is crossed by a series of east-to-west mountains (e.g., Buck Mountain, Nescopeck Mountain, Penobscot Knob, and Red Rock Mountain). They are all part of the Appalachian Mountain Range.

The Susquehanna River is the largest river in the county. There are several islands located within the river; for example, Scovell Island (near Pittston), Monocanock Island (near Wyoming), and Richard Island (near Wilkes-Barre). The Susquehanna drains most of the county (including Bowman Creek, Huntington Creek, the Lackawanna River, Nescopeck Creek, Solomon Creek, and many other streams). The Lehigh River, which forms part of Luzerne County's southeastern border, drains the easternmost region. Dozens of lakes and ponds are also scattered throughout the county (e.g., Harveys Lake, Lake Jean, Lake Louise, and Long Pond).

Luzerne County consists of several urban areas. The first is a contiguous quilt-work of former anthracite coal mining communities (including the cities of Pittston, Wilkes-Barre, and Nanticoke). It is located in the northeastern and central part of the county (in the Wyoming Valley). The second is Greater Hazleton and it is located in the southern portion of the county. Other urban areas include the Back Mountain (in northern Luzerne County) and Mountain Top (between Wilkes-Barre and Hazleton). Thick forests and small farming communities are located just outside the urban centers.

=== State parks and forests ===
- There are four state parks in Luzerne County:
  - Frances Slocum State Park (northern Luzerne County)
  - Lehigh Gorge State Park (eastern Luzerne County)
  - Nescopeck State Park (southern Luzerne County)
  - Ricketts Glen State Park (western Luzerne County)
- There are two state forests in Luzerne County:
  - Pinchot State Forest, which includes Moon Lake Park and Seven Tubs Recreation Area
  - Weiser State Forest
- Other recreational areas:
  - Bear Creek Camp Conservation Area
  - Lehigh Gorge Trail
  - Susquehanna Warrior Trail

=== Adjacent counties ===
- Wyoming County (north)
- Lackawanna County (northeast)
- Monroe County (east)
- Carbon County (southeast)
- Schuylkill County (south)
- Columbia County (west)
- Sullivan County (northwest)
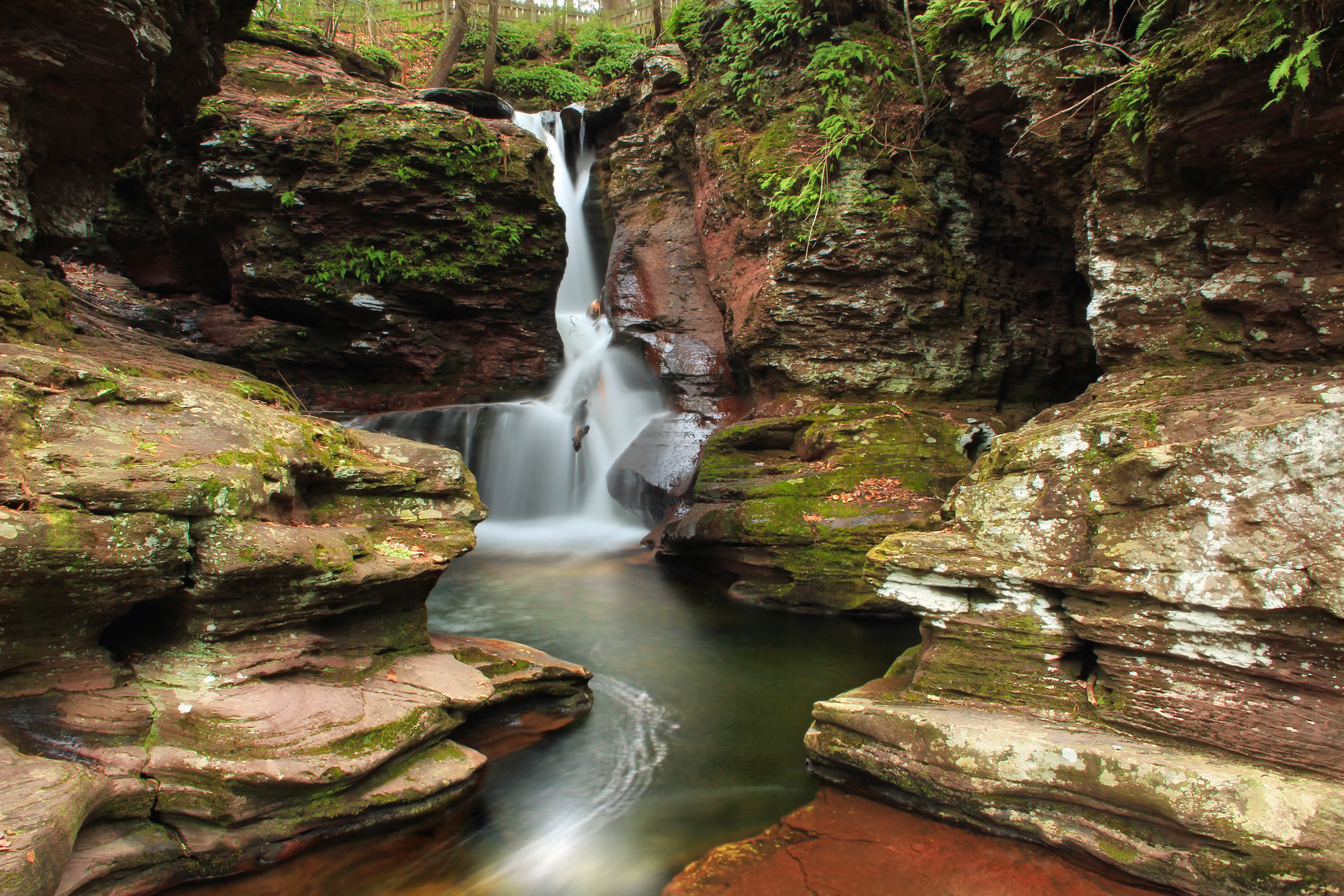
Adams Falls, Ricketts Glen State Park

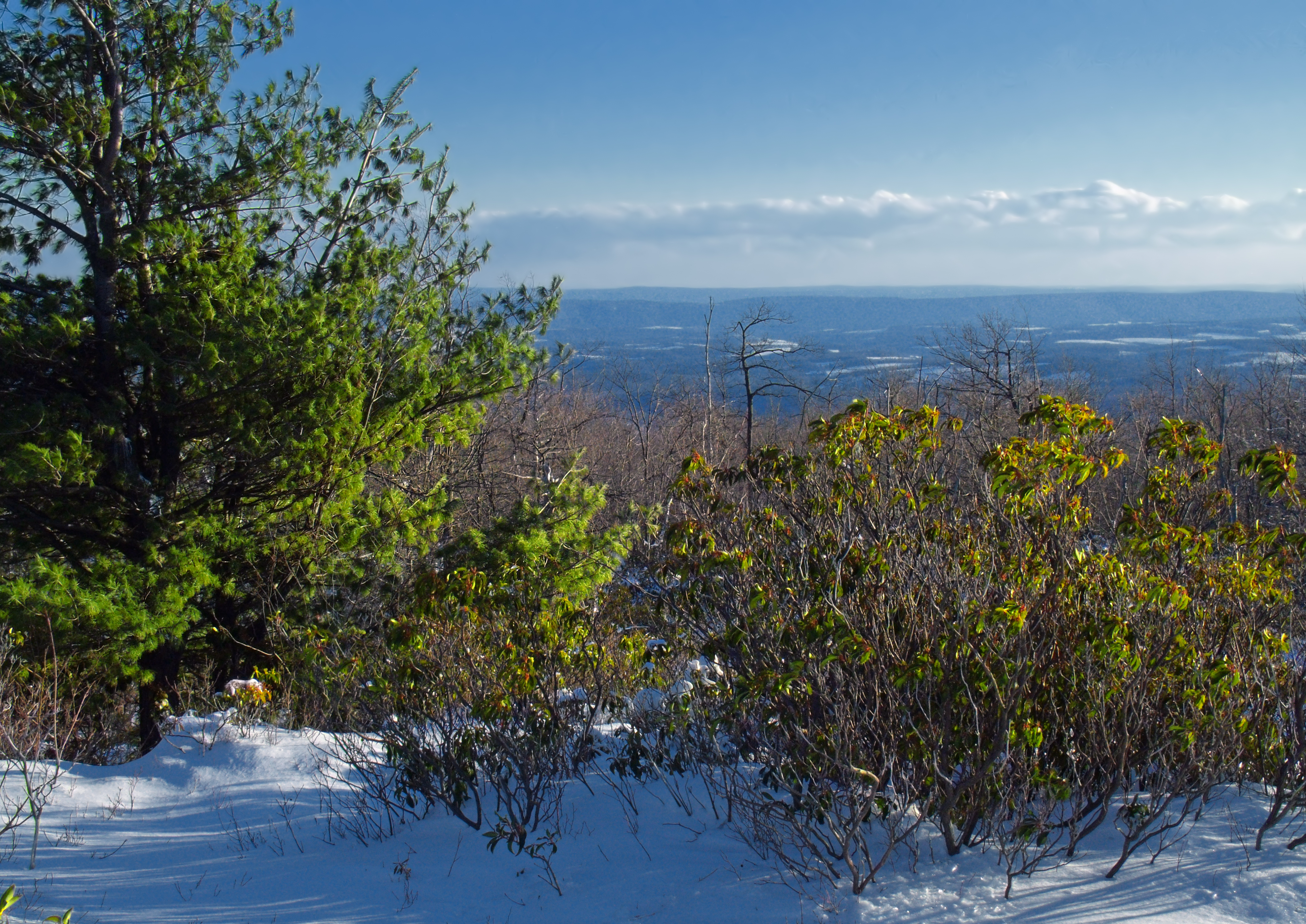
Grand View Trail, Ricketts Glen State Park

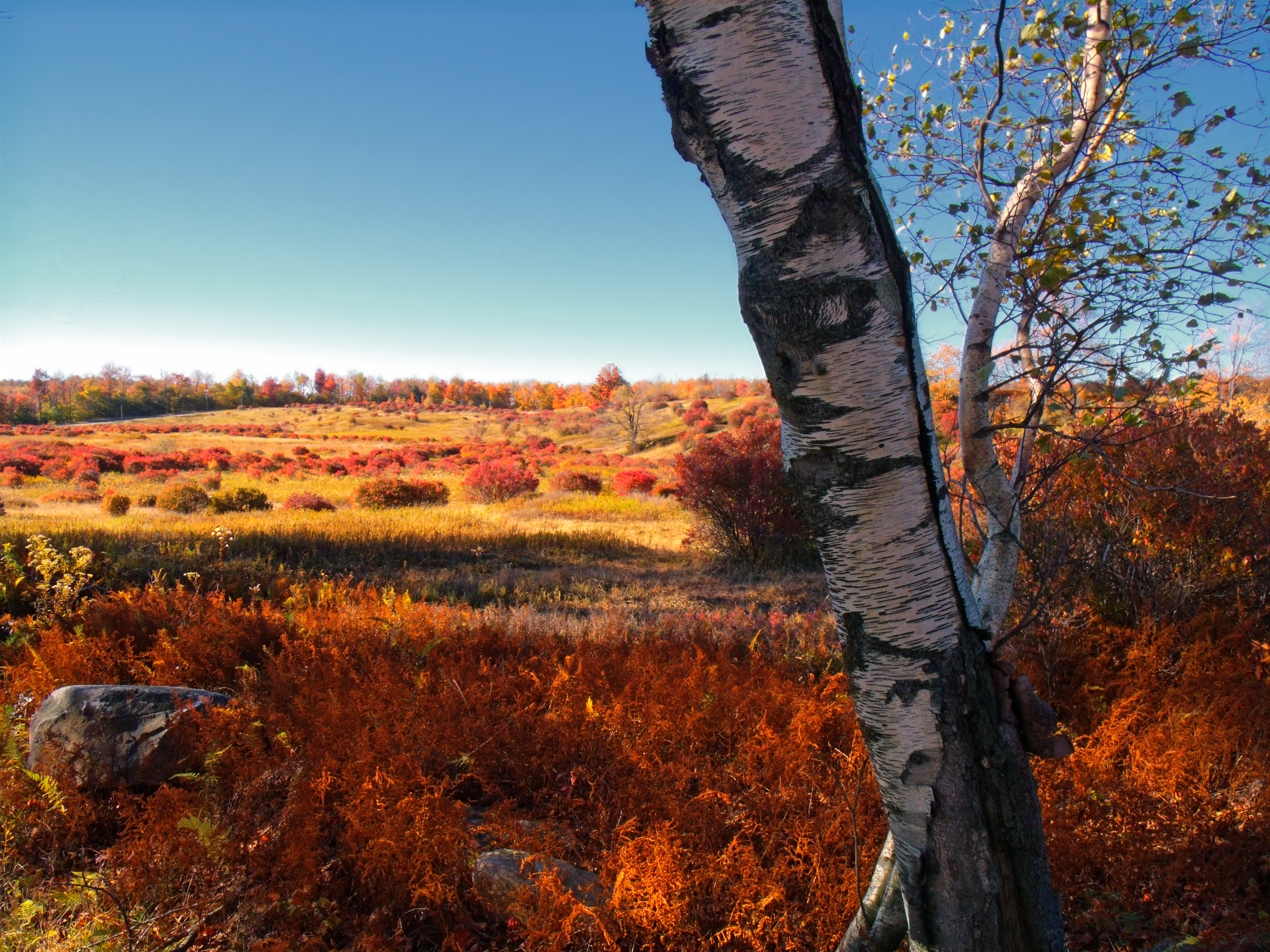
Hayfields, Ricketts Glen State Park

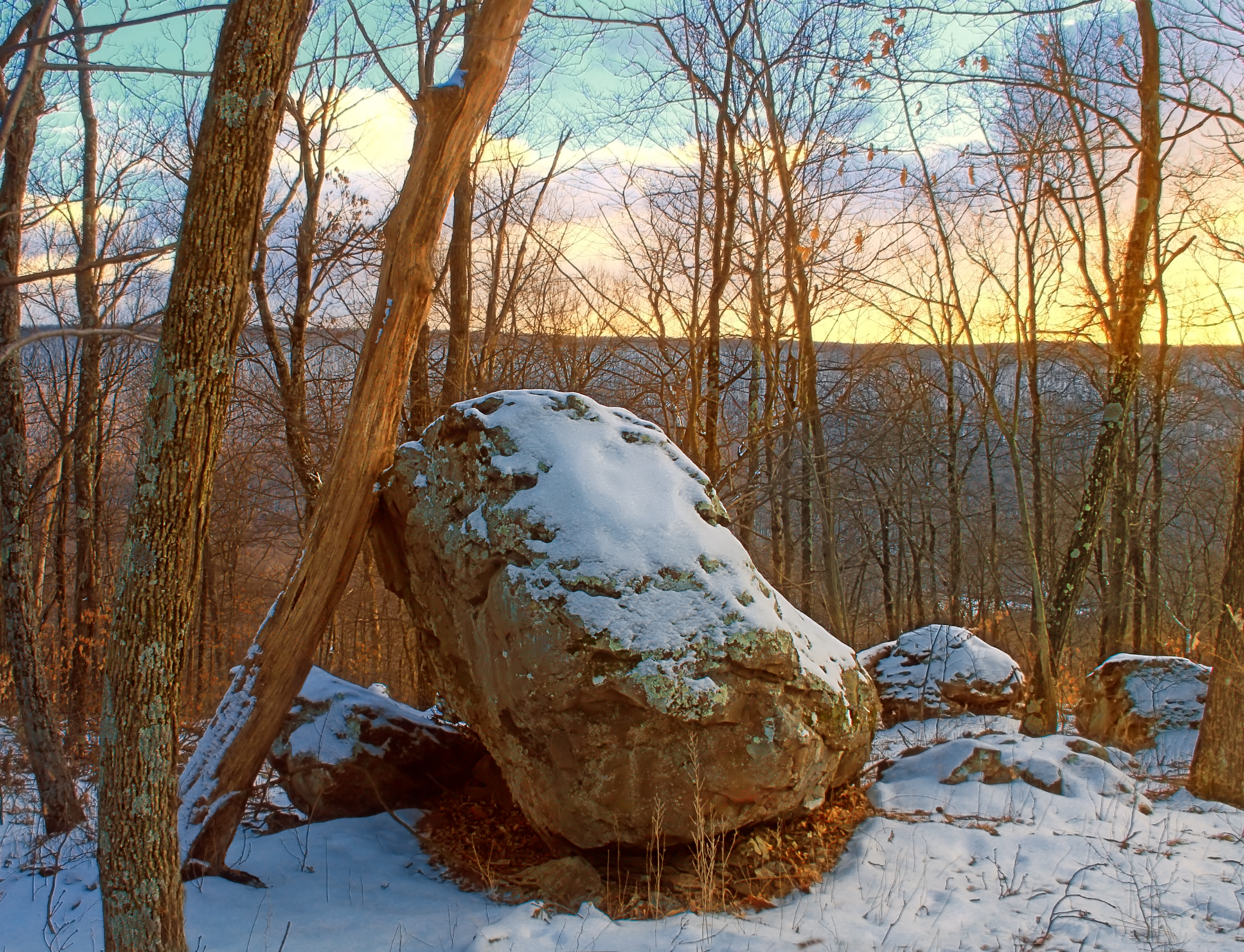
Summit of Mount Yeager, Nescopeck State Park

== Climate ==
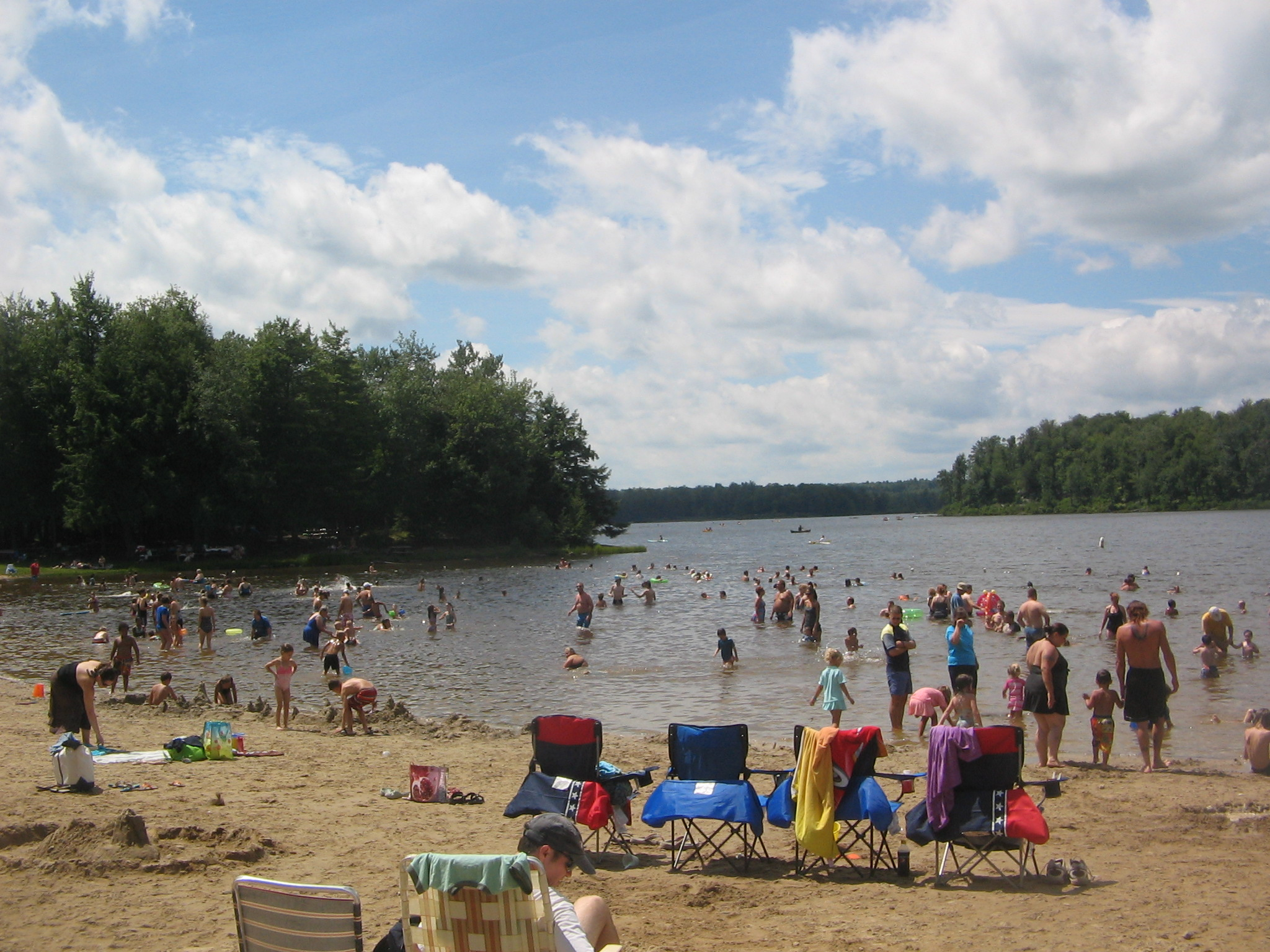
A beach on Lake Jean in July 2010

Luzerne County has a humid continental climate (Köppen climate classification Dfa/mostly Dfb) with four distinct seasons. Winters are cold with a January average of 25.8 °F (−3.4 °C). The surrounding mountains have an influence on the climate (which includes both precipitation and temperature). This results in a wide array of weather conditions throughout the county. On average, temperatures below 0 °F (−17.8 °C) are infrequent, occurring three days per year, and there are 36 days where the maximum temperature remains below 32 °F (0.0 °C). In the Wilkes-Barre area, the average annual snowfall is 46.2 inches (117 cm) during the winter (in which severe snowstorms are rare). However, when snowstorms do occur, they can disrupt normal routines for several days.

Summers are warm with a July average of 71.4 °F (21.9 °C). In an average summer, temperatures exceeding 90 °F (32.2 °C) occur on nine days and can occasionally exceed 100 °F (37.8 °C). Spring and fall are unpredictable, with temperatures ranging from cold to warm (although they are usually mild). On average, Wilkes-Barre receives 38.2 inches (970 mm) of precipitation each year, which is relatively evenly distributed throughout the year (though the summer months receive more precipitation).

Extreme temperatures range from −21 °F (−29.4 °C) on January 21, 1994, to 103 °F (39.4 °C) on July 9, 1936. The hardiness zone is 6b in most lower areas except near the Susquehanna and Lackawanna Rivers where it is 7a, and it is 6a in higher areas. Wilkes-Barre averages 2,303 hours of sunshine per year, ranging from a low of 96 hours in December (or 33% of possible sunshine) to 286 hours in July (or 62% of possible sunshine). Despite being at the south end of the county, Hazleton's temperatures average lower than those of the Wyoming Valley due to its elevation.

Climate data for Wilkes-Barre/Scranton International Airport, Pennsylvania (1991–2020 normals, (Note: Mean monthly maxima and minima (i.e. the expected highest and lowest temperature readings at any point during the year or given month) calculated based on data at said location from 1991 to 2010.) extremes 1901–present (Note: Official records for Avoca/Wilkes-Barre–Scranton kept at downtown Scranton from January 1901 to 17 April 1955 and at Wilkes-Barre/Scranton International Airport since 18 April 1955.))
Month	Jan	Feb	Mar	Apr	May	Jun	Jul	Aug	Sep	Oct	Nov	Dec	Year
Record high °F (°C)	69 (21)	76 (24)	85 (29)	93 (34)	93 (34)	99 (37)	103 (39)	102 (39)	100 (38)	91 (33)	81 (27)	71 (22)	103 (39)
Mean maximum °F (°C)	57.7 (14.3)	57.0 (13.9)	68.0 (20.0)	81.3 (27.4)	88.0 (31.1)	90.5 (32.5)	92.8 (33.8)	90.5 (32.5)	87.6 (30.9)	78.6 (25.9)	69.1 (20.6)	59.6 (15.3)	94.3 (34.6)
Mean daily maximum °F (°C)	35.7 (2.1)	38.8 (3.8)	47.6 (8.7)	61.1 (16.2)	72.2 (22.3)	79.9 (26.6)	84.6 (29.2)	82.4 (28.0)	75.1 (23.9)	63.1 (17.3)	51.2 (10.7)	40.3 (4.6)	61.0 (16.1)
Daily mean °F (°C)	28.0 (−2.2)	30.3 (−0.9)	38.3 (3.5)	50.2 (10.1)	60.9 (16.1)	69.0 (20.6)	73.7 (23.2)	71.8 (22.1)	64.6 (18.1)	53.2 (11.8)	42.7 (5.9)	33.3 (0.7)	51.3 (10.7)
Mean daily minimum °F (°C)	20.3 (−6.5)	21.9 (−5.6)	28.9 (−1.7)	39.3 (4.1)	49.6 (9.8)	58.1 (14.5)	62.7 (17.1)	61.1 (16.2)	54.0 (12.2)	43.3 (6.3)	34.3 (1.3)	26.3 (−3.2)	41.7 (5.4)
Mean minimum °F (°C)	0.6 (−17.4)	3.6 (−15.8)	11.0 (−11.7)	24.7 (−4.1)	34.7 (1.5)	44.1 (6.7)	50.9 (10.5)	48.8 (9.3)	38.7 (3.7)	28.7 (−1.8)	18.0 (−7.8)	9.1 (−12.7)	−1.6 (−18.7)
Record low °F (°C)	−21 (−29)	−19 (−28)	−4 (−20)	8 (−13)	27 (−3)	34 (1)	43 (6)	38 (3)	29 (−2)	19 (−7)	5 (−15)	−13 (−25)	−21 (−29)
Average precipitation inches (mm)	2.59 (66)	2.07 (53)	2.77 (70)	3.26 (83)	3.26 (83)	3.80 (97)	3.61 (92)	3.85 (98)	4.15 (105)	3.71 (94)	2.85 (72)	2.80 (71)	38.72 (983)
Average snowfall inches (cm)	11.7 (30)	10.9 (28)	10.1 (26)	0.8 (2.0)	0.0 (0.0)	0.0 (0.0)	0.0 (0.0)	0.0 (0.0)	0.0 (0.0)	0.7 (1.8)	3.2 (8.1)	7.7 (20)	45.1 (115)
Average precipitation days (≥ 0.01 in)	12.6	11.4	11.8	12.2	12.9	12.9	11.1	11.1	10.0	10.7	10.3	12.1	139.1
Average snowy days (≥ 0.1 in)	8.7	8.4	4.8	1.0	0.0	0.0	0.0	0.0	0.0	0.3	1.7	6.3	31.2
Average relative humidity (%)	70.1	67.5	63.3	60.4	64.6	70.5	71.1	73.8	75.2	71.6	71.8	72.5	69.4
Average dew point °F (°C)	16.2 (−8.8)	17.2 (−8.2)	24.4 (−4.2)	33.1 (0.6)	45.3 (7.4)	55.9 (13.3)	60.4 (15.8)	59.9 (15.5)	53.4 (11.9)	41.4 (5.2)	32.2 (0.1)	22.3 (−5.4)	38.5 (3.6)
Mean monthly sunshine hours	130.3	143.7	185.7	210.5	246.9	269.7	285.7	257.2	200.2	173.3	104.3	95.9	2,303.4
Percentage possible sunshine	44	48	50	53	55	60	62	60	54	50	35	33	52
Source: NOAA (relative humidity and dew point 1964–1990, sun 1961–1990)

Climate data for Hazleton, Luzerne County, PA
Month	Jan	Feb	Mar	Apr	May	Jun	Jul	Aug	Sep	Oct	Nov	Dec	Year
Mean daily maximum °F (°C)	31.9 (−0.1)	35.4 (1.9)	44.1 (6.7)	57.4 (14.1)	68.1 (20.1)	75.8 (24.3)	79.7 (26.5)	77.5 (25.3)	70.8 (21.6)	59.7 (15.4)	47.8 (8.8)	36.3 (2.4)	57.1 (13.9)
Daily mean °F (°C)	23.8 (−4.6)	26.9 (−2.8)	34.4 (1.3)	46.7 (8.2)	57.3 (14.1)	65.6 (18.7)	70.0 (21.1)	68.1 (20.1)	61.1 (16.2)	49.8 (9.9)	39.5 (4.2)	28.5 (−1.9)	47.7 (8.7)
Mean daily minimum °F (°C)	15.7 (−9.1)	18.3 (−7.6)	24.7 (−4.1)	36.0 (2.2)	46.6 (8.1)	55.4 (13.0)	60.4 (15.8)	58.6 (14.8)	51.4 (10.8)	39.9 (4.4)	31.3 (−0.4)	20.7 (−6.3)	38.3 (3.5)
Average precipitation inches (mm)	3.20 (81)	2.90 (74)	3.55 (90)	4.43 (113)	4.47 (114)	5.19 (132)	4.43 (113)	4.34 (110)	4.78 (121)	4.49 (114)	4.24 (108)	3.71 (94)	49.73 (1,263)
Average relative humidity (%)	74.6	69.0	64.9	61.1	64.7	73.2	73.7	77.0	77.7	74.2	73.4	75.7	71.6
Source: PRISM Climate Group

== Ecology ==
Sceptridium dissectum is a common fern in the county.

== Demographics ==
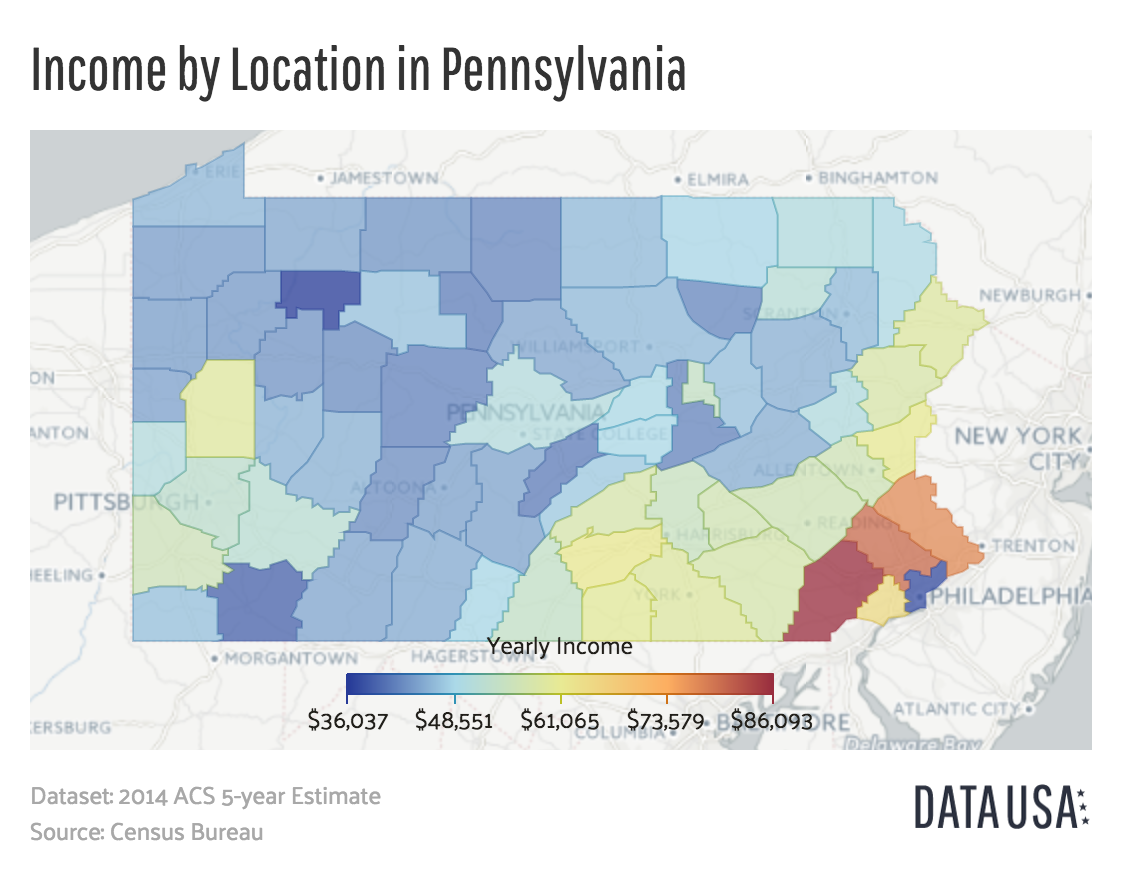
Average household income by county in Pennsylvania. Data shown is from the 2014 American Community Survey (a 5-year estimate). Luzerne County can be seen in the northeast.

Historical population
Census	Pop.	Note	%±
1790	4,892		—
1800	12,839		162.4%
1810	18,109		41.0%
1820	20,027		10.6%
1830	27,379		36.7%
1840	44,006		60.7%
1850	56,072		27.4%
1860	90,244		60.9%
1870	160,915		78.3%
1880	133,065		−17.3%
1890	201,203		51.2%
1900	257,121		27.8%
1910	343,186		33.5%
1920	390,991		13.9%
1930	445,109		13.8%
1940	441,518		−0.8%
1950	392,241		−11.2%
1960	346,972		−11.5%
1970	342,301		−1.3%
1980	343,079		0.2%
1990	328,149		−4.4%
2000	319,255		−2.7%
2010	320,918		0.5%
2020	325,594		1.5%
2025 (est.)	332,126	▲	2.0%

=== 2020 census ===
As of the 2020 census, the county had a population of 325,594. The median age was 43.4 years. 19.4% of residents were under the age of 18 and 20.5% of residents were 65 years of age or older. For every 100 females there were 97.0 males, and for every 100 females age 18 and over there were 95.2 males age 18 and over.

The racial makeup of the county was 78.9% White, 5.0% Black or African American, 0.3% American Indian and Alaska Native, 1.3% Asian, <0.1% Native Hawaiian and Pacific Islander, 7.7% from some other race, and 6.8% from two or more races. Hispanic or Latino residents of any race comprised 14.4% of the population.

77.8% of residents lived in urban areas, while 22.2% lived in rural areas.

There were 134,551 households in the county, of which 25.6% had children under the age of 18 living in them. Of all households, 41.3% were married-couple households, 20.9% were households with a male householder and no spouse or partner present, and 29.9% were households with a female householder and no spouse or partner present. About 32.0% of all households were made up of individuals and 14.7% had someone living alone who was 65 years of age or older.

There were 150,693 housing units, of which 10.7% were vacant. Among occupied housing units, 65.4% were owner-occupied and 34.6% were renter-occupied. The homeowner vacancy rate was 1.6% and the rental vacancy rate was 7.4%.

=== 2010 census ===
According to the 2010 census, the county was 90.7% White, 3.4% Black or African American, 0.2% Native American, 1.0% Asian, 3.3% other race, and 1.5% were of two or more races. 6.7% of the population were of Hispanic or Latino ancestry.

=== 2000 census ===
According to the census of 2000, there were 319,250 people, 130,687 households, and 84,293 families residing in the county. The population density was 358 inhabitants per square mile (138 inhabitants/km^{2}). There were 144,686 housing units at an average density of 162 units per square mile (63 units/km^{2}). The racial makeup of the county was 96.63% White, 1.69% Black or African American, 0.09% Native American, 0.58% Asian, 0.01% Pacific Islander, 0.43% other race, and 0.57% from two or more races. 1.16% of the population were Hispanic or Latino. 22.2% were of Polish ancestry, 15.6% of Italian ancestry, 13.8% of Irish ancestry, 12.1% of German ancestry, and 5.3% of Slovak ancestry. Luzerne County is the only county in the United States with a plurality of citizens reporting Polish as their primary ancestry; the plurality of Pennsylvanians report German or Pennsylvania Dutch.

There were 130,687 households, out of which 48.80% were married couples living together. 11.50% had a female householder with no husband present. 35.50% were non-families. 31.30% of all households were made up of individuals. 16% of those age 65 years and older lived alone. The average household size was 2.34 and the average family size was 2.95.

In the county, the population consisted of 21% under the age of 18, 8.10% from 18 to 24, 27.20% from 25 to 44, 24% from 45 to 64, and 19.70% who were 65 years of age or older. The median age was 41 years. For every 100 females, there were 93 males. For every 100 females (age 18 and over), there were 89.50 males.

=== Other demographic statistics ===
The median household income (in 2015 dollars) was $45,897. 15.1% of the population lives in poverty. 60.4% of those 16 years of age or older are in the civilian labor force. There are more white collar jobs in Luzerne County than blue collar jobs. In total, there are 91,801 white collar jobs and 62,813 blue collar jobs. The mean travel time to work (for those 16 years of age or older) was 22.1 minutes. In terms of education, 88.9% (of those 25 years of age or older) are high school graduates or higher. 21.4% (of those 25 years of age or older) have a bachelor's degree or higher. In terms of healthcare, 10.8% (for those under the age of 65) are living with a disability. As of 2015, 25,317 veterans are living in Luzerne County.

=== Languages ===
The two major languages spoken in Luzerne County are English and Spanish. 5.8% of the population speaks Spanish at home.

=== Religion ===
59.27% of the people in Luzerne County are religious, meaning they affiliate with a religion. 43.77% are Catholic; 0.28% are LDS (or the Church of Jesus Christ of Latter-day Saints); 0.51% are Baptist; 0.55% are Episcopalian; 1.05% are Pentecostal; 3.11% are Lutheran; 4.40% are Methodist; 1.95% are Presbyterian; 2.33% are of some other Christian faith; 0.78% are Jewish; 0.00% are of an eastern faith; and 0.51% practice Islam.

=== Racial and ethnic composition ===
Luzerne County, Pennsylvania – Racial and ethnic composition Note: the US Census treats Hispanic/Latino as an ethnic category. This table excludes Latinos from the racial categories and assigns them to a separate category. Hispanics/Latinos may be of any race.
Race / Ethnicity (NH = Non-Hispanic)	Pop 1980	Pop 1990	Pop 2000	Pop 2010	Pop 2020	% 1980	% 1990	% 2000	% 2010	% 2020
White alone (NH)	338,296	320,571	306,528	283,058	250,304	98.61%	97.69%	96.02%	88.20%	76.88%
Black or African American alone (NH)	2,280	3,795	5,202	9,539	14,031	0.66%	1.16%	1.63%	2.97%	4.31%
Native American or Alaska Native alone (NH)	147	210	248	280	295	0.04%	0.06%	0.08%	0.09%	0.09%
Asian alone (NH)	841	1,465	1,856	3,079	3,960	0.25%	0.45%	0.58%	0.96%	1.22%
Native Hawaiian or Pacific Islander alone (NH)	x	x	42	41	65	x	x	0.01%	0.01%	0.02%
Other race alone (NH)	209	85	140	234	985	0.06%	0.03%	0.04%	0.07%	0.30%
Mixed race or Multiracial (NH)	x	x	1,521	3,196	9,056	x	x	0.48%	1.00%	2.78%
Hispanic or Latino (any race)	1,306	2,023	3,713	21,491	46,898	0.38%	0.62%	1.16%	6.70%	14.40%
Total	343,079	328,149	319,250	320,918	325,594	100.00%	100.00%	100.00%	100.00%	100.00%

== Economy ==
Luzerne County is Northeastern Pennsylvania's largest economy with a GDP of $20.58 billion. The county's contemporary economy is anchored heavily by the logistics, warehousing, and supply chain management sectors, driven by its strategic location at the intersection of Interstates 80 and 81. Major regional industrial hubs, such as the CenterPoint Commerce & Trade Park and the Humboldt Industrial Park, house fulfillment operations for prominent multinational corporations like Amazon and Chewy. Beyond transportation and distribution infrastructure, the county's primary economic drivers include a robust healthcare sector—anchored by providers like Geisinger Health System—alongside food and equipment manufacturing, higher education institutions, and high-value utility energy generation at the Susquehanna Steam Electric Station.

Luzerne County ranks 11th out of Pennsylvania's 67 counties in terms of economic impact from tourism. According to annual data released by the Pennsylvania Tourism Office and Tourism Economics, Luzerne County sits firmly in the top tier of the state's tourism economies and is part of a select group of Pennsylvania counties generating over $1 billion in annual visitor spending.

Grains, seeds, beans, and peas make up about one third of the county's farm revenues. Due to its position as a somewhat less populated area near much larger metropolises, Luzerne's agritourism business is one of the larger in the state.

Luzerne is both a productive farming county and a commuter location for nearby large cities. As such farmland is often converted to other real estate uses, and the county has created the Luzerne Conservation District to encourage conservation. The Luzerne CD runs the Farmland Preservation Program to encourage farmland to be set aside instead of turning it into construction and development.

== Government ==
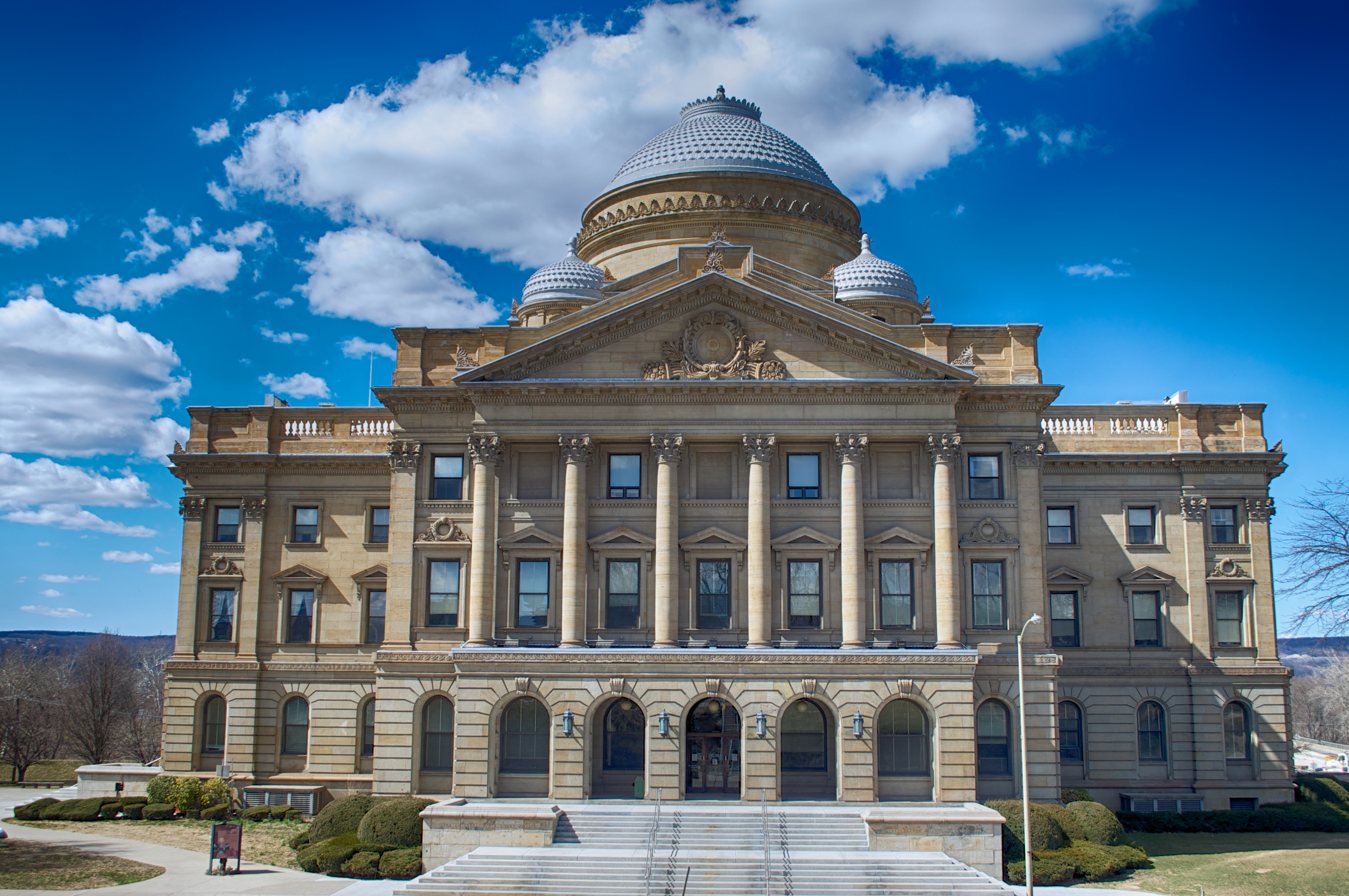
Luzerne County Courthouse in Wilkes-Barre

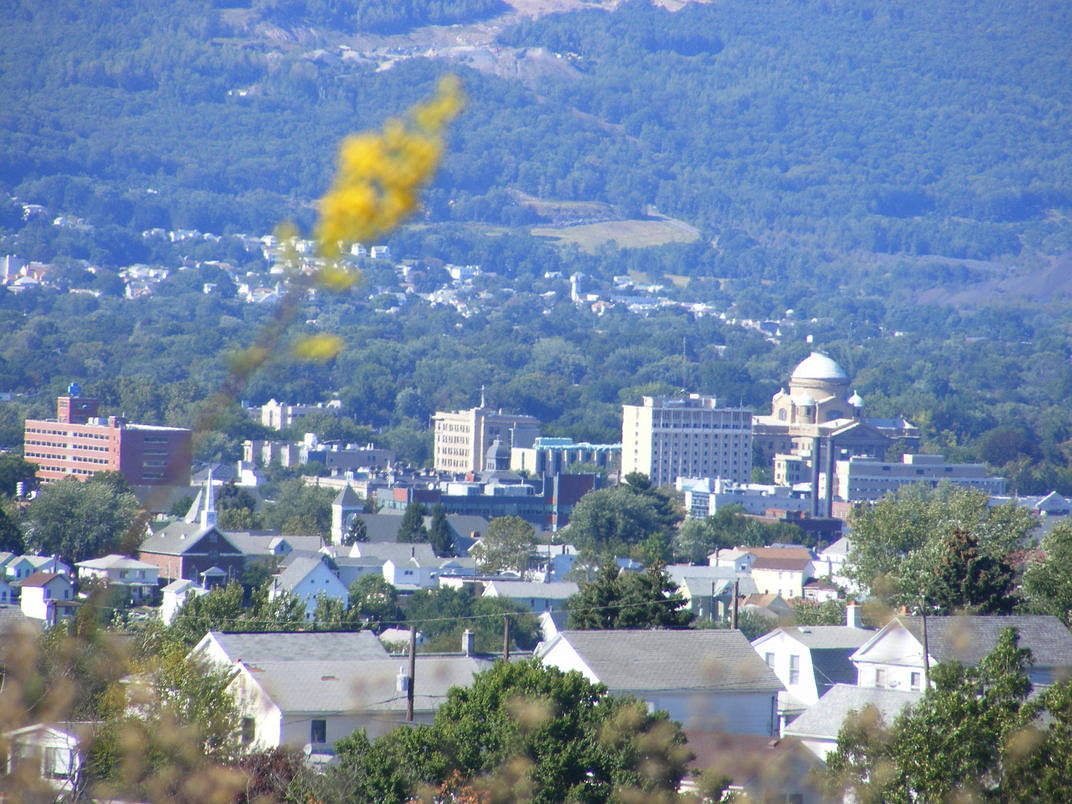
The courthouse dome amid the Wilkes-Barre skyline

=== Background ===
Luzerne County voters rejected home rule proposals in the past (once in 1974 and again in 2003). However, from 2008 to 2010, corruption plagued the county government. Three county judges, a county commissioner, a clerk of courts, a deputy chief clerk, and a director of human resources faced criminal charges. These events persuaded the voters of Luzerne County to adopt a new form of government. On Tuesday, November 2, 2010, a home rule charter was adopted by a margin of 51,413 to 41,639.

The following year (in 2011), the first election for the new government was held. On Monday, January 2, 2012, the previous government (the board of county commissioners) was abolished and replaced with the new form of government (council–manager government). The first members of the Luzerne County Council were sworn in that same day. The council's highest-ranking officer is the chair, who is also the head of county government for ceremonial purposes. The first council chair was Jim Bobeck. The assembly consists of eleven elected members. They appoint and work alongside a full-time manager. The manager oversees the county's day-to-day operations. The first manager was Robert Lawton.

=== County Council ===
Luzerne County Council is the governing body of the county. The council meets at the Luzerne County Courthouse. There are eleven members on the assembly – eight Democrats and three Republicans. Each member is duly elected by the voters of the county. The chair is appointed by their fellow council members. The chair is both the highest-ranking officer on the council and the head of county government for ceremonial purposes. He or she sets the agenda for the council and administers the meetings. When the group is not in session, the officer's duties often include acting as its representative to the outside world and its spokesperson. The current chair is Jimmy Sabatino.

Current council members
Council member	Tenure	Party	Position
Jimmy Sabatino	2024–present	Democratic	Chair
Brittany Stephenson	2024–present	Democratic	Vice Chair
Patty Krushnowski	2024–present	Democratic	
Joanna Bryn Smith	2024–present	Democratic	
Denise Williams	2026–present	Democratic	
Dawn Simmons	2026–present	Democratic	
Steven Coslett	2026–present	Democratic	
Chris Belles	2026–present	Democratic	
John Lombardo	2022–present	Republican	
Lee Ann McDermott	2020–present	Republican	
Harry Haas	2012–2022, 2024–present	Republican	

List of council chairs

	Chair	Tenure	Party	Notes
1	Jim Bobeck	2012	Democratic	
2	Tim McGinley	2012–2014	Democratic	
3	Rick Morelli	2014–2015	Republican	
4	Linda McClosky Houck	2015–2018	Democratic	First female chair
5	Tim McGinley	2018–2022	Democratic	
6	Kendra Vough	2022–2024	Republican	
7	John Lombardo	2024–2026	Republican	
8	Jimmy Sabatino	2026–present	Democratic	

=== County Manager ===
The executive branch is headed by the Luzerne County Manager. The manager supervises the county's day-to-day operations. According to the home rule charter, the manager "shall serve at the pleasure of county council." In other words, the council has the power to appoint and remove the manager. Each ordinance, resolution, and policy established by county council should be faithfully executed by the county manager. The manager may make recommendations to the council; however, the manager does not have the authority to vote on or veto any legislation originating from the assembly. The current county manager is Romilda P. Crocamo.

=== Other county officials ===
- Controller: Tim McGinley
- President Judge: Stefanie J. Salavantis
- District Attorney: Samuel Sanguedolce
- Chief Public Defender: Joseph Yeager, Esq.
- Sheriff: Genesis C. Arias
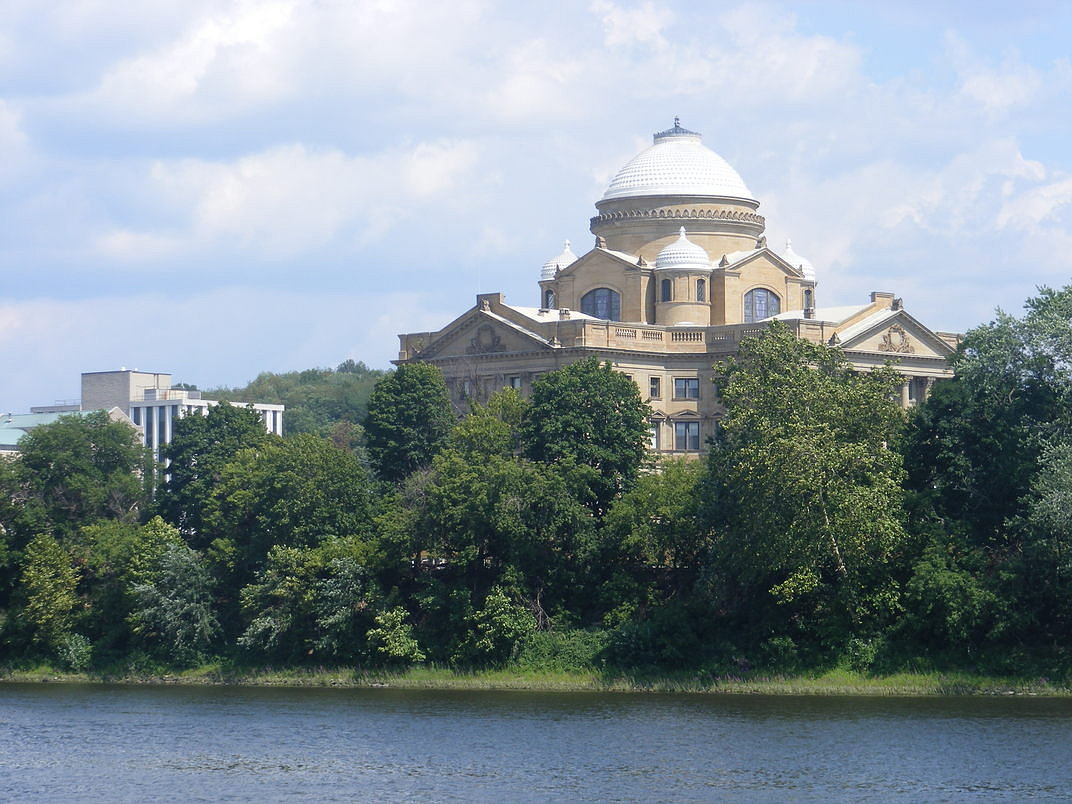
Luzerne County Courthouse

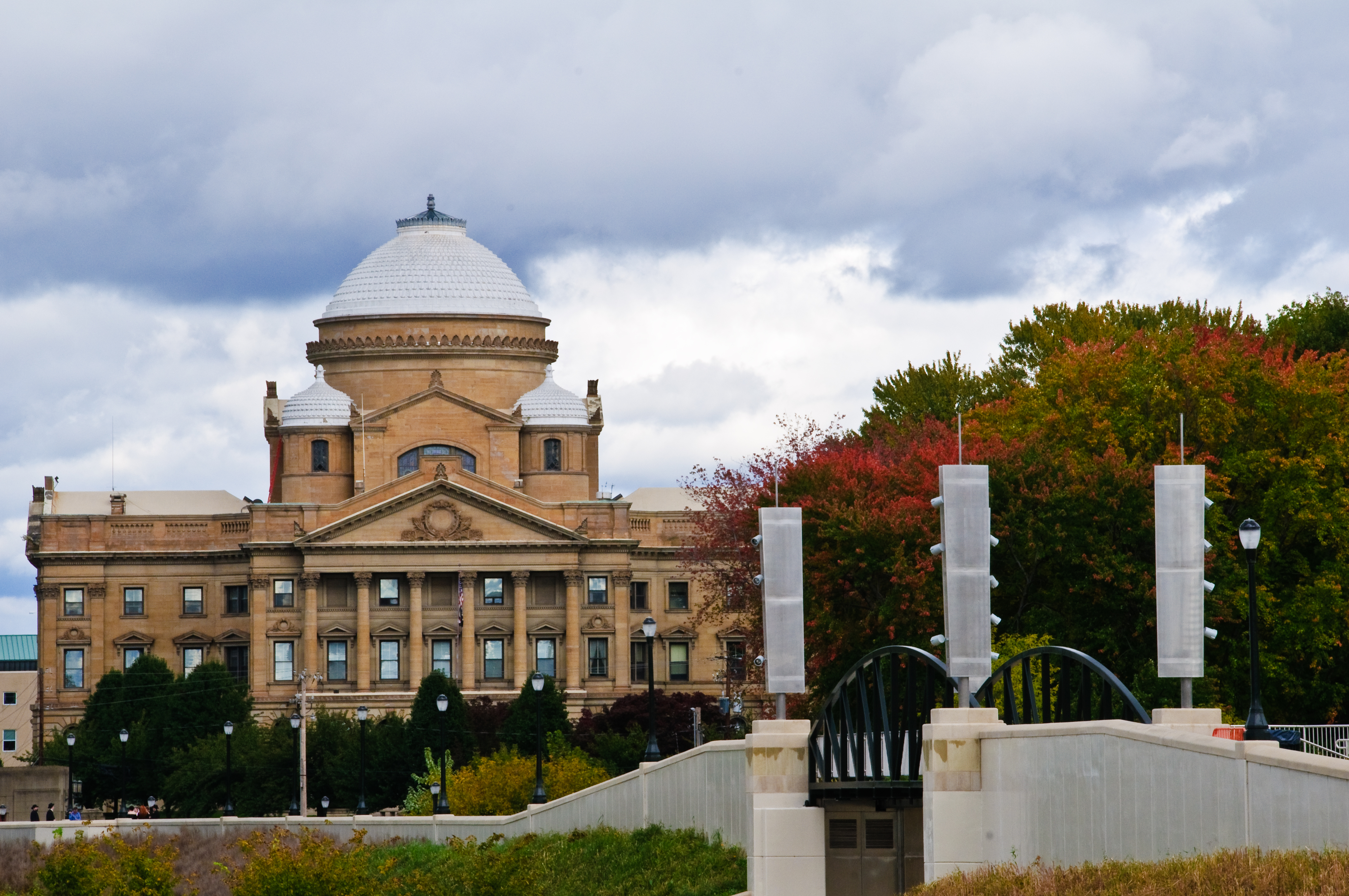
Luzerne County Courthouse, October 2009

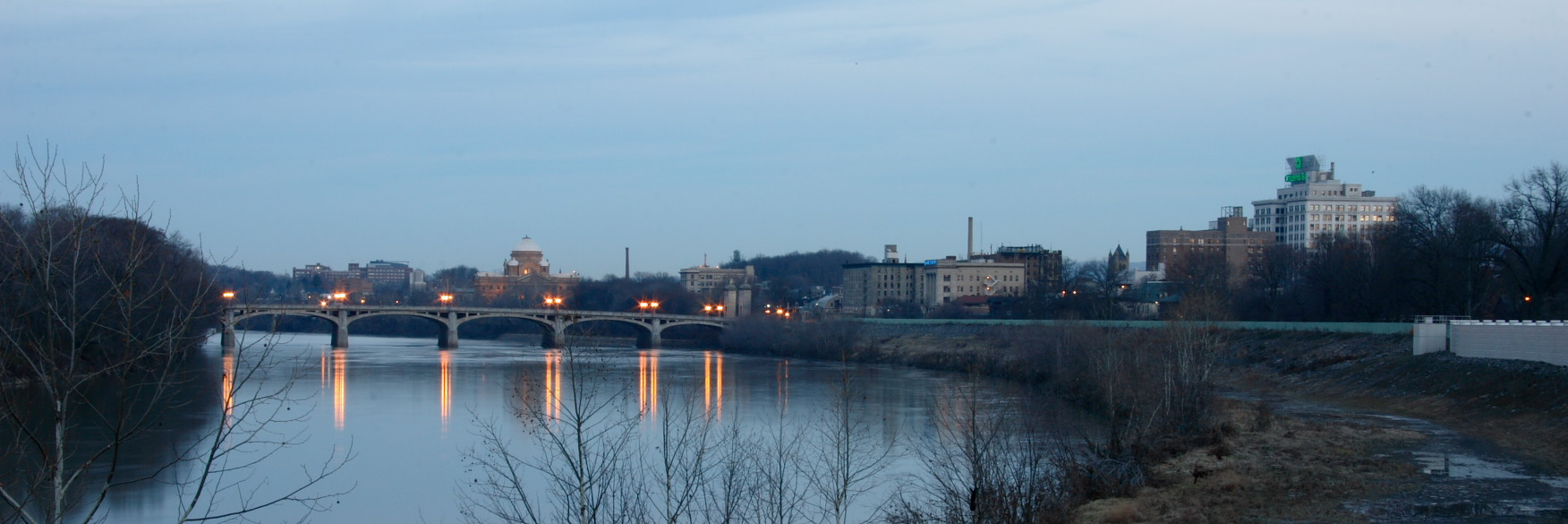
The Susquehanna River and the Wilkes-Barre skyline with the Luzerne County Courthouse in the background

== Politics ==
Historical election results: U.S. President, U.S. Senators, Pennsylvania Governor

United States presidential election results for Luzerne County, Pennsylvania
Year	Republican		Democratic		Third party(ies)	
Year	No.	%	No.	%	No.	%
1880	11,028	45.94%	12,575	52.38%	403	1.68%
1884	12,859	47.18%	13,806	50.65%	592	2.17%
1888	15,543	49.25%	15,218	48.22%	797	2.53%
1892	14,118	45.21%	15,734	50.38%	1,377	4.41%
1896	22,718	55.08%	17,305	41.95%	1,225	2.97%
1900	21,793	54.87%	16,470	41.47%	1,454	3.66%
1904	27,809	64.83%	13,518	31.51%	1,568	3.66%
1908	24,594	56.24%	17,379	39.74%	1,760	4.02%
1912	4,970	12.02%	13,461	32.56%	22,907	55.41%
1916	25,348	53.73%	19,999	42.39%	1,832	3.88%
1920	49,419	65.39%	23,473	31.06%	2,683	3.55%
1924	46,475	53.18%	20,472	23.42%	20,449	23.40%
1928	67,872	48.00%	73,319	51.85%	220	0.16%
1932	52,672	45.44%	60,975	52.60%	2,281	1.97%
1936	81,572	43.26%	105,008	55.68%	1,997	1.06%
1940	79,685	43.81%	101,577	55.85%	622	0.34%
1944	67,984	47.81%	73,674	51.81%	541	0.38%
1948	71,674	52.85%	61,869	45.62%	2,068	1.52%
1952	88,967	54.83%	72,579	44.73%	715	0.44%
1956	92,458	58.22%	65,155	41.02%	1,207	0.76%
1960	70,711	40.58%	102,998	59.10%	562	0.32%
1964	43,895	28.86%	106,397	69.97%	1,779	1.17%
1968	57,044	39.79%	79,040	55.13%	7,296	5.09%
1972	81,358	60.89%	51,128	38.27%	1,120	0.84%
1976	60,058	44.16%	74,655	54.89%	1,296	0.95%
1980	67,822	50.21%	59,976	44.40%	7,282	5.39%
1984	69,169	53.50%	58,482	45.23%	1,640	1.27%
1988	59,059	50.01%	58,553	49.58%	480	0.41%
1992	49,285	38.76%	56,623	44.53%	21,238	16.70%
1996	43,577	37.30%	60,174	51.51%	13,066	11.19%
2000	52,328	43.76%	62,199	52.01%	5,059	4.23%
2004	64,953	47.75%	69,573	51.15%	1,502	1.10%
2008	61,127	44.96%	72,492	53.32%	2,349	1.73%
2012	58,325	46.72%	64,307	51.51%	2,213	1.77%
2016	78,688	57.90%	52,451	38.60%	4,762	3.50%
2020	86,929	56.63%	64,873	42.26%	1,697	1.11%
2024	92,444	59.10%	62,504	39.96%	1,484	0.95%

United States Senate election results for Luzerne County, Pennsylvania1
Year	Republican		Democratic		Third party(ies)	
Year	No.	%	No.	%	No.	%
1994	40,362	45.18%	47,376	53.03%	1,605	1.80%
2000	55,549	50.67%	51,613	47.08%	2,461	2.24%
2006	37,648	39.42%	57,868	60.58%	0	0.00%
2012	53,168	43.28%	66,951	54.50%	2,738	2.23%
2018	58,040	53.59%	49,200	45.43%	1,056	0.98%
2024	87,048	56.17%	64,495	41.61%	3,442	2.22%

United States Senate election results for Luzerne County, Pennsylvania3
Year	Republican		Democratic		Third party(ies)	
Year	No.	%	No.	%	No.	%
1992	59,642	49.27%	58,125	48.02%	3,281	2.71%
1998	44,513	62.64%	24,205	34.06%	2,348	3.30%
2004	71,031	56.11%	50,528	39.92%	5,029	3.97%
2010	45,313	49.32%	46,566	50.68%	0	0.00%
2016	66,551	50.54%	56,477	42.89%	8,650	6.57%
2022	61,978	53.28%	51,504	44.28%	2,841	2.44%

Pennsylvania Gubernatorial election results for Luzerne County
Year	Republican		Democratic		Third party(ies)	
Year	No.	%	No.	%	No.	%
1970	47,225	39.65%	69,199	58.10%	2,670	2.24%
1974	47,015	43.75%	59,733	55.58%	727	0.68%
1978	56,054	51.38%	52,513	48.14%	522	0.48%
1982	47,021	42.40%	63,327	57.10%	549	0.50%
1986	37,572	35.79%	66,790	63.63%	610	0.58%
1990	14,448	19.40%	60,043	80.60%	0	0.00%
1994	38,233	41.29%	43,786	47.28%	10,587	11.43%
1998	44,030	58.96%	23,827	31.90%	6,827	9.14%
2002	38,760	44.68%	45,641	52.61%	2,345	2.70%
2006	31,051	32.45%	64,628	67.55%	0	0.00%
2010	49,734	53.41%	43,392	46.59%	0	0.00%
2014	32,605	43.93%	41,609	56.07%	0	0.00%
2018	50,701	47.02%	55,734	51.69%	1,388	1.29%
2022	56,326	48.53%	57,598	49.63%	2,140	1.84%

The Democratic Party has been historically dominant in county-level politics. However, during the 2019 Luzerne County Council election, Republicans – for the first time – secured a majority on the council, the county's governing body. Thomas Baldino, professor emeritus of political science at Wilkes University, suspected that the 2019 Luzerne County Council election results were due to the trending Republican preference in the county (mostly due to then-President Trump's popularity in the region). In 2024, Republicans took the lead in county voter registration.

During presidential elections, the county was considered a bellwether of the state. Until 2020, it had voted for the presidential candidate who carried Pennsylvania in every election since 1936. Luzerne County has leaned Democratic in past presidential elections; however, that trend has changed in recent years. During the 2000 U.S. presidential election, Democrat Al Gore won 52% of the vote to Republican George W. Bush's 44%. In 2004, it was much closer, with Democrat John Kerry winning 51% to Republican George Bush's 48%. Democrat Barack Obama carried the county twice (once in 2008, and again in 2012). During the 2016 presidential election, the county swung dramatically to Republican Donald Trump, who won it with 58% of the vote, the largest margin since President Richard Nixon in 1972. It was the first time a Republican presidential candidate carried the county since 1988. Trump also won the county easily in 2020 and 2024.

Luzerne County has generally voted Republican in U.S. Senate elections. In 2000, 2004, 2016, 2018, 2022, and 2024, the Republican candidates for the Senate won the county. However, Democratic Senate candidates carried the county in 2006 (with 60.6% of the vote), 2010, and 2012.

Democratic candidates for Pennsylvania governor won Luzerne County in 2002, 2006 (with 67.5% of the vote), 2014, 2018, and 2022. In recent years, the county voted for a Republican gubernatorial candidate only once (in 2010).

Near the end of the 2020 presidential election, nine mail-in ballots for the county were discovered in a trash can, several of which were cast for Trump. An investigation was started, and after several months it determined that the incident was accidental. Trump used this controversy to attack the legitimacy of the election. Later, in the 2022 midterm elections, another controversy occurred when an error caused several voting machines in the county to run out of paper.

=== Voter registration ===
As of March 23, 2026, there were 205,956 registered voters in Luzerne County.

- Republican: 91,172 (44.27%)
- Democratic: 84,037 (40.80%)
- Independent/Third Party: 30,747 (14.93%)

=== United States Senate ===
- Dave McCormick, R
- John Fetterman, D

=== United States House of Representatives ===
- Rob Bresnahan, R, Pennsylvania's 8th congressional district
- Dan Meuser, R, Pennsylvania's 9th congressional district

=== State Senate ===
- Lisa Baker, R, Pennsylvania's 20th Senatorial District
- Marty Flynn, D, Pennsylvania's 22nd Senatorial District
- Lynda Schlegel Culver, R, Pennsylvania's 27th Senatorial District
- Dave Argall, R, Pennsylvania's 29th Senatorial District

=== State House of Representatives ===
- Dane Watro, R, Pennsylvania's 116th Representative District
- Jamie Walsh, R, Pennsylvania's 117th Representative District
- Jim Haddock, D, Pennsylvania's 118th Representative District
- Alec Ryncavage, R, Pennsylvania's 119th Representative District
- Brenda Pugh, R, Pennsylvania's 120th Representative District
- Eddie Day Pashinski, D, Pennsylvania's 121st Representative District

== Public safety ==
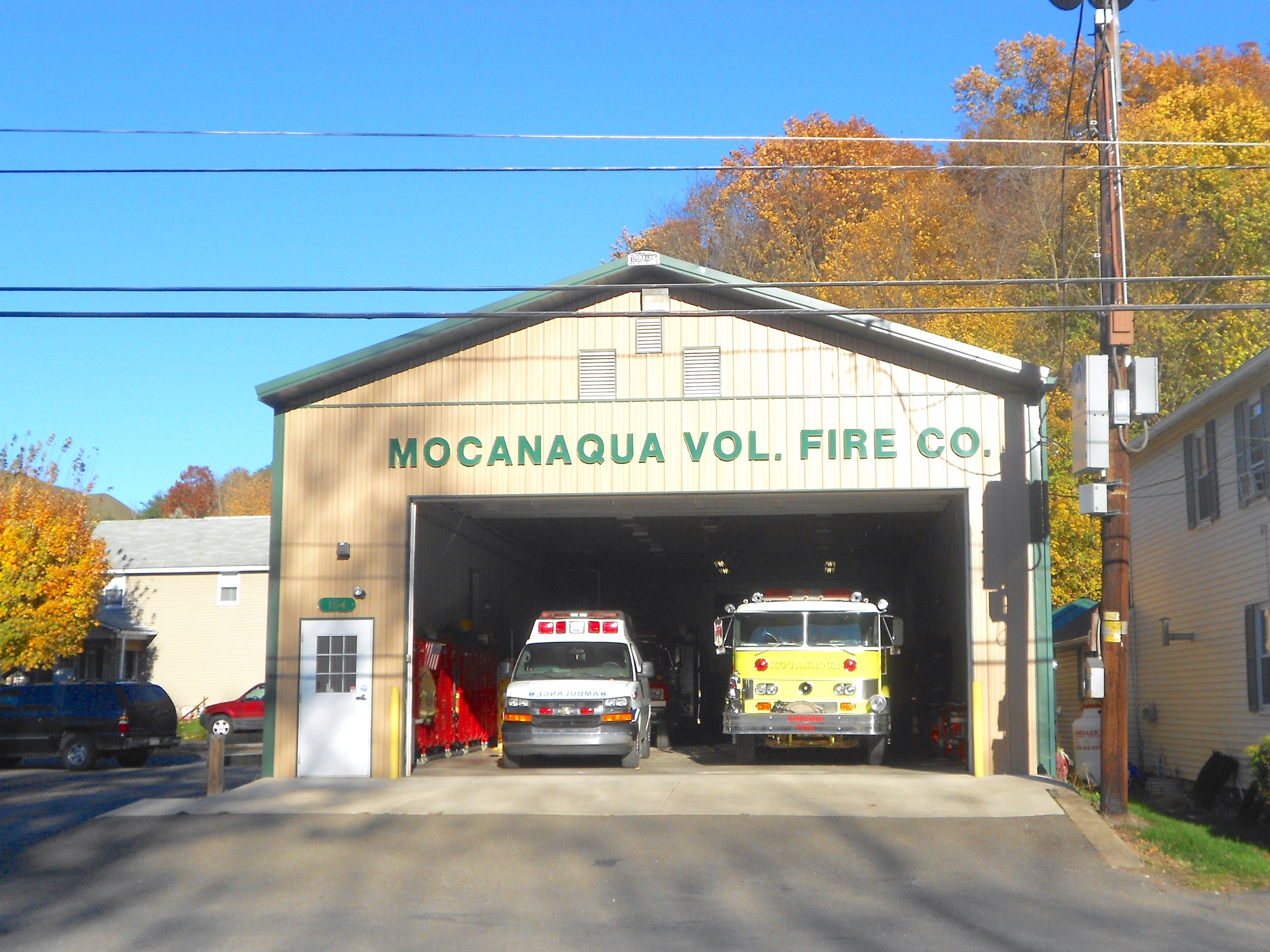
A volunteer fire department in Mocanaqua in November 2016

There are many fire and police departments scattered throughout Luzerne County. Each individual community (city, borough, and township) determines the boundaries of each department. The firefighters provide fire protection for its citizens. Most fire departments are headed by a fire chief and are staffed by a combination of career and volunteer firefighters.

The police provide full-time protection to its citizens, visitors, businesses, and public property. Most departments are headed by a chief of police and operate out of their local municipal building. The Luzerne County Sheriff's Office operates out of Wilkes-Barre's Luzerne County Courthouse. The sheriff is an official who is responsible for keeping the peace and enforcing the law throughout the county.

After Luzerne County adopted a home rule charter, the office of sheriff became an appointed position (and was no longer an elected one). The Pennsylvania State Police also have a presence in the county. Troop P operates out of the northern half of Luzerne County and is headquartered in Hanover Township as PSP Wilkes-Barre. Troop P also has a barracks in Salem Township—PSP Shickshinny. Troop N operates out of the southern portion of the county and is headquartered in West Hazleton as PSP Hazleton.

== Healthcare ==
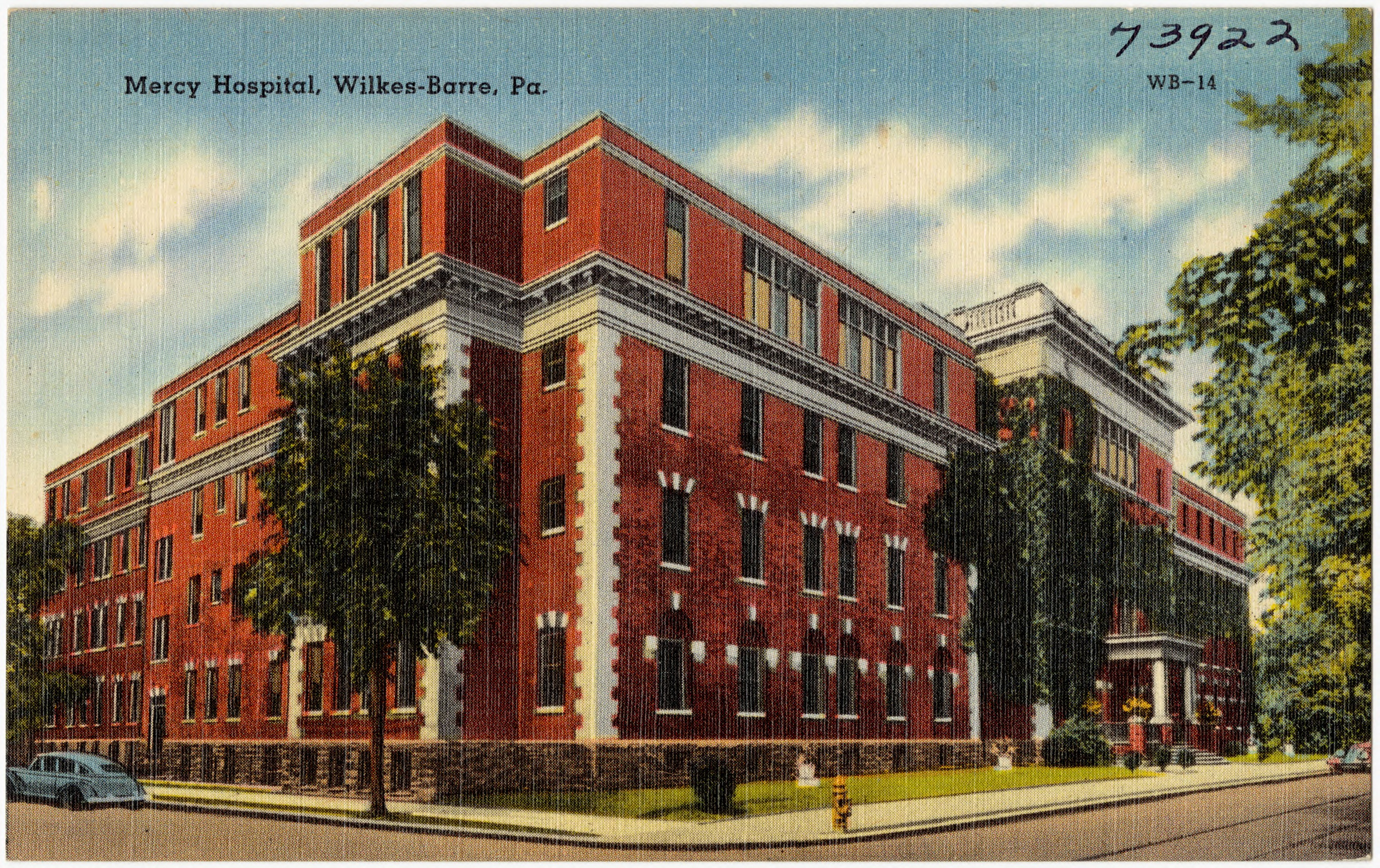
Mercy Hospital in Wilkes-Barre as depicted in drawing made between 1930 and 1945

=== Hospitals ===
- First Hospital in Kingston, an affiliate of Commonwealth Health (psychiatric care only)
- Geisinger South Wilkes Barre Hospital (GSWB), formerly Mercy Hospital
- Geisinger Wyoming Valley Medical Center (GWV) in Plains Township
- Hazleton General Hospital (Lehigh Valley Health Network)
- Nanticoke Special Care Hospital, an affiliate of Commonwealth Health
- VA Medical Center in Wilkes-Barre
- Wilkes-Barre General Hospital, an affiliate of Commonwealth Health

== Education ==
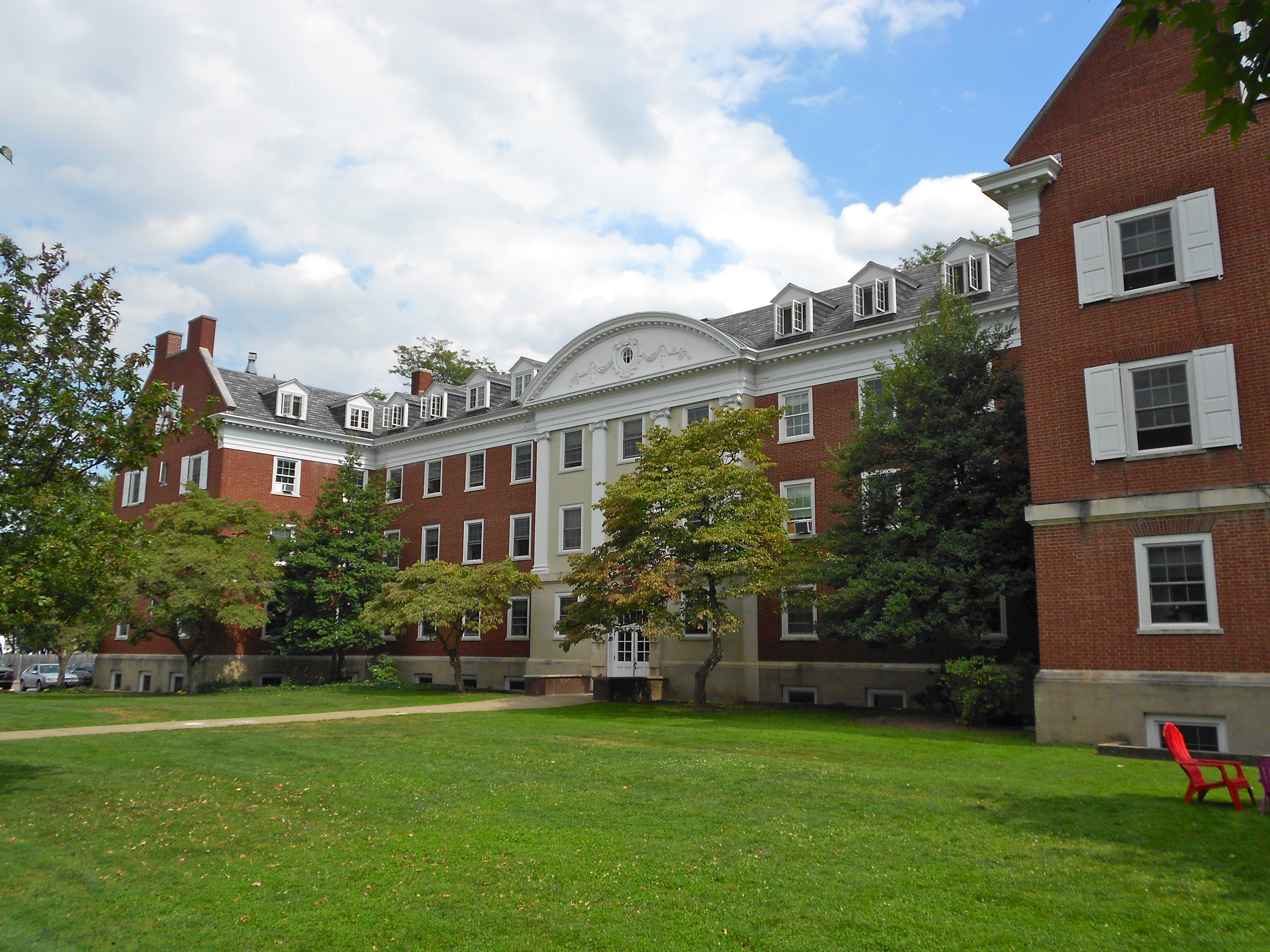
Carpenter Hall at Wyoming Seminary in Kingston, August 2013

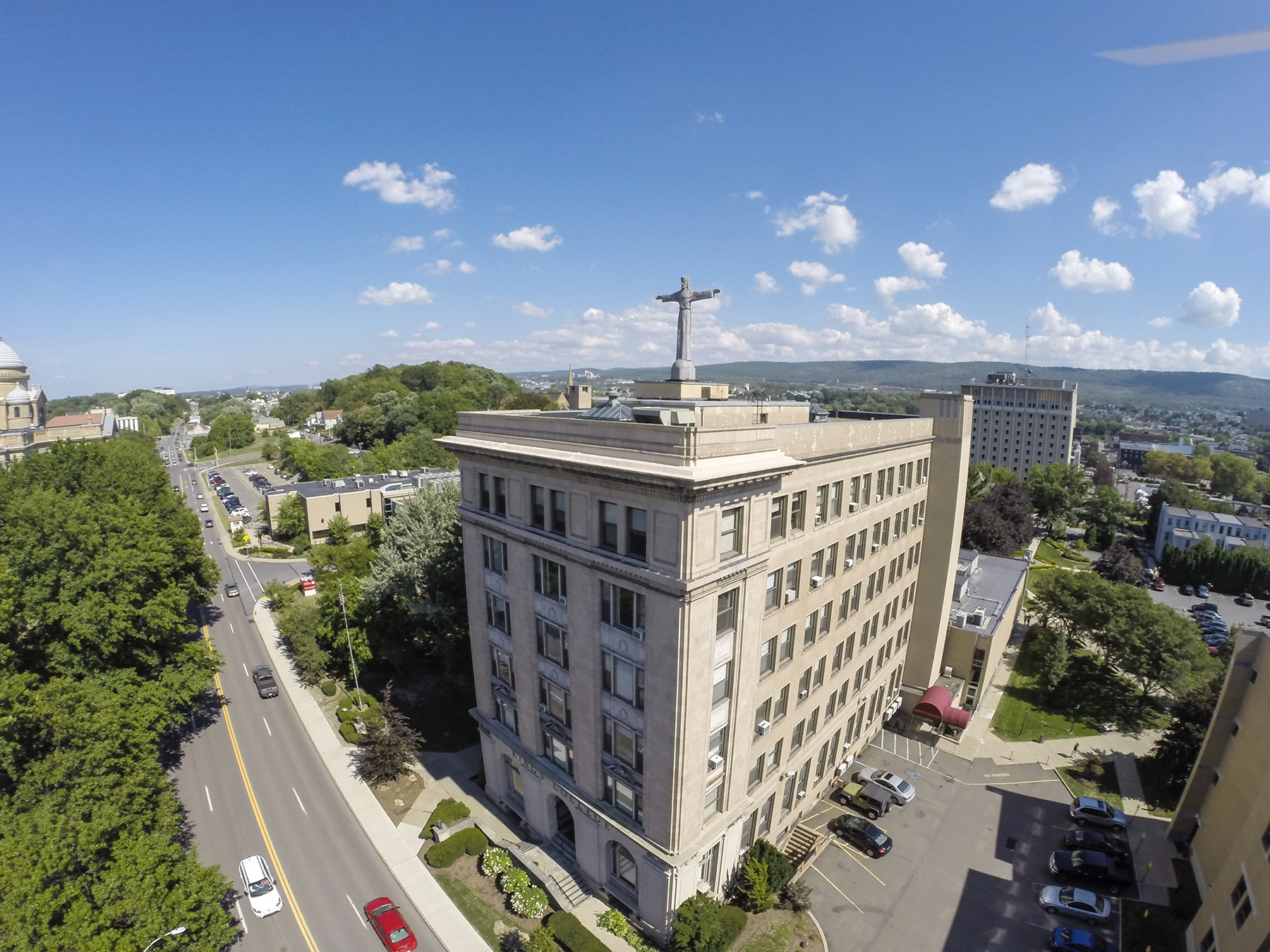
Administration Building at King's College in Wilkes-Barre, February 2013

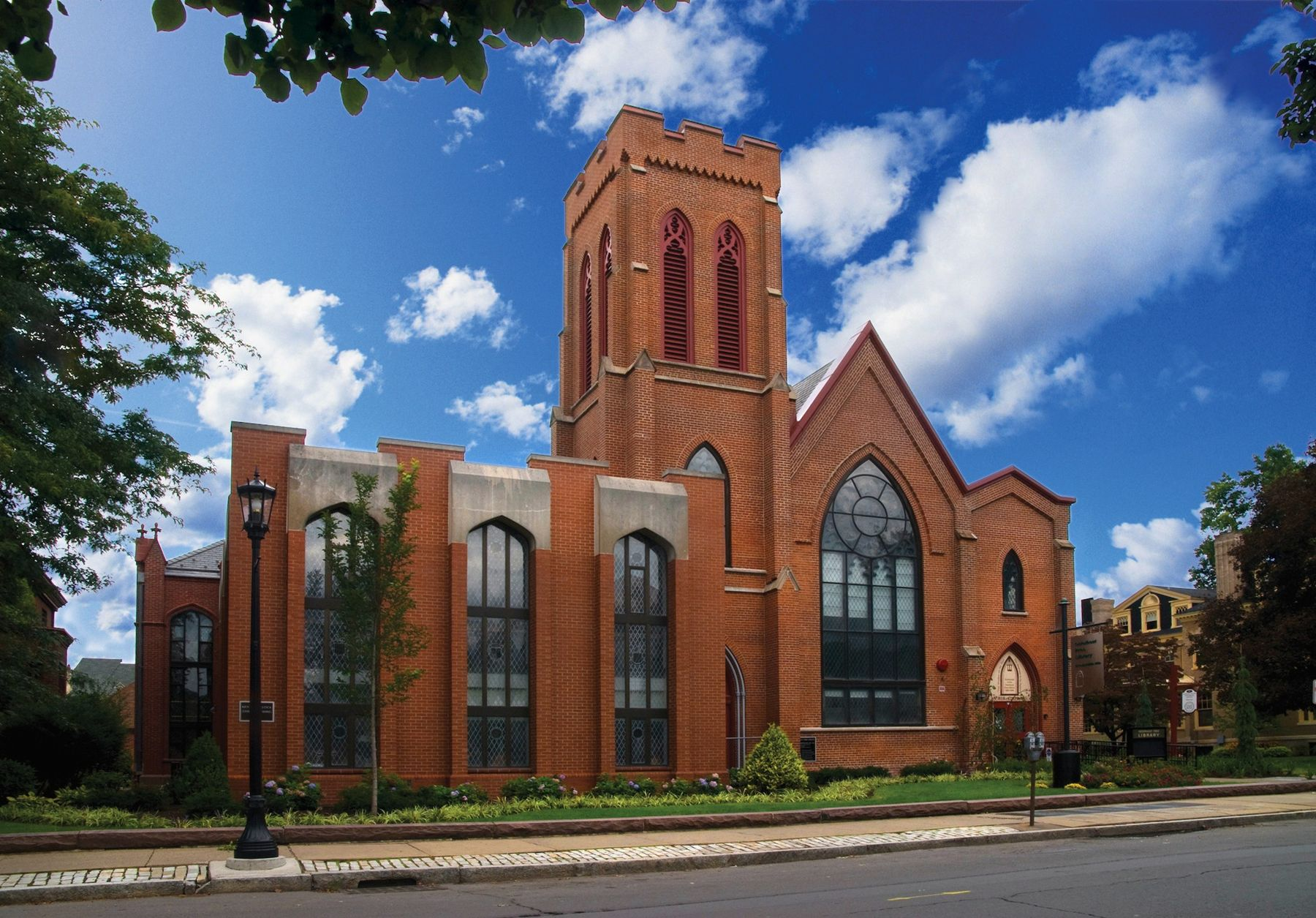
Osterhout Free Library in Wilkes-Barre, 2025

=== Public school districts ===
School districts include:

- Berwick Area School District (also in Columbia County)
- Crestwood School District
- Dallas School District
- Greater Nanticoke Area School District
- Hanover Area School District
- Hazleton Area School District (also in Carbon and Schuylkill Counties)
- Lake-Lehman School District (also in Wyoming County)
- Northwest Area School District
- Pittston Area School District
- Wilkes-Barre Area School District
- Wyoming Area School District (also in Wyoming County)
- Wyoming Valley West School District

=== Charter schools ===
- Bear Creek Community Charter School, Bear Creek Township

=== Public vocational technical schools ===
- West Side Career and Technology Center, Pringle

=== Private schools ===
- Graham Academy, Kingston
- Holy Cross High School, located in Lackawanna County; it serves Luzerne County residents
- Holy Redeemer High School, Wilkes-Barre
- Jenny Lynn Ferraro Academy, Kingston
- Milford E. Barnes Junior School, Wilkes-Barre
- MMI Preparatory School, Freeland
- New Story School, Wyoming
- Wilkes-Barre Academy, Wilkes-Barre
- Wyoming Seminary, Forty Fort and Kingston

=== Colleges and universities ===
- Geisinger Commonwealth School of Medicine, Wilkes-Barre
- King's College, Wilkes-Barre
- Luzerne County Community College, Nanticoke
- McCann School of Business & Technology, Wilkes-Barre
- Misericordia University, Dallas
- Penn State Hazleton, Hazleton
- Penn State Wilkes-Barre, Lehman Township
- Wilkes University, Wilkes-Barre

=== Libraries ===
The Luzerne County Library System includes the following locations:

- Back Mountain Memorial Library, Back Mountain
- Hazleton Area Public Library, Hazleton
- Hoyt Library, Kingston
- Marian Sutherland Kirby Library, Mountain Top
- Mill Memorial Library, Nanticoke
- Osterhout Free Library, Wilkes-Barre
- Pittston Memorial Library, Pittston
- Plymouth Public Library, Plymouth
- West Pittston Library, West Pittston
- Wyoming Free Library, Wyoming

== Culture ==
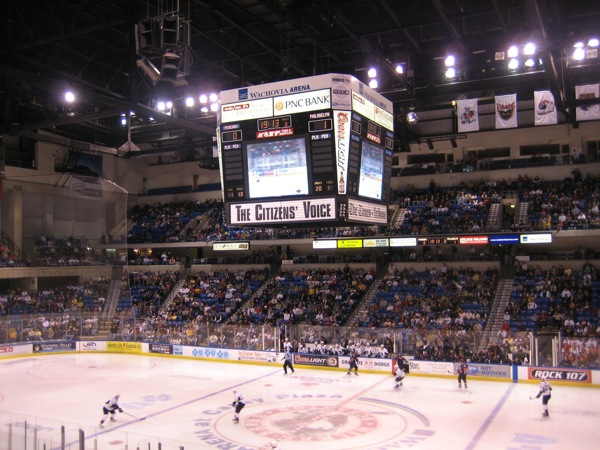
A Wilkes-Barre/Scranton Penguins hockey game at Mohegan Sun Arena

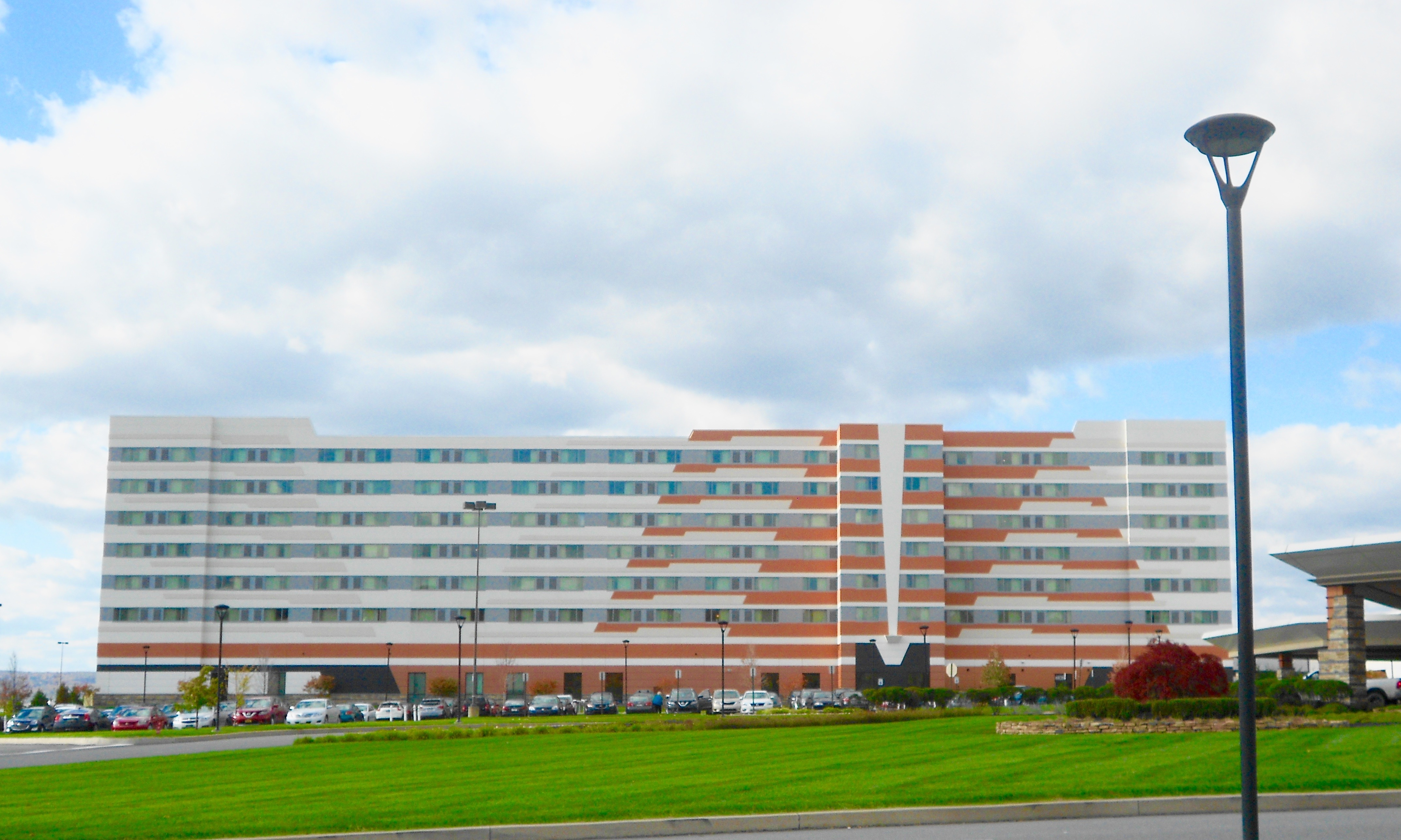
Mohegan Poconos hotel near the Mohegan Pennsylvania casino

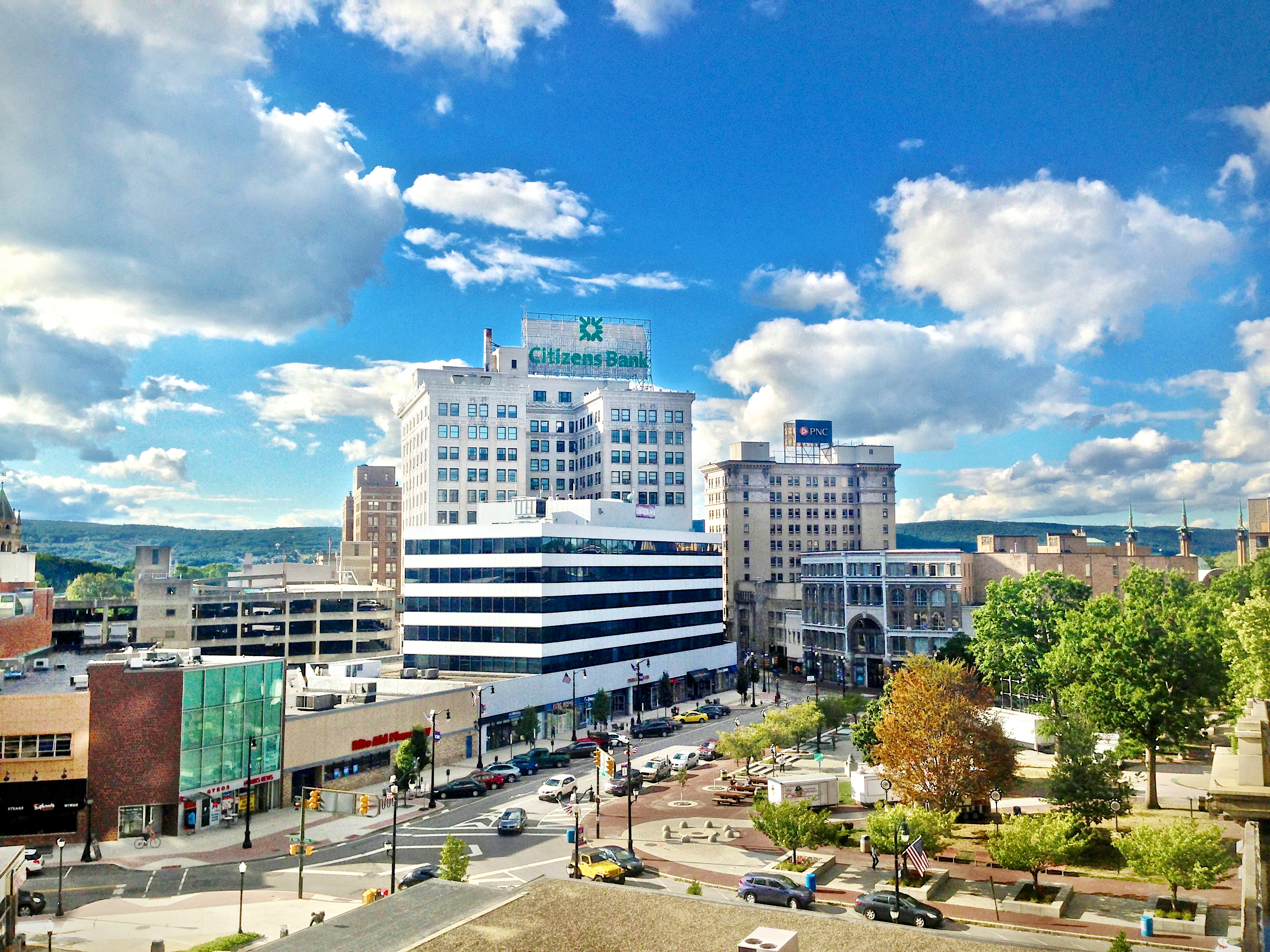
Wilkes-Barre's Public Square

=== Local attractions ===
- Bear Creek Village Historic District, Bear Creek Village
- Bittenbender Covered Bridge, Huntington Township
- Eckley Miners' Village, Foster Township
- F.M. Kirby Center for the Performing Arts, Wilkes-Barre
- Giants Despair Hillclimb, Laurel Run
- Kingston Armory, Kingston
- Little Theatre of Wilkes-Barre, Wilkes-Barre
- Luzerne County Museum, Wilkes-Barre
- Mohegan Sun Arena at Casey Plaza, Wilkes-Barre Township
- Mohegan Sun at Pocono Downs, Plains Township
- Public Square, Wilkes-Barre
- River Street Historic District, Wilkes-Barre
- Stegmaier Brewery, Wilkes-Barre
- Swetland Homestead, Wyoming
- Wilkes-Barre station, Wilkes-Barre
- Wyoming Monument, Wyoming
- Wyoming Valley Mall, Wilkes-Barre Township

=== Media ===
The Scranton/Wilkes-Barre area is the 55th-largest U.S. television market. Local television stations include: WNEP-TV (ABC affiliate), WBRE-TV (NBC affiliate), WYOU-TV (CBS affiliate), WVIA-TV (PBS affiliate), WOLF-TV (FOX affiliate), WQMY (MyNetworkTV affiliate), WSWB (CW affiliate), WQPX (Ion Television affiliate), and WYLN-LP (Youtoo TV affiliate).

Times Leader and The Citizens' Voice are the two largest daily newspapers in the Wilkes-Barre area. Wilkes-Barre's radio market is ranked No. 69 by Arbitron's ranking system. There are news, adult alternative, and music radio stations which are receivable in the area.

=== Sports ===
Team name	League	Sport	Venue
Wilkes-Barre/Scranton Penguins	AHL	Ice Hockey	Mohegan Sun Arena
Scranton/Wilkes-Barre Highlanders	IL	Baseball	PNC Field

== Transportation ==
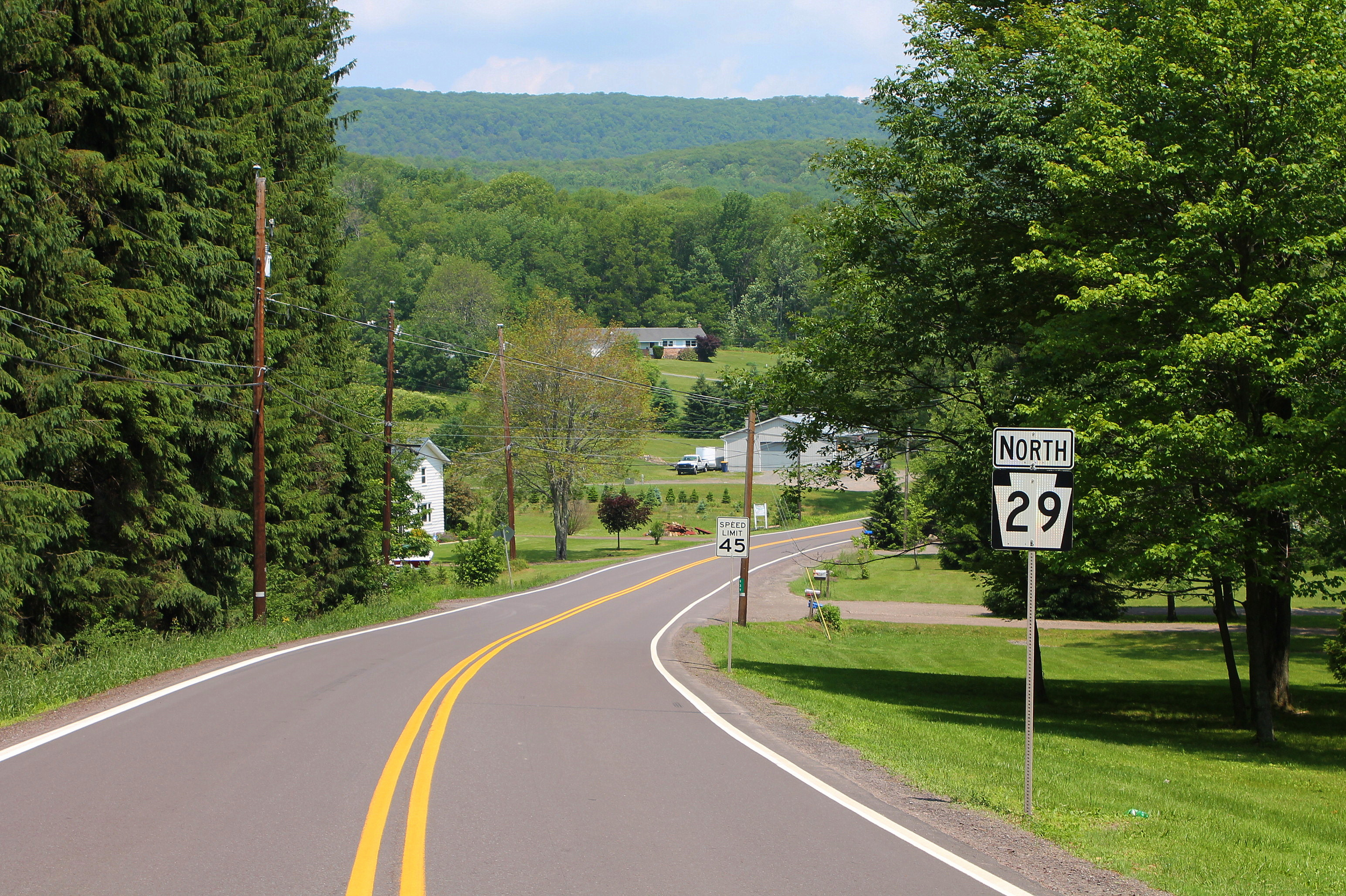
PA Route 29 in Lake Township

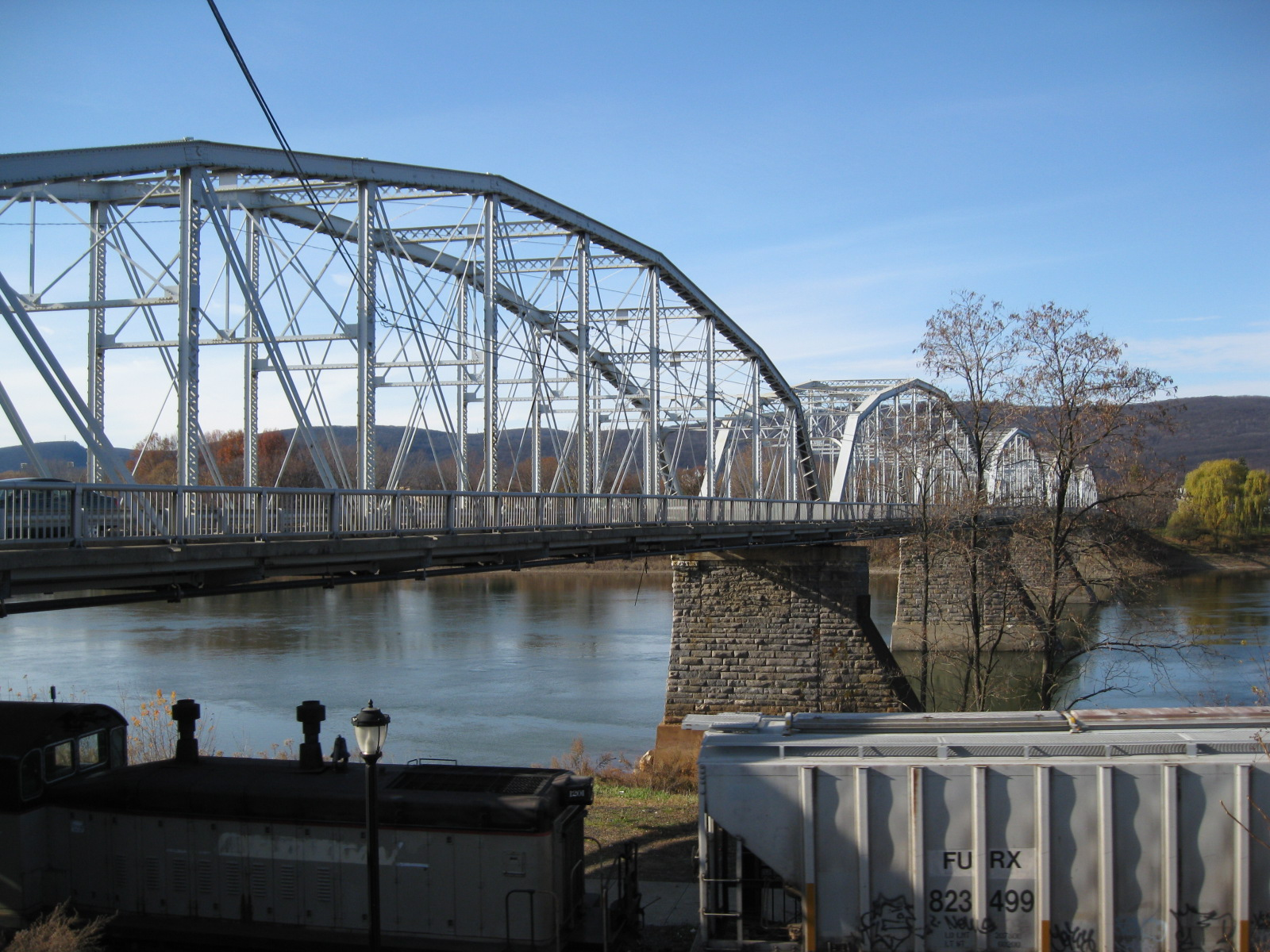
A train travels under Firefighters' Memorial Bridge in Pittston

=== Highways ===
- I-80
- I-81
- I-476 / Penna Turnpike NE Extension
- US 11
- PA 29
- PA 92
- PA 93
- PA 115
- PA 118
- PA 239
- PA 309
- PA 315
- PA 339
- PA 415
- PA 424
- PA 437
- PA 487
- PA 502
- PA 924
- PA 940

=== Railroads ===
- Canadian Pacific Railway (CP)
- Delaware and Hudson Railway (DH)
- Luzerne and Susquehanna Railway (LS)
- Norfolk Southern Railway (NS)
- North Shore Railroad (NSHR)
- Reading Blue Mountain and Northern Railroad (RBMN)

=== Airports ===
- Hazleton Municipal Airport
- Wilkes-Barre/Scranton International Airport
- Wilkes-Barre Wyoming Valley Airport
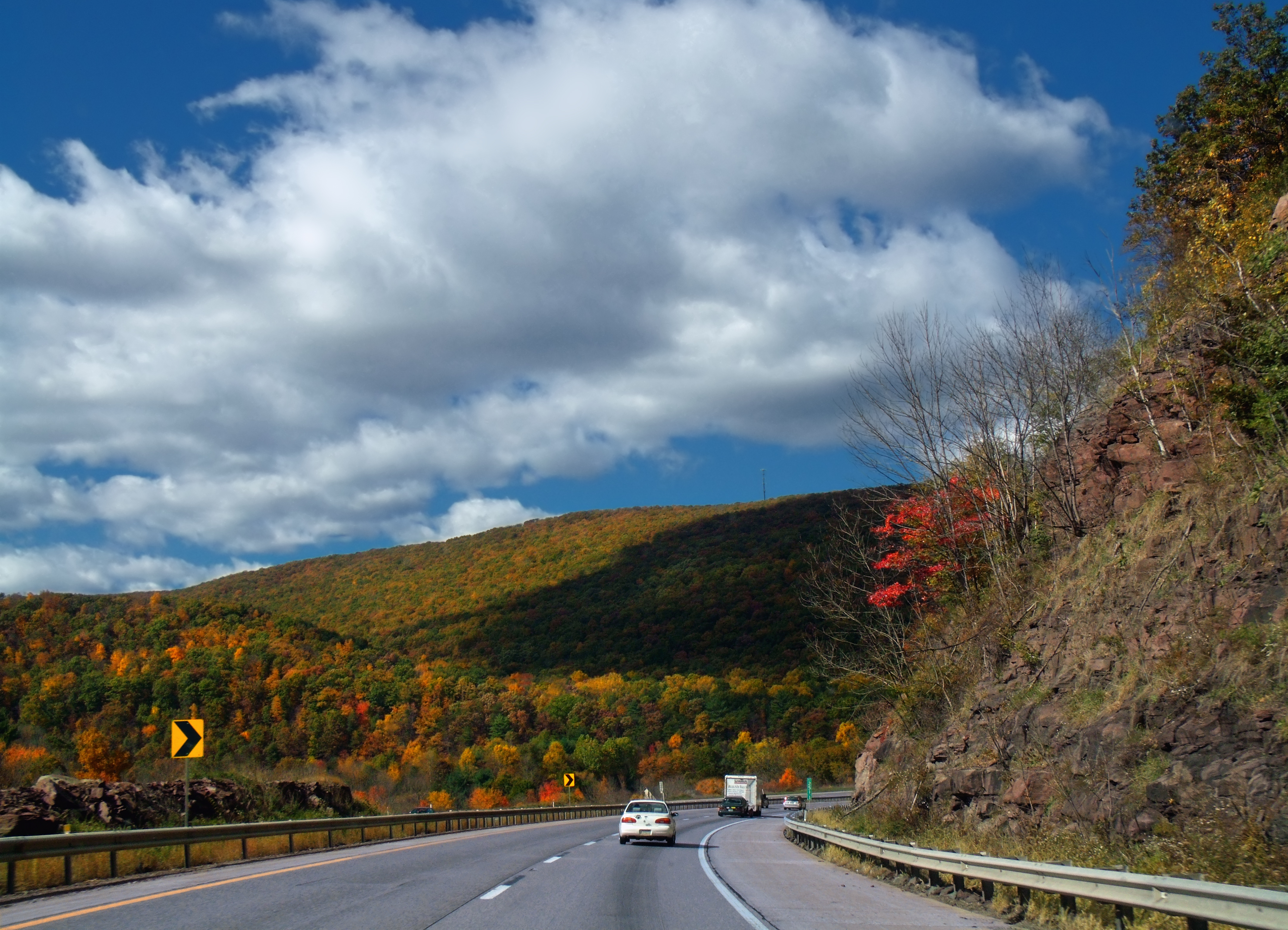
Interstate 80 in southern Luzerne County

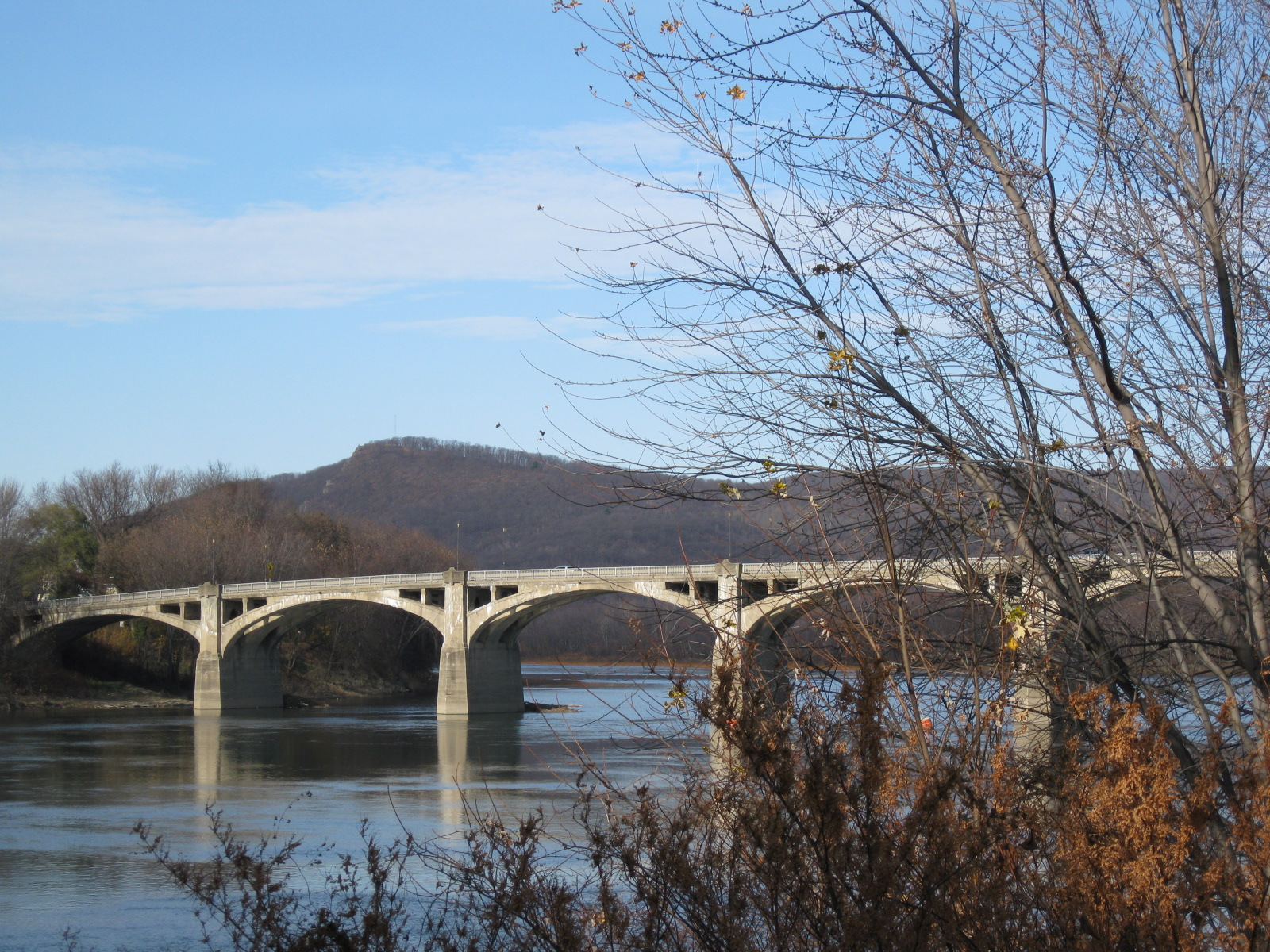
Specialist Dale J. Kridlo Bridge (U.S. Route 11)

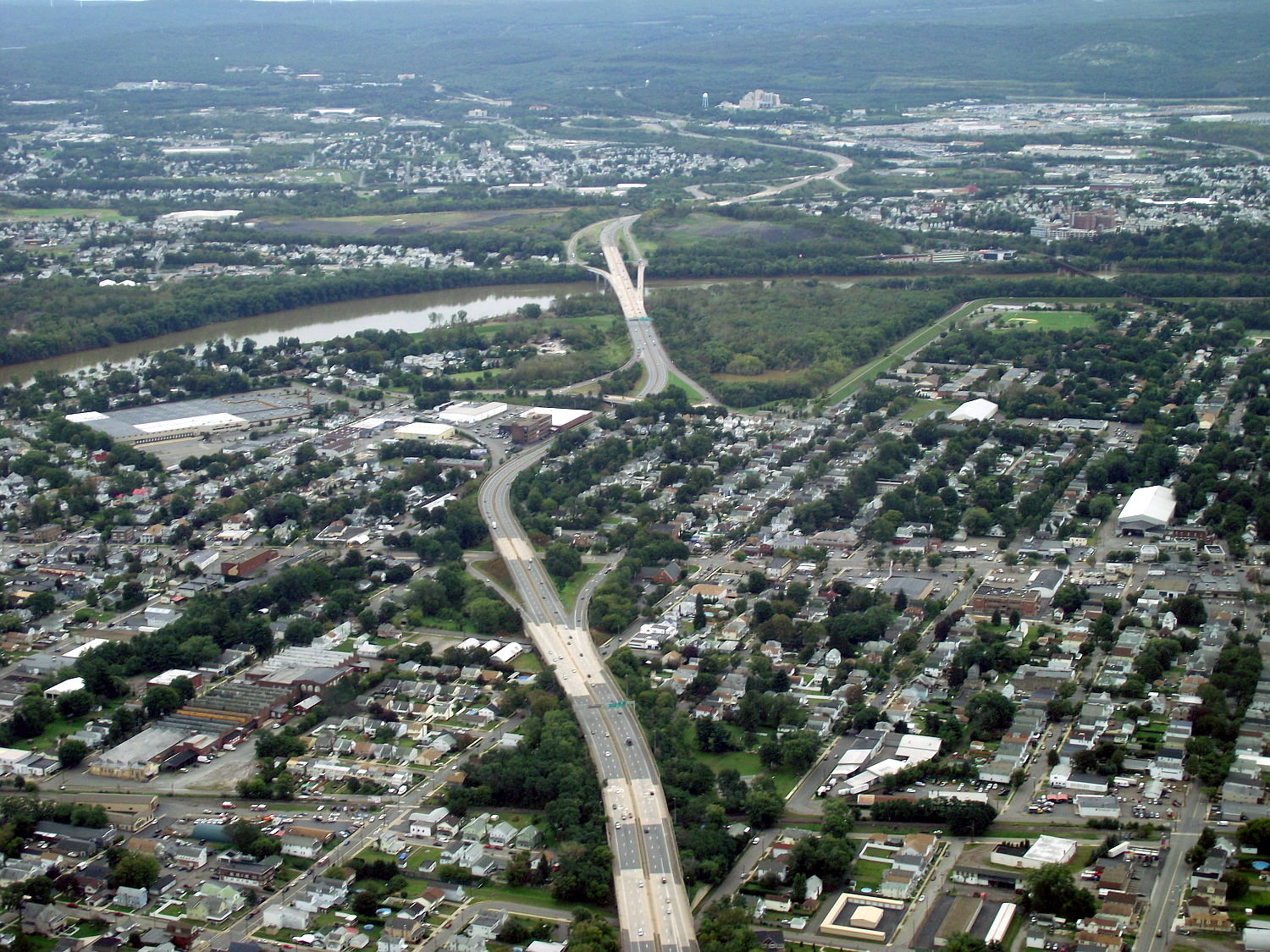
North Cross Valley Expressway (PA 309)

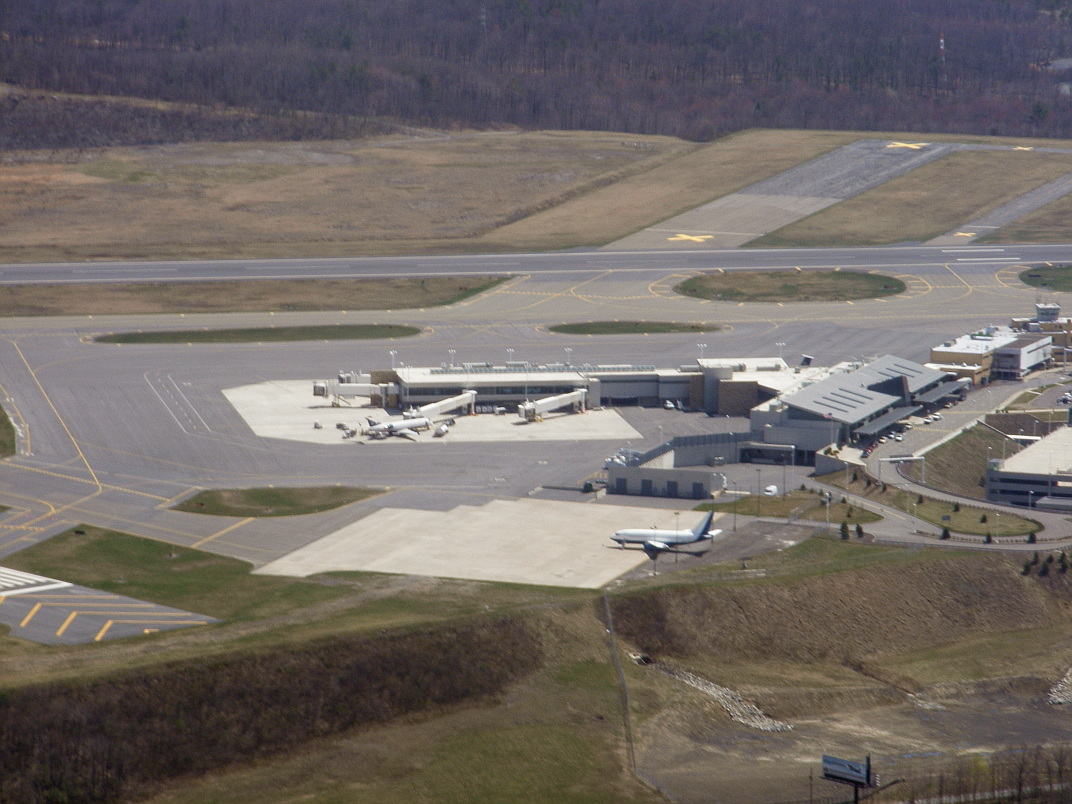
Wilkes-Barre/Scranton International Airport

== Communities ==
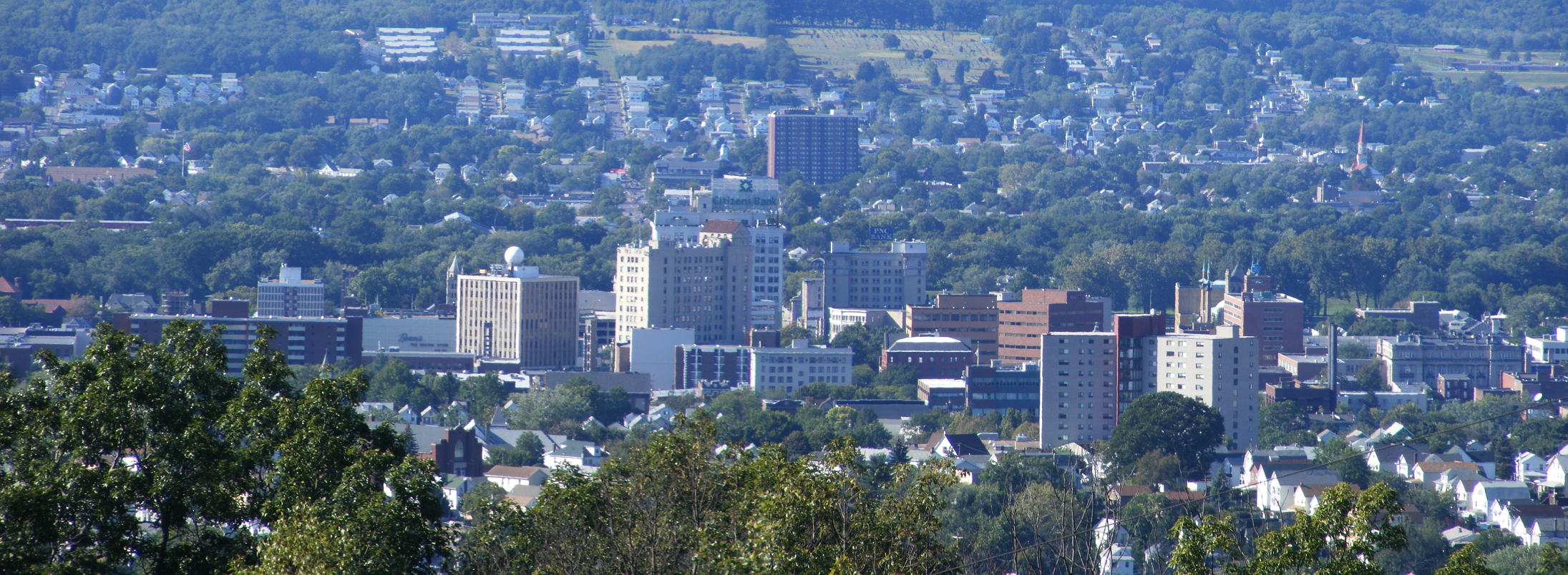
Wilkes-Barre, the county seat and largest city of Luzerne County

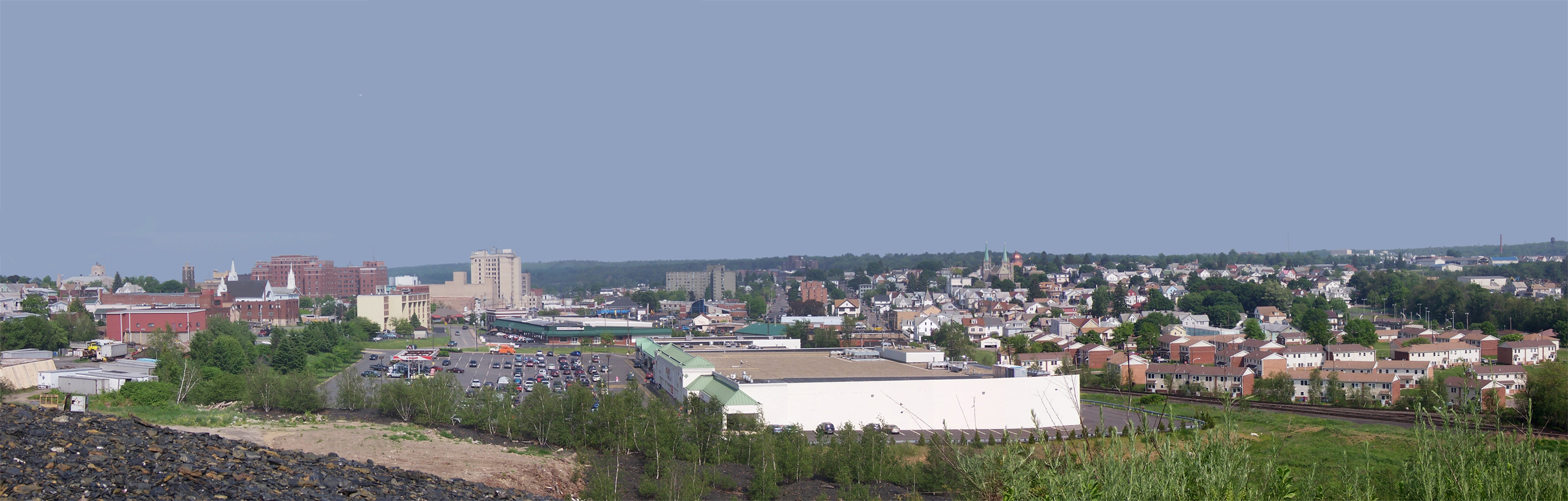
Hazleton, the second-largest city in Luzerne County

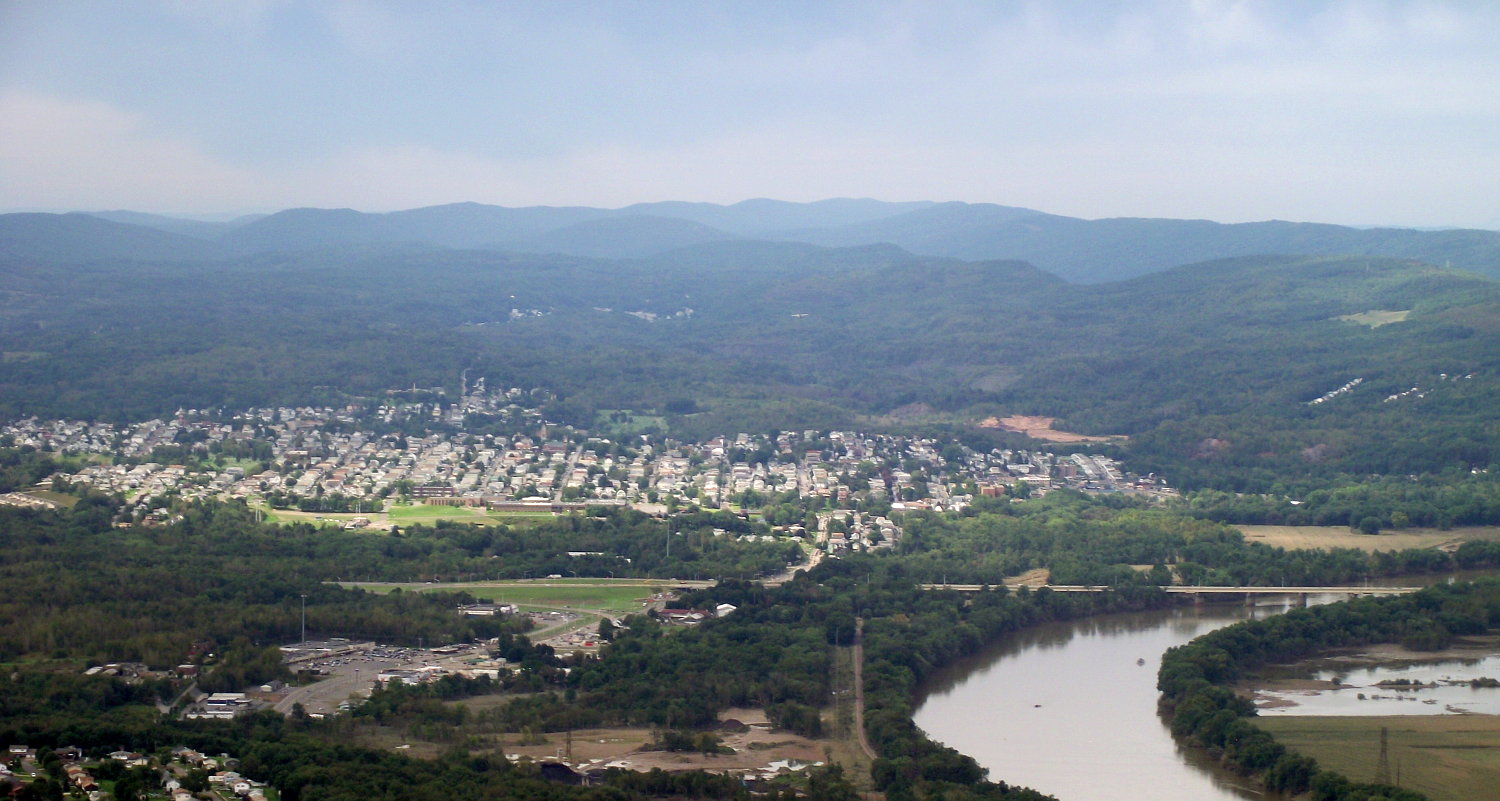
Nanticoke, the county's third-largest city

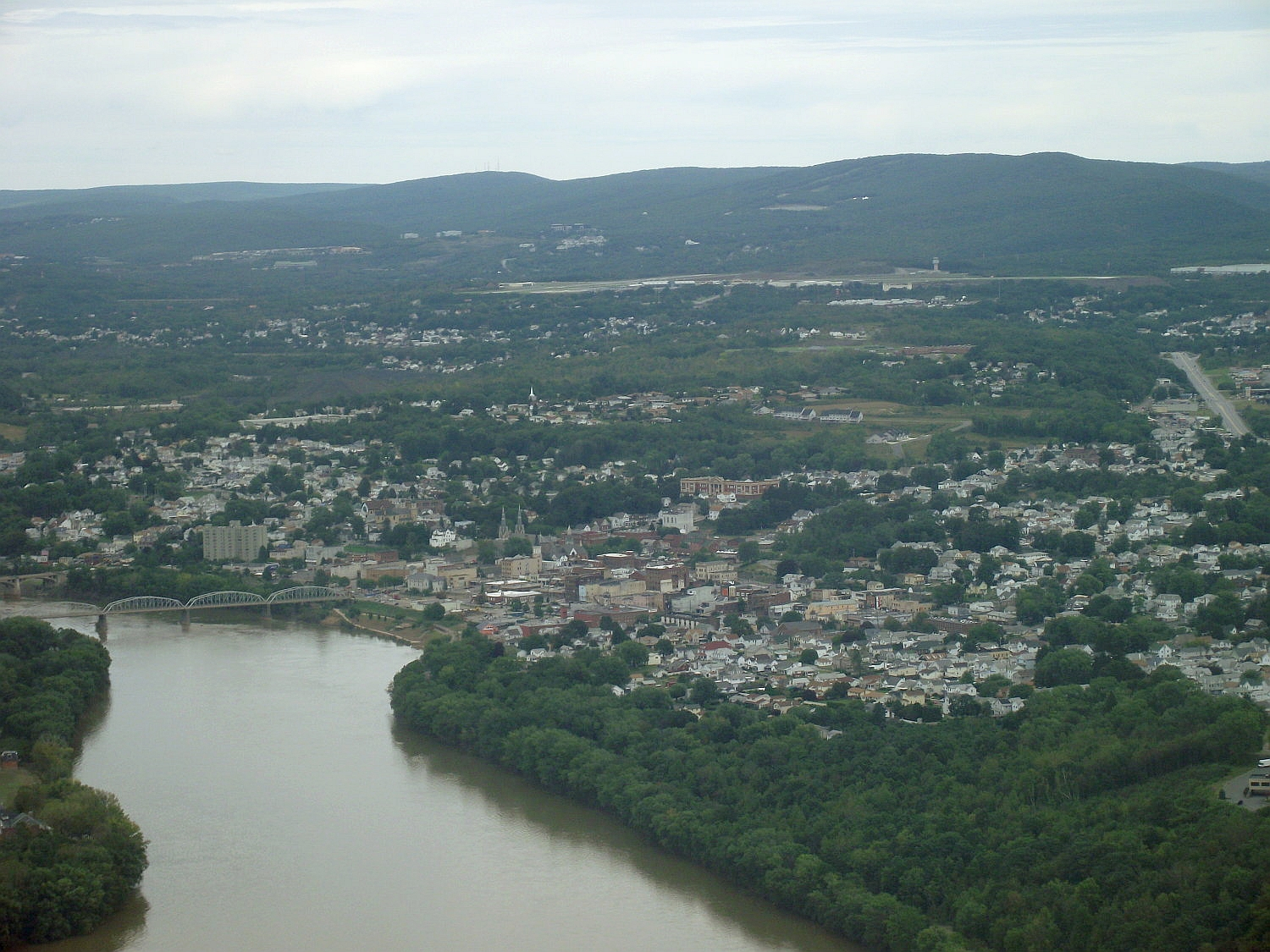
Pittston, the county's fourth-largest city

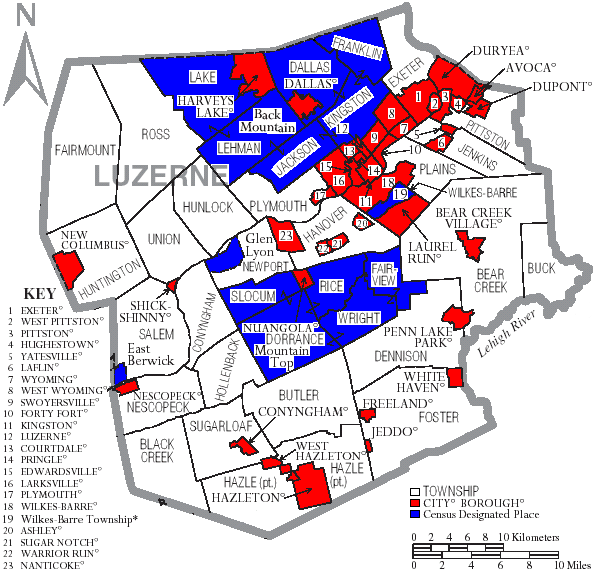
A map of Luzerne County with municipal labels showing cities and boroughs (in red), townships (in white), and census-designated places and regions (in blue)

Luzerne County contains the second highest number of independently governing municipalities in the state of Pennsylvania, with 76; only Allegheny County has more. Under Pennsylvania law, there are four types of incorporated municipalities: cities, boroughs, townships, and, in the case of Bloomsburg, towns. The following cities, boroughs, and townships are located in Luzerne County:

=== Cities ===
- Hazleton
- Nanticoke
- Pittston
- Wilkes-Barre (county seat)

=== Boroughs ===
- Ashley
- Avoca
- Bear Creek Village
- Conyngham
- Courtdale
- Dallas
- Dupont
- Duryea
- Edwardsville
- Exeter
- Forty Fort
- Freeland
- Harveys Lake
- Hughestown
- Jeddo
- Kingston
- Laflin
- Larksville
- Laurel Run
- Luzerne
- Nescopeck
- New Columbus
- Nuangola
- Penn Lake Park
- Plymouth
- Pringle
- Shickshinny
- Sugar Notch
- Swoyersville
- Warrior Run
- West Hazleton
- West Pittston
- West Wyoming
- White Haven
- Wyoming
- Yatesville

=== Townships ===
- Bear Creek
- Black Creek
- Buck
- Butler
- Conyngham
- Dallas
- Dennison
- Dorrance
- Exeter
- Fairmount
- Fairview
- Foster
- Franklin
- Hanover
- Hazle
- Hollenback
- Hunlock
- Huntington
- Jackson
- Jenkins
- Kingston
- Lake
- Lehman
- Nescopeck
- Newport
- Pittston
- Plains
- Plymouth
- Rice
- Ross
- Salem
- Slocum
- Sugarloaf
- Union
- Wilkes-Barre
- Wright

=== Census-designated places ===
Census-designated places are geographical areas designated by the U.S. Census Bureau for the purposes of compiling demographic data. They are not actual jurisdictions under Pennsylvania law.

- Beech Mountain Lakes
- Browntown
- Chase
- East Berwick
- Georgetown
- Glen Lyon
- Harleigh
- Hickory Hills
- Hilldale
- Hudson
- Inkerman
- Lattimer
- Misericordia University
- Mocanaqua
- Mountain Top
- Nuremberg
- Pardeesville
- Pikes Creek
- Plains
- Shavertown
- Sheatown
- Silkworth
- Trucksville
- Upper Exeter
- Wanamie
- West Nanticoke
- Weston

=== Other places ===
- Alden
- Back Mountain
- Beach Haven
- Breslau
- Cambra
- Cranberry
- Drifton
- Drums
- Ebervale
- Glen Summit Springs
- Greater Pittston
- Harveyville
- Humboldt
- Hunlock Creek
- Huntington Mills
- Japan
- Kis-Lyn
- Koonsville
- Korn Krest
- Kunkle
- Lehman
- Milnesville
- Moosehead
- Mossville
- Mountain Grove
- Old Boston
- Port Griffith
- Rock Glen
- Saint Johns
- Sandy Run
- Suscon
- Sweet Valley
- Sybertsville
- Tomhicken
- Wapwallopen
- Waterton
- Zenith

=== Population ranking ===
The population ranking of the following table is based on the 2020 census of Luzerne County.

† county seat

Rank	City/Borough/Township	Municipal type	Population (2020 census)
1	† Wilkes-Barre	City	44,328
2	Hazleton	City	29,963
3	Kingston	Borough	13,349
4	Hanover Township	Township	11,424
5	Nanticoke	City	10,628
6	Hazle Township	Township	10,150
7	Plains Township	Township	9,816
8	Butler Township	Township	9,469
9	Dallas Township	Township	9,099
10	Pittston	City	7,591
11	Kingston Township	Township	7,096
12	Plymouth	Borough	5,763
13	Wright Township	Township	5,726
14	Exeter	Borough	5,513
15	West Hazleton	Borough	5,167
16	Duryea	Borough	5,032
17	Swoyersville	Borough	5,008
18	Edwardsville	Borough	4,918
19	Jackson Township	Township	4,761
20	Fairview Township	Township	4,691
21	West Pittston	Borough	4,652
22	Newport Township	Township	4,444
23	Jenkins Township	Township	4,282
24	Forty Fort	Borough	4,239
25	Larksville	Borough	4,225
26	Salem Township	Township	4,019
27	Sugarloaf Township	Township	3,879
28	Freeland	Borough	3,833
29	Rice Township	Township	3,626
30	Foster Township	Township	3,413
31	Lehman Township	Township	3,342
32	Wilkes-Barre Township	Township	3,219
33	Pittston Township	Township	3,179
34	Wyoming	Borough	3,102
35	Harveys Lake	Borough	2,786
36	Bear Creek Township	Township	2,752
37	Ross Township	Township	2,719
38	Luzerne	Borough	2,703
39	Dallas	Borough	2,692
40	West Wyoming	Borough	2,631
41	Ashley	Borough	2,590
42	Dupont	Borough	2,536
43	Avoca	Borough	2,507
44	Hunlock Township	Township	2,215
45	Dorrance Township	Township	2,077
46	Huntington Township	Township	2,052
47	Exeter Township	Township	2,047
48	Union Township	Township	2,033
49	Lake Township	Township	1,994
50	Black Creek Township	Township	1,904
51	Conyngham	Borough	1,825
52	Franklin Township	Township	1,712
53	Plymouth Township	Township	1,710
54	Nescopeck	Borough	1,480
55	Laflin	Borough	1,443
56	Hughestown	Borough	1,326
57	Conyngham Township	Township	1,309
58	Fairmount Township	Township	1,207
59	White Haven	Borough	1,163
60	Hollenback Township	Township	1,125
61	Nescopeck Township	Township	1,080
62	Slocum Township	Township	1,053
63	Sugar Notch	Borough	996
64	Dennison Township	Township	961
65	Pringle	Borough	893
66	Courtdale	Borough	689
67	Nuangola	Borough	663
68	Yatesville	Borough	638
69	Shickshinny	Borough	632
70	Laurel Run	Borough	560
71	Warrior Run	Borough	528
72	Buck Township	Township	378
73	Penn Lake Park	Borough	359
74	Bear Creek Village	Borough	290
75	New Columbus	Borough	222
76	Jeddo	Borough	108

== See also ==
- Luzerne County Transportation Authority
- National Register of Historic Places listings in Luzerne County, Pennsylvania
- Pennamite–Yankee War
- USS Luzerne County
