= Browntown, Luzerne County, Pennsylvania =

Unincorporated community in Pennsylvania, US

Browntown, Pennsylvania
- Census-designated place
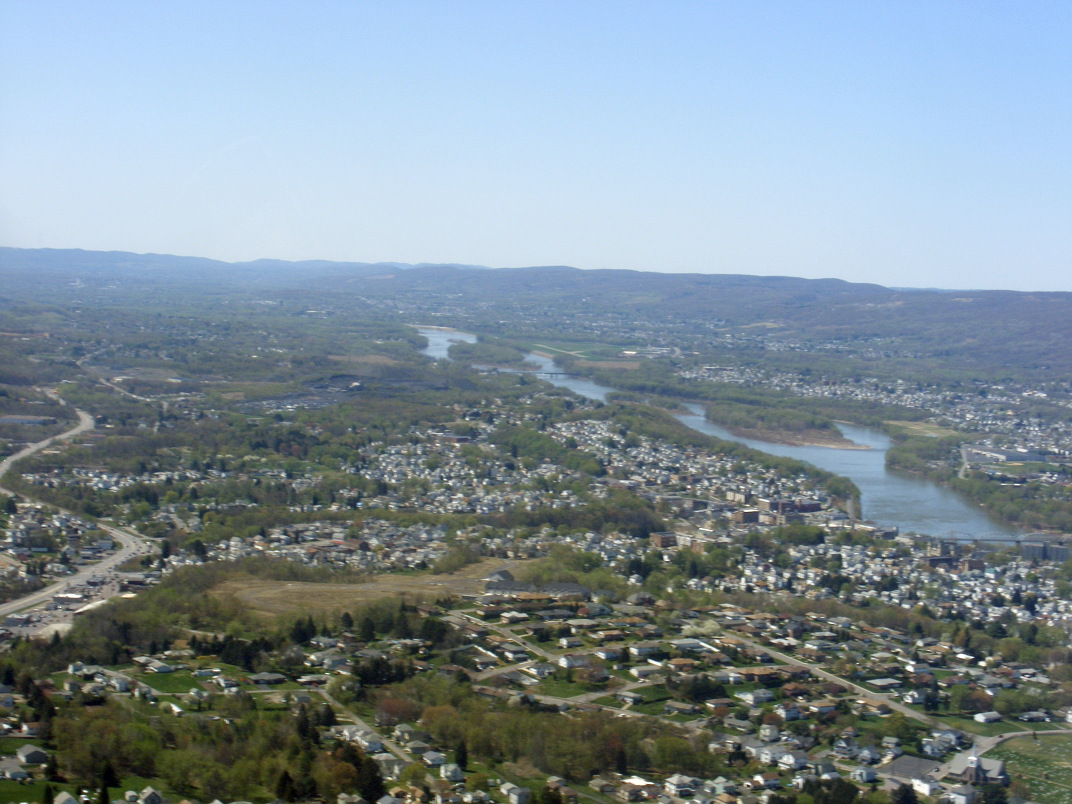
- Aerial view of Greater Pittston. Browntown, Pittston Township, can be seen in the center-left of the image.

- Location in Pennsylvania Location in the United States
- Coordinates: 41°18′46″N 75°47′8″W
- Country: United States
- State: Pennsylvania
- County: Luzerne
- Township: Pittston

Area
  - Total: 0.46 sq mi (1.2 km^{2})
  - Land: 0.46 sq mi (1.2 km^{2})
  - Water: 0 sq mi (0 km^{2})

Population (2010)
  - Total: 1,418
  - Density: 3,100/sq mi (1,200/km^{2})
- Time zone: UTC-5 (Eastern (EST))
  - Summer (DST): UTC-4 (EDT)
- ZIP code: 18640
- Area code: 570

Browntown is a census-designated place (CDP) in Pittston Township, Pennsylvania, United States, adjacent to Pittston City. The CDP population was 1,418 at the 2010 census.

== Geography ==
Browntown is located at 41°18′46″N 75°47′8″W.

According to the United States Census Bureau, the CDP has a total area of 0.46 square miles (1.2 km^{2}), all land. Browntown is adjacent to the southeast border of Pittston City. The borough of Yatesville is to the south, and Hughestown is to the north. U.S. 11 passes through the northern part of the CDP.

== Education ==
It is in the Pittston Area School District.
