= Pittston Township, Pennsylvania =

Township in Pennsylvania, US

Coordinates: 41°18′00″N 75°42′59″W

- Township
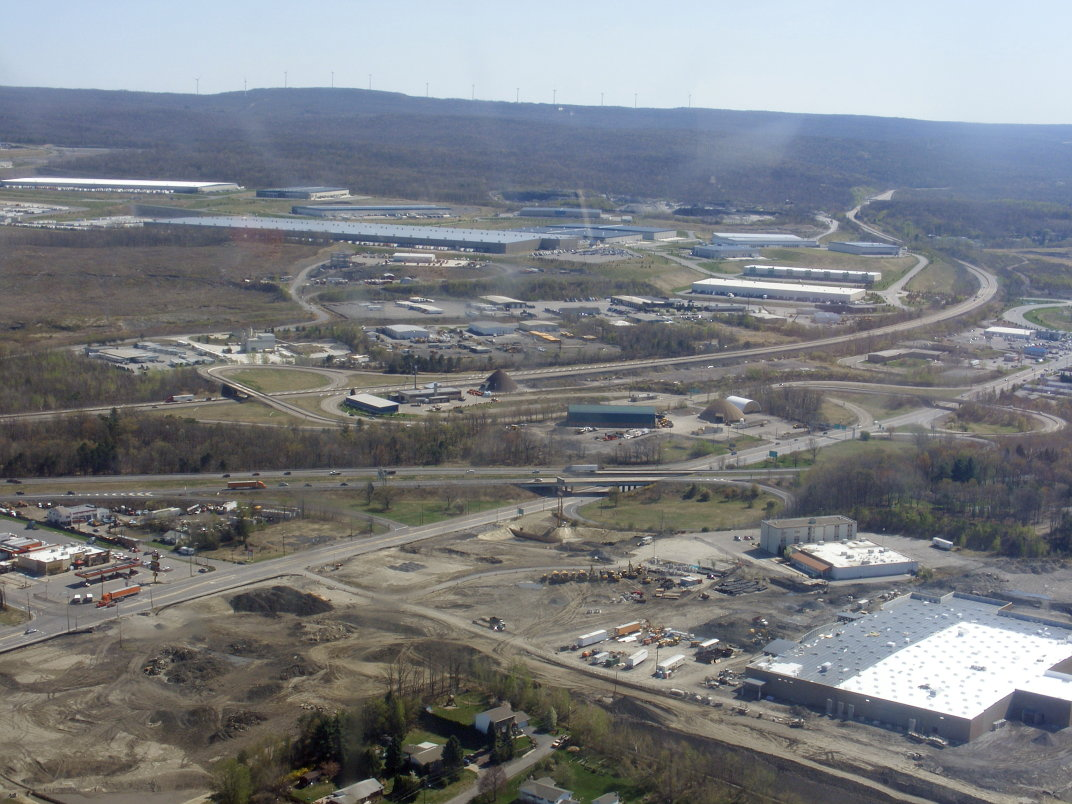
- Aerial view of the township's industrial and commercial districts

- Seal

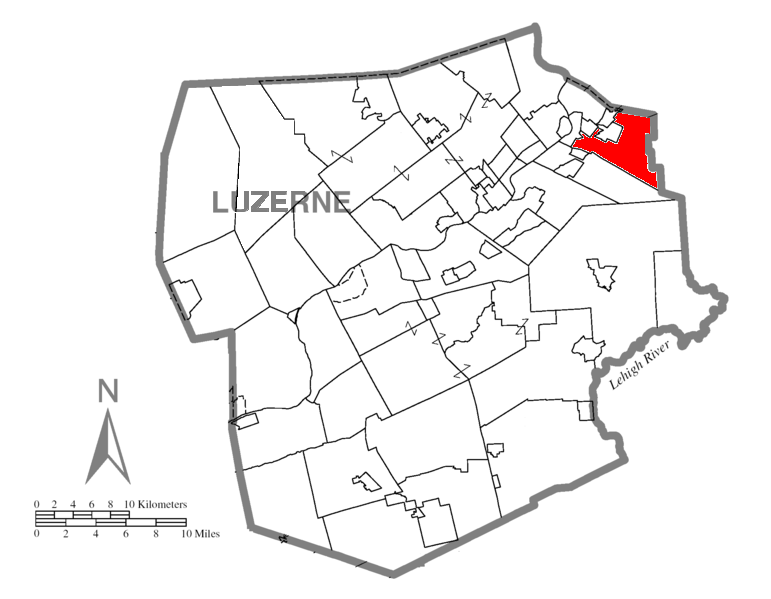
- Location of Pittston Township in Luzerne County, Pennsylvania

- Location of Luzerne County in Pennsylvania
- Country: United States
- State: Pennsylvania
- County: Luzerne
- Region: Greater Pittston
- Settled: 18th century
- Established: 1790

Government
  - Type: Board of supervisors
  - Supervisor: Joseph Hawk
  - Supervisor: Deborah Taroli
  - Supervisor: David Slezak

Area
  - Total: 13.79 sq mi (35.71 km^{2})
  - Land: 13.77 sq mi (35.66 km^{2})
  - Water: 0.019 sq mi (0.05 km^{2})

Population (2020)
  - Total: 3,179 ▼
  - Estimate (2021): 3,179
  - Density: 245.9/sq mi (94.94/km^{2})
- Time zone: UTC-5 (Eastern (EST))
  - Summer (DST): UTC-4 (EDT)
- FIPS code: 42-079-61056
- Website: pittstontownship.org

Pittston Township is a township in Luzerne County, Pennsylvania. The population was 3,179 as of the 2020 census. The township is located within the Greater Pittston region. As of 2010, the total population of Greater Pittston was 48,020. The Wilkes-Barre/Scranton International Airport is located in Pittston Township.

== History ==
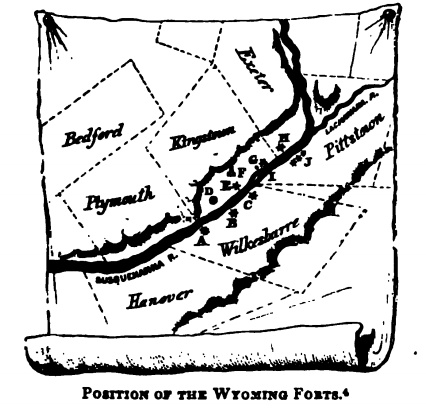
A 1778 map of Wyoming Valley forts; "G" represents the battlefield of Wyoming; and "J" represents Fort Pittstown or the Pittstown stockades.

=== Establishment ===
Pittston Township was one of the five original townships formed under the Susquehanna Land Company of Connecticut (in the Wyoming Valley). It was originally known as Pittstown (named for Sir William Pitt, an English statesman). Each township was originally five square miles and divided amongst forty settlers. The township was surveyed in 1768. But, in 1784, flood waters destroyed the surveyor's marks and an act was passed for a new survey to take place. After being resurveyed, the township grew to nearly thirty-six square miles.

Zebulon Marcy was the first white settler to build a brush (or log) cabin in the township. Some may refer to him as the first settler. The other leading families in the township (prior to and during the American Revolution) were the Blanchards, Browns, Careys, Bennetts, Silsbeys, Marceys, Benedicts, St. Johns, Sawyers, and Coopers. Reverend Benedict was the first preacher in the locality. Captain Jeremiah Blanchard Sr. commanded the Pittston Company.

During the Revolutionary War, British and American forces clashed within the Wyoming Valley. On the morning of July 4, 1778—after the surrender of Forty Fort to the British—British Officer Butler sent a detachment across the river to Pittston and demanded the surrender of Fort Brown, which was commanded by Captain Blanchard. The fort capitulated on fair terms.

The first sawmill in the township was built near the mouth of the Lackawanna in 1780 by Solomon Finn and E. L. Stevens. Dr. Nathaniel Giddings was the first physician in the township. He came from Connecticut in 1787, and practiced medicine in the community until his death in 1851. He also set up one of the first orchards in the township.

=== Coal mining ===
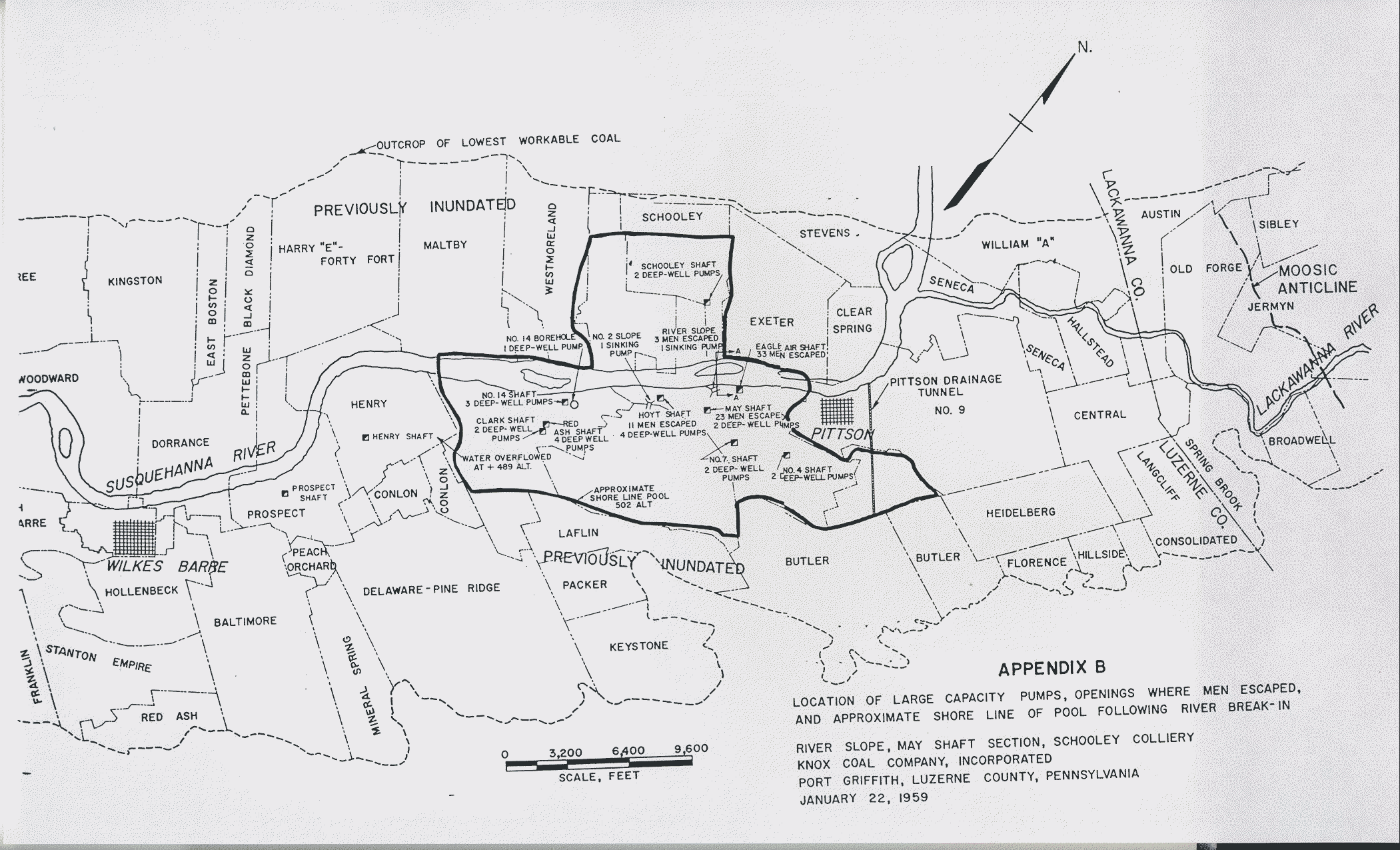
Map of the Knox Mine disaster showing the inundated area and the shafts used for escape and dewatering

For sixty years, the Yankee element predominated the population of the township. When coal was discovered, a great migration of various European nationalities began. This influx is responsible for the heterogeneous population found in the township today. The coal interests soon became the largest source of wealth in the township (although there was some valuable farmland in the small valleys). Col. James W. Johnson was one of the pioneers in the mining and shipping of coal. He sent considerable quantities down the river in "arks" when this was the only mode of transportation.

McCarthyville, popularly known as Cork Lane, was once a mining village in Pittston Township. In 1892, the community consisted of 900 inhabitants and 140 dwellings. Browntown, which neighbors Cork Lane, was another mining community in the township. In 1892, it consisted of nearly 1,000 residents and 200 dwellings. Pittston Township remained an active mining community for many decades. However, on January 22, 1959, the Knox Mine Disaster (in nearby Port Griffith) shattered the industry when the Susquehanna River broke through and flooded most of the interconnected mines in the area.

=== Airport ===
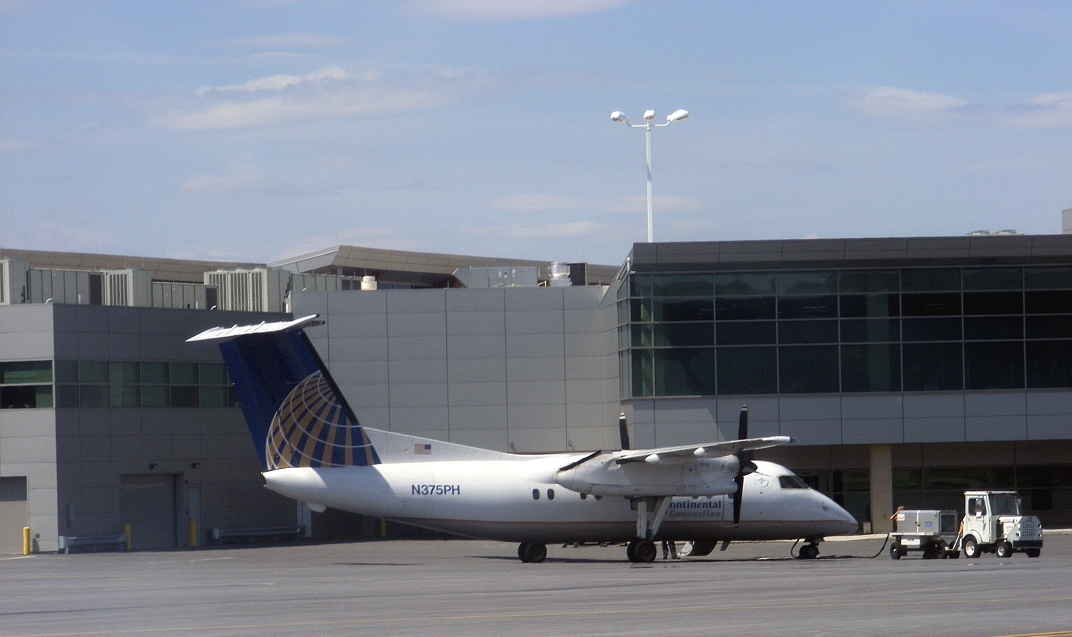
The Wilkes-Barre/Scranton International Airport in Pittston Township.

As the United States entered the age of mass air transportation, Scranton and Wilkes-Barre (the largest cities in Northeast Pennsylvania) recognized the need for a large-scale airport. Despite the Great Depression and hard times affecting the local coal mining industry, a windfall multimillion-dollar opportunity to plan and build a regional airport was presented to the counties of Luzerne and Lackawanna through their Public Works Administration. It became apparent that a modern airport would be needed for the economic survival of the region. The site in and around Pittston Township was first surveyed in 1939 by the county commissioners of both counties.

In 1941, John B. McDade, president of the Heidelberg Coal Company and father of Congressman Joseph M. McDade, donated 122 acres on which part of the airport now sits. Most of the land was previously owned by various coal companies. By 1945, the two counties entered into a legal agreement to co-sponsor and operate the airport. Between 1945 and 1947, construction of the Wilkes-Barre/Scranton International Airport took place in and around Pittston Township. Today, the airport is known as the “Gateway to Northeastern Pennsylvania and the Pocono Mountains.” It is the fifth busiest airport in Pennsylvania.

On April 20, 1985, a CT-39 Sabreliner crashed while attempting to land at the Wilkes-Barre/Scranton International Airport; this resulted in the deaths of all five people on board (including General Jerome F. O'Malley, the commander of Tactical Air Command).

=== "Kids for cash" scandal ===
The “kids for cash” scandal unfolded in 2008 over judicial kickbacks at the Luzerne County Court of Common Pleas in Wilkes-Barre. Two judges, President Judge Mark Ciavarella and Senior Judge Michael Conahan, were convicted of accepting money from Robert Mericle, builder of two private, for-profit youth centers for the detention of juveniles, in return for contracting with the facilities and imposing harsh adjudications on juveniles brought before their courts to increase the number of residents in the centers. One such center was PA Child Care in Pittston Township.

=== Tornado ===
An EF2 tornado struck Suscon (Pittston Township) on Saturday, February 25, 2017. This was the first recorded tornado in February for Luzerne County. The tornado generated top wind speeds of 120 mph (190 km/h), had a maximum width of 641 yd (586 m), and traveled 12.8 mi (20.6 km).

== Geography ==
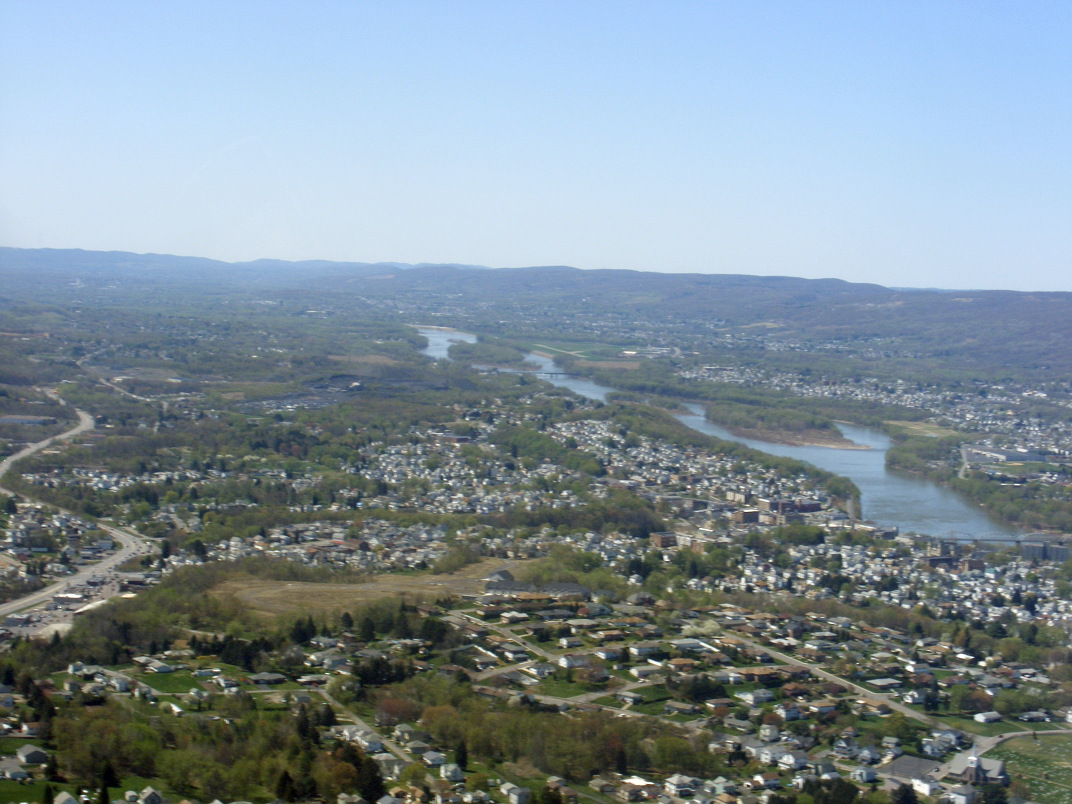
An image of Greater Pittston. Pittston Township can be seen on the far left.

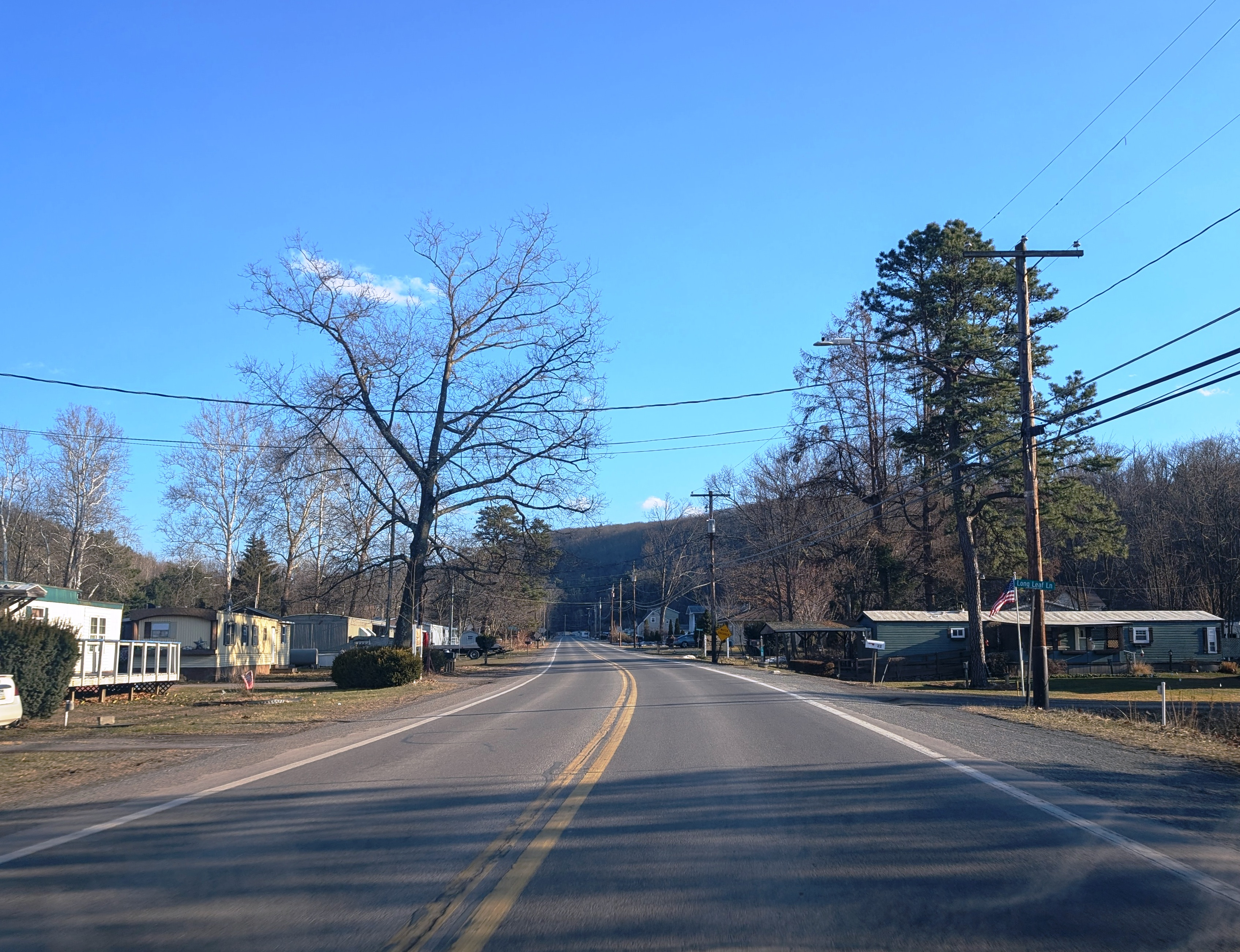
Village of Glendale in Pittston Township

According to the United States Census Bureau, the township has a total area of 13.79 square miles (35.71 km^{2}), of which 13.77 square miles (35.66 km^{2}) is land and 0.02 square miles (0.05 km^{2}), or 0.15%, is water. It is the second largest community by area in Greater Pittston. The township is served by the Pittston Area School District. The eastern part of the township is made up of mountains and forests. Most of the township's residents and businesses are located in the western half of the town. The elevation ranges from 2,130 feet (650 m) above sea level at the summit of Little Shiney Mountain in the southeastern corner of the township to 630 feet (190 m) in several valleys along the western border, near the Susquehanna River.

Its villages include Browntown, Cork Lane, Glendale, and Suscon. Its numbered routes are U.S. Route 11, Interstate 81, Interstate 476, Route 315, and Route 502. The interstate highways connect with each other via Route 315 at the Wyoming Valley Interchange just east of Browntown. Suscon Road crosses the township from northwest to southeast, connecting the borough of Dupont with Thornhurst on the Lehigh River. Oak Street and William Street (Route 11) connect the township with the city of Pittston. There is also an international airport in the community. The Wilkes-Barre/Scranton International Airport is located in northern Pittston Township.

=== Villages of Pittston Township ===
- Browntown: 1,418 residents; 0.5 square miles
- Cork Lane
- Glendale
- Suscon

== Demographics ==
Historical population
Census	Pop.	Note	%±
2000	3,450		—
2010	3,368		−2.4%
2020	3,179		−5.6%
2021 (est.)	3,179		0.0%
U.S. Decennial Census

As of the census of 2000, there were 3,450 people, 1,340 households, and 975 families residing in the township. The population density was 240.2 inhabitants per square mile (92.7/km^{2}). There were 1,437 housing units at an average density of 100.1 per square mile (38.6/km^{2}). The racial makeup of the township was 99.16% White, 0.29% African American, 0.09% Asian, 0.06% from other races, and 0.41% from two or more races. Hispanic or Latino of any race were 0.35% of the population.

There were 1,340 households, out of which 27.5% had children under the age of 18 living with them, 55.7% were married couples living together, 12.1% had a female householder with no husband present, and 27.2% were non-families. 24.4% of all households were made up of individuals, and 12.5% had someone living alone who was 65 years of age or older. The average household size was 2.54 and the average family size was 3.03.

In the township the population was spread out, with 20.9% under the age of 18, 7.2% from 18 to 24, 28.7% from 25 to 44, 25.3% from 45 to 64, and 17.9% who were 65 years of age or older. The median age was 41 years. For every 100 females, there were 97.4 males. For every 100 females age 18 and over, there were 92.0 males.

The median income for a household in the township was $41,339, and the median income for a family was $47,933. Males had a median income of $32,013 versus $22,077 for females. The per capita income for the township was $18,660. About 7.1% of families and 11.6% of the population were below the poverty line, including 16.0% of those under age 18 and 16.0% of those age 65 or over.

== Government ==
Pittston Township Board of Supervisors

Leadership
- Chairperson: David Slezak
- Vice Chairperson: Joseph Hawk
- Seats: 3

Meeting place
- Pittston Township Municipal Building

Website
- pittstontownship.org/boardscommissions/board-of-supervisors/

A second class township government consists of three supervisors, each with equal voting power. The three current supervisors are:

- Joseph Hawk
- Deborah Taroli
- David Slezak

=== List of recent Pittston Township Supervisors ===
Supervisor (1)	Term
John Paglianite	2008
Ron Marcellini	2008–2014
Barbara Attardo	2014–2020
Joseph Hawk	2020–present

Supervisor (2)	Term
Tony Attardo	2009
Barbara Attardo	2009–2010
Stephen Rinaldi	2010–2024
Deborah Taroli	2024–present

Supervisor (3)	Term
Joseph Adams	1996–2016
F. Sciabacucchi	2016–2018
David Slezak	2018–present

== Education ==
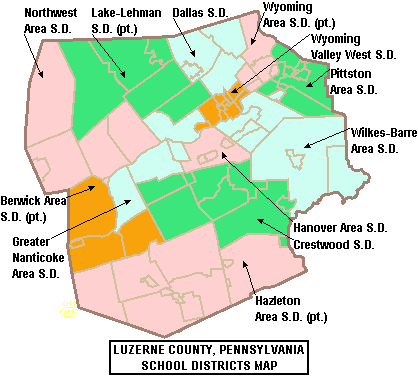
Pittston Area School District, highlighted in green, is located in the northeastern corner of Luzerne County

=== Public schools ===
Pittston Township is located within the Pittston Area School District, which also includes covers the city of Pittston, Dupont, Duryea, Hughestown, Yatesville, Avoca, and Jenkins Township.

The Pittston Area School District consists of four schools:

- Pittston Area Primary Center - Hughestown (Grades: K-1)
- Pittston Area Intermediate Center - Pittston (Grades: 2-4)
- Martin L. Mattei Middle School - Pittston (Grades: 5-8)
- Pittston Area Senior High School - Yatesville (Grades: 9-12)

=== Private schools ===
There were several Catholic schools in the Greater Pittston area; many have been closed by the Diocese of Scranton due to lack of funding and low enrollment. Holy Rosary is located in Duryea.

== Transportation ==
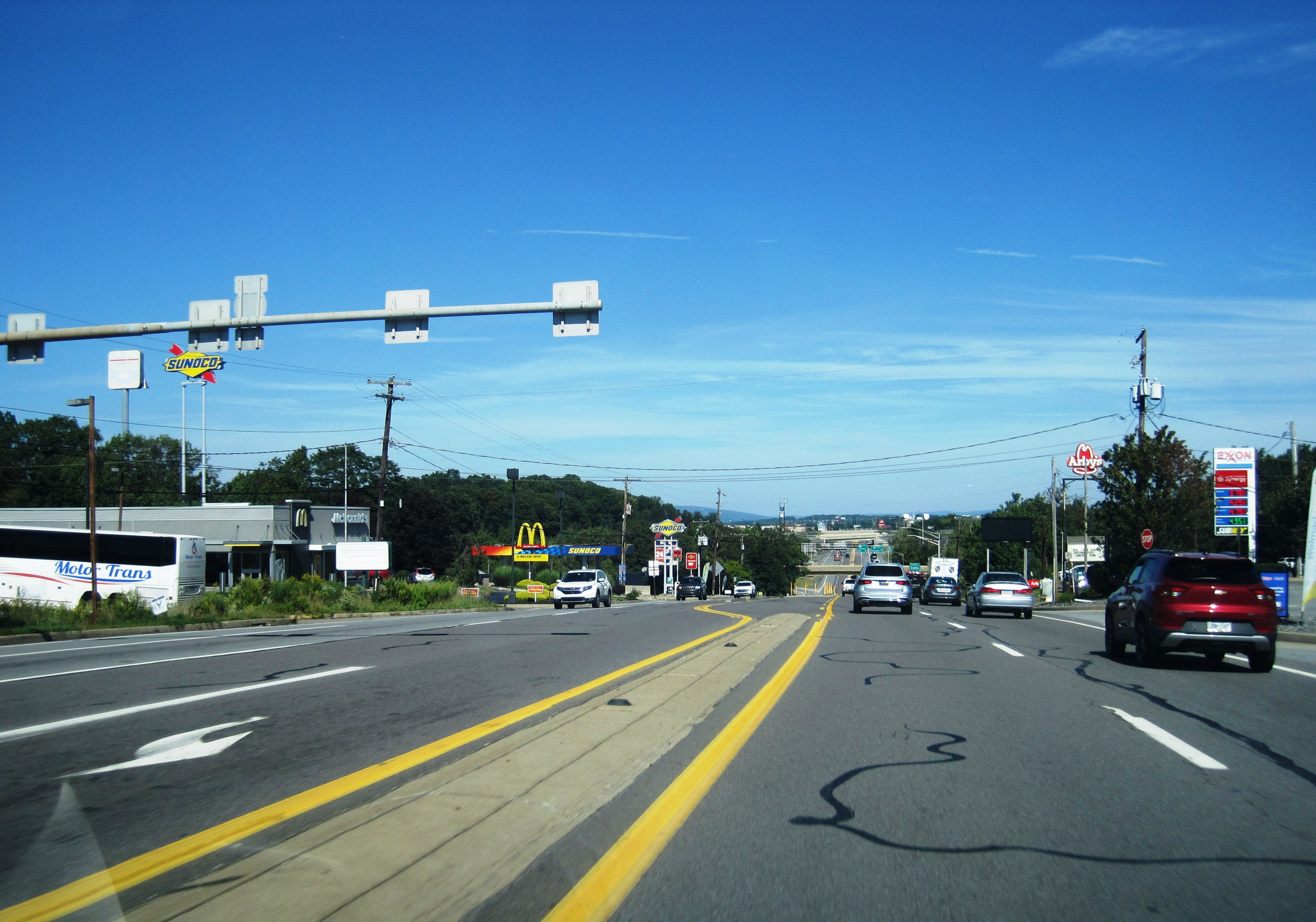
Pennsylvania Route 315 in Pittston Township

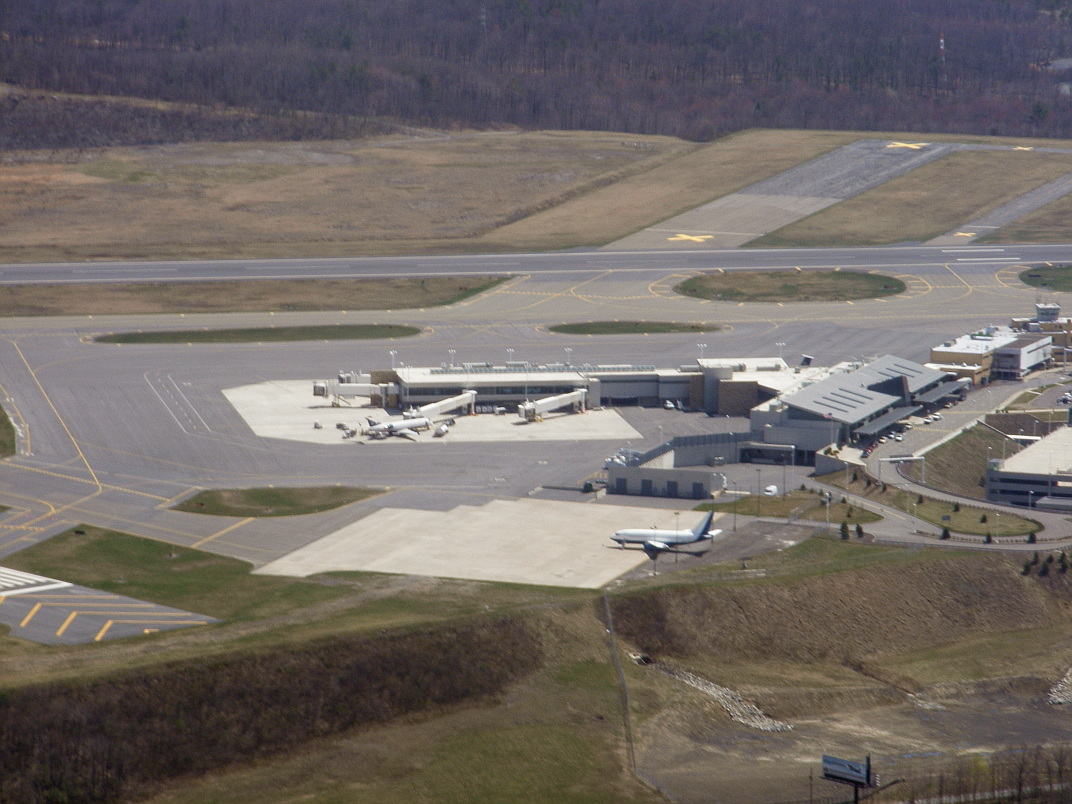
Wilkes-Barre/Scranton International Airport in Pittston Township

=== Highways ===
Interstate 81 passes through Pittston Township. The highway's major exits include Roanoke and Winchester, Virginia, Hagerstown, Maryland, Harrisburg, Wilkes-Barre, and Scranton, Pennsylvania, and Binghamton and Syracuse, New York. After passing through Watertown, New York, Interstate 81 crosses the St. Lawrence Seaway to meet Highway 401 in Canada. Pittston Township is also located near the Northeast Extension of the Pennsylvania Turnpike, Interstate 476, providing service from Clarks Summit to Philadelphia. U.S. Route 11, Pennsylvania Route 315, and Pennsylvania Route 502 also pass through the township.

=== Public transportation ===
Pittston Township is served by the Luzerne County Transportation Authority and COLTS, which provides bus service to the city and other communities within Luzerne County and Lackawanna County. Martz Trailways also provides commuter, tour, and trip service from Pittston, Wilkes-Barre and Scranton to points east and south, such as Philadelphia, New York City, and Atlantic City.

=== Air ===
Wilkes-Barre/Scranton International Airport is located in Pittston Township. The airport is served by eight international airlines and has hosted Air Force One on regional presidential visits several times in the past. In the spring of 2002, the airport began offering an increased number of non-stop flights across the nation. Service is provided by Continental Airlines, Delta, Northwest Airlines, United Airlines, and US Airways.

=== Rail ===
At present, the Reading Blue Mountain and Northern Railroad, Canadian Pacific Railway, successor to the Delaware and Hudson Railway, and the Luzerne and Susquehanna Railway, the designated operator of the county-owned shortline, provide freight service within Pittston City and Pittston Township. A proposed nearby commuter train from Scranton to New York City has received government funding.
