= Pittston Area High School =

Coordinates: 41.30305°N 75.79409°W

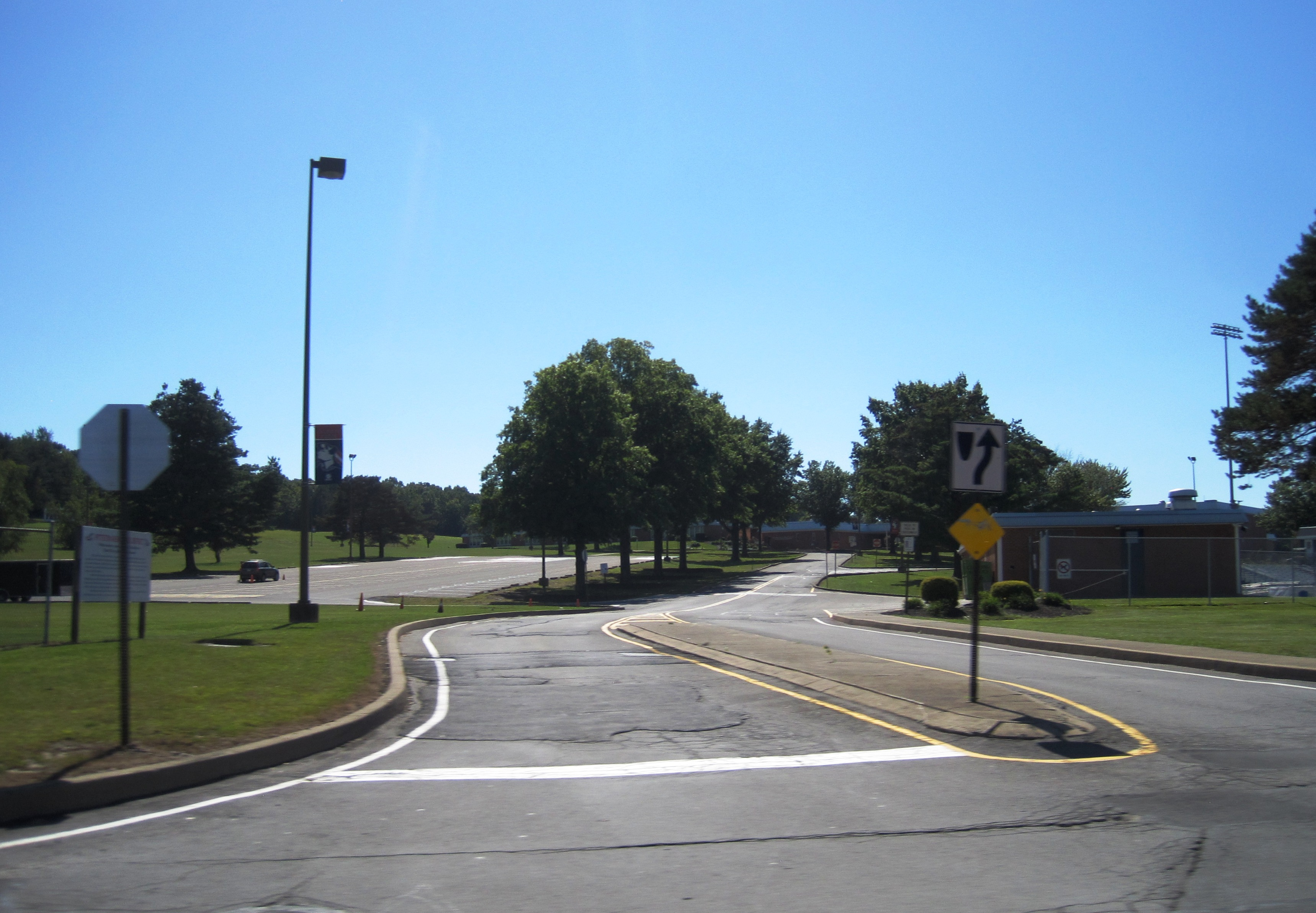
- Pittston Area High School from Stout Street
- 5 Stout Street; Pittston, Pennsylvania; United States

Information
- Type: Public
- School district: Pittston Area School District
- NCES School ID: 421920005058
- Teaching staff: 58.25 (on FTE basis)
- Grades: 9 to 12
- Enrollment: 1,076 (2023-2024)
- Student to teacher ratio: 18.47
- Color
- Mascot: GETZIE
- Website: Pittston Area High School

Pittston Area High School is a public high school located near Pittston, Pennsylvania. The building itself straddles the border of Jenkins Township and Yatesville. The school is part of the Pittston Area School District and it serves about 1,100 students in grades 9 to 12.
