= Pennsylvania Route 315 =

State highway in Luzerne County, Pennsylvania, US

Pennsylvania Route 315

Route information
- Maintained by PennDOT
- Length: 8.212 mi (13.216 km)
- Existed: 1928–present

Major junctions
- South end: PA 309 / PA 309 Bus. in Wilkes-Barre
- I-81 / I-476 / Penna Turnpike NE Extension in Pittston Township
- North end: I-81 / Navy Way Road / Terminal Road in Avoca

Location
- Country: United States
- State: Pennsylvania
- Counties: Luzerne

Highway system
- Pennsylvania State Route System; Interstate; US; State; Scenic; Legislative
← PA 314	→ PA 316

Pennsylvania Route 315 (PA 315) is an 8.2-mile-long (13.2 km) state highway located in Luzerne County, Pennsylvania. The southern terminus is at an interchange with the PA 309 freeway and the northern terminus of PA 309 Business (PA 309 Bus.) in Wilkes-Barre. The northern terminus is at the entrance of the Wilkes-Barre/Scranton International Airport in Pittston Township just past an interchange with Interstate 81 (I-81). PA 315 heads northeast from PA 309 and PA 309 Bus. as a multilane road through suburban development in the Wyoming Valley parallel to I-81. The route comes to an interchange with I-81 and I-476 (Pennsylvania Turnpike Northeast Extension) before passing through Dupont along a one-way pair. Past here, PA 315 follows a divided highway to I-81 and the airport.

PA 315 was first designated in 1928 between PA 115 in Wilkes-Barre and U.S. Route 11 (US 11, now unnumbered Main Street) in Pittston, following Main Street between the two cities. In the 1930s, the route was moved to a multilane highway running between PA 115 east of Wilkes-Barre and US 11 in Dupont. The route was extended north along a divided highway to US 11 in Moosic in the 1950s. The northern terminus of the route was moved to I-81 near the airport in 1966, with I-81 replacing the route north of there. In the 1970s, the route begun at US 11 in Larksville and traveled through Wilkes-Barre, but was reverted by the 1980s. In the 1980s, the north end was moved to US 11 in Dupont. The south end was changed from PA 115 to an interchange with the PA 309 freeway in 1991. By 2003, PA 315's northern terminus reverted to its current location.

== Route description ==
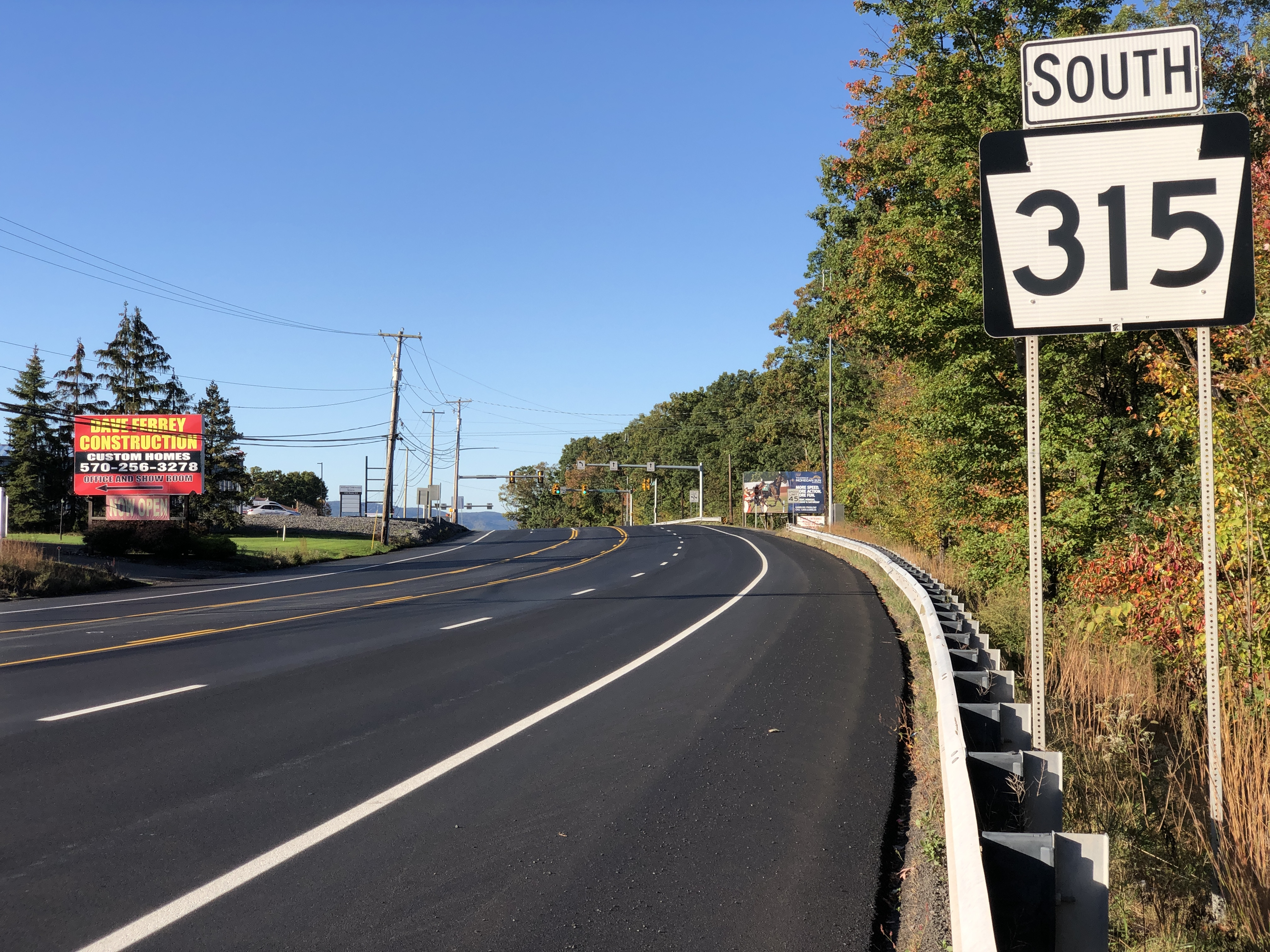
PA 315 southbound in Plains Township

PA 315 begins at an interchange with the PA 309 freeway on the border of the city of Wilkes-Barre and Plains Township, heading northeast on a four-lane divided highway. Southwest of PA 309, the road becomes PA 309 Bus. PA 315 becomes a five-lane road with a center left-turn lane as it passes businesses in Plains Township, running to the northwest of the WOLF-TV studios. The road runs a short distance to the west of I-81 and passes east of the Mohegan Pennsylvania hotel, casino, and harness racetrack. From this point, the route heads into a mix of woods and commercial development, turning into a three-lane road with one northbound lane and two southbound lanes, running immediately to the west of I-81. Farther northeast, PA 315 becomes a four-lane road and enters more forested areas, briefly crossing into Jenkins Township before entering the borough of Laflin. The road passes scattered areas of businesses in this area with one northbound lane and two southbound lanes before passing over the Reading Blue Mountain and Northern Railroad's Lehigh Division line and crossing back into Jenkins Township. At this point, PA 315 becomes four lanes again and passes through woodland. The road becomes a divided highway again as it comes to an interchange with partial interchange with I-81 that has access to and from the southbound direction of that road.

The route crosses to the east side of I-81 and continues into Pittston Township, where it heads east of a park and ride lot and passes businesses as it reaches a trumpet interchange that connects to the Pennsylvania Turnpike Northeast Extension (I-476). A short distance later, PA 315 comes to another interchange with I-81 that has access to and from the northbound direction of the interstate. After this interchange, the route splits into a one-way pair and enters the borough of Dupont, with northbound PA 315 following Chestnut Street and southbound PA 315 following Ziegler Street. In this area, the road passes a mix of homes and businesses. In the center of Dupont, southbound PA 315 becomes Main Street, with the two directions of the route joining farther to the north. At this point, the route becomes four-lane undivided Airport Road and enters woodland, passing under Lidy Road before crossing into the borough of Avoca and turning to the northeast, becoming a divided highway. PA 315 reaches its northern terminus at the entrance of the Wilkes-Barre/Scranton International Airport, just past a final interchange with I-81 on the border of Avoca and Pittston Township. The I-81 interchange includes two roundabouts along PA 315.

== History ==
When Pennsylvania first legislated routes in 1911, what is now PA 315 was not given a number. PA 315 was designated in 1928 to run from PA 115 at Main Street and Courtright Avenue in Wilkes-Barre northeast to US 11 at Main Street and Plank Street in Pittston, running along Main Street between Wilkes-Barre and Pittston. At this time, the northern half of the route was paved. By 1930, the intersecting route at the northern terminus became US 309.

PA 315 was realigned in the 1930s to run from PA 115 east of Wilkes-Barre northeast to US 11 in Dupont along a multilane road further to the east. In the 1950s, the route was extended north along a divided highway from Dupont to end at US 11 in Moosic. The northern terminus of PA 315 was moved to an interchange with I-81 near the Wilkes-Barre/Scranton Airport in 1966, with the former route north of there incorporated into I-81. In the 1970s, the route's south end was extended to US 11 in Larksville, following West End Road, Carey Avenue, Horton Street, Main Street, Blackman Street, Wilkes-Barre Township Boulevard, Spring Street, Scott Street, and a concurrency with PA 115 on Kidder Street until its current south end. PA 315 replaced the PA 309 designation along Wilkes-Barre Township Boulevard, Spring Street, and Scott Street, with PA 309 realigned through the Wilkes-Barre area. The southern terminus was reverted to PA 115 by 1989, with PA 309 (now PA 309 Bus.) replacing PA 315 along Wilkes-Barre Township Boulevard, Spring Street, and Scott Street. The north end of the route was shifted via Main Street to end at US 11 in Dupont in the 1980s.

The southern terminus was modified from an intersection with PA 115 to an interchange with the newly constructed PA 309 freeway in 1991. By 2003, the northern end of PA 315 was shifted back to I-81 near the Wilkes-Barre/Scranton International Airport, replacing SR 2059.

== Major intersections ==
The entire route is in Luzerne County.

Location	mi	km	Destinations	Notes
Wilkes-Barre	0.000	0.000	PA 309 Bus. south (Kidder Street)	Continuation south
Wilkes-Barre	0.000	0.000	PA 309 to I-81 / PA 115 south – Forty Fort, Dallas	Exit 1 on PA 309
Jenkins Township	5.114– 5.142	8.230– 8.275	I-81 south – Hazleton	Southbound exit and northbound entrance; exit 175 on I-81
Pittston Township	5.639– 5.955	9.075– 9.584	I-81 north / I-476 Toll / Penna Turnpike NE Extension – Clarks Summit, Allentown, Scranton	Exit 175 on I-81; exit 115 (Wyoming Valley) on I-476 / Penna Turnpike NE Extension
Avoca	7.921– 7.948	12.748– 12.791	I-81 – Scranton, Wilkes-Barre	Exit 178 on I-81
Pittston Township	8.212	13.216	Navy Way Road / Terminal Road – Airport	East Airport Roundabout; northern terminus
1.000 mi = 1.609 km; 1.000 km = 0.621 mi: Incomplete access
