= Mud Run disaster =

1888 railroad accident in Pennsylvania

Coordinates: 40°59′23″N 75°42′47″W

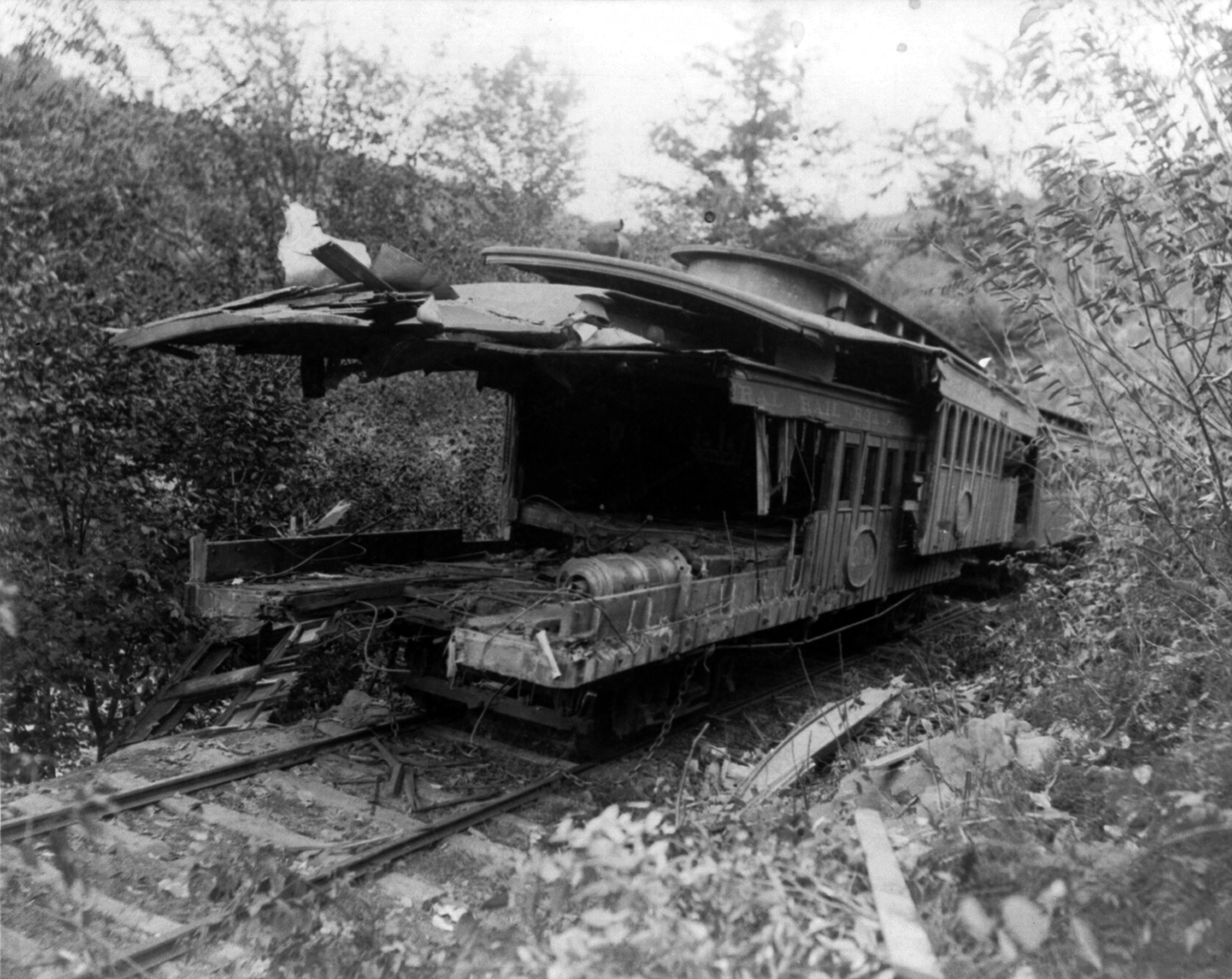
- Telescoping of cars

Details
- Date: October 10, 1888; 138 years ago 8:02 p.m.
- Location: Kidder Township, Carbon County, near Jim Thorpe, Pennsylvania
- Country: United States
- Line: Lehigh Valley Railroad
- Incident type: Rear collision
- Cause: Signal passed at danger

Statistics
- Trains: 2
- Deaths: 64
- Injured: 50

The Mud Run disaster was a train wreck that occurred on October 10, 1888, at Mud Run station in Kidder Township, Carbon County, Pennsylvania, about 7 miles from Jim Thorpe, Pennsylvania, on the Lehigh Valley Railroad. At 8:02 p.m., one train ran into the back of another, killing 64 people.

== Trains ==
The trains were taking home members of the Catholic Total Abstinence Union of America from a 20,000-person rally in Hazleton, Pennsylvania. Combined, 10,000 were returning to Luzerne and Lackawanna counties via the railroad. To accommodate this many passengers, eight trains were provided ("laid on"), running at ten-minute intervals. Each train had between 8 and 12 cars and was headed by two engines to cope with the steep grades between Penn Haven and Hazle Creek Junctions through what is now the Lehigh Gorge State Park. Lookouts, including the brakemen and firemen, were posted on each of the engines to watch ahead for signals.

The first five trains passed through the Mud Run station area without incident. As the sixth train passed through, it stopped 600 or 700 feet (180 or 210 meters) beyond the station as there was no 'All Clear' signal displayed ahead. There was a red light on the rear car of this train, indicating its presence and serving as a stop signal for any approaching train. The station was on a curve making it difficult to see the idled train. The flagman, James Hannigan, of the idled train walked back along the track to warn the seventh train, which was then approaching Mud Run. During an inquest conducted by Coroner A. J. Horn of Carbon County on the morning after the accident, Hannigan stated that he had gone 400 feet (120 m) from the rear of the idled train and that "he did not know about a rule requiring that he go back a distance of sixteen telegraph poles as required by LVRR regulations." That distance was lengthened to 1,900 feet (580 m) at his trial.

The seventh train, headed westbound, had passed an eastbound train, which would normally indicate that the single track area of the line ahead was now clear. The lookouts on the seventh train, Hugh Mulhearn and Joseph Pohl, failed to see the red signal at Mud Run station and by the time they noticed the light being waved frantically by the flagman of the sixth train, it was too late to avoid a collision.

== Collision ==
The full length of the lead engine telescoped into the rear car (car 210) and drove it two thirds of its length into the next car (car 204). Only two excursionists, John Curran of Pleasant Valley and James Jennings of Minooka, survived in the rear car 'on all sides hung mangled bodies and limbs' whilst the second was described as 'crowded with maimed and bleeding bodies'. An attempt was made to withdraw the engine from the third car but brought 'such awful cries of distress that it was abandoned'.

In all, 64 were killed and scores injured; 32 of the dead were from the small village of Pleasant Valley (recently renamed Avoca) or Moosic and attended St. Mary's Roman Catholic Church, many were teenage members of the Drum and Bugle Corps of the St. Aloysius Society.

== Charges ==
On Section 6, the idled and telescoped section, Conductor Charles Terry and Brakeman and Lookout James Hannigan were found guilty of gross negligence by the Coroner of Carbon County and his six jurymen. On Section 7, the leading engine, Conductor Joseph Keithline of Wilkes-Barre, Engineer Henry Cook of Wilkes Barre, Fireman and Lookout Hugh Gallagher, and Brakeman and Lookout Joseph Pohl were also found guilty of gross negligence. On Section 7, the second engine that controlled the brakes, Engineer Thomas Major of Mauch Chunk and Brakeman James Mulhearn were found guilty of gross negligence.

One of the lookouts even admitted to having seen a red light but 'did not think the red light meant anything, as nobody used it'. In January 1889, the cases against Conductors Terry and Keithline and lookouts Mulhearn and Pohl were ignored. Cook and Hannigan were tried together and were acquitted. Major, who was tried separately, was also acquitted.

== List of those killed ==
List of those killed:

- John Rogan - Jessup
- James Flynn - Miners' Mills
- Anthony Mulligan - Olyphant

From Minooka (now a part of Scranton):

- James Conaboy
- William Cusick
- Festus Mulherin/Mulkerin
- James Mullen
- Patrick Powell
- Richard Powell
- Rose Powell
- Thomas Toole

From Pleasant Valley (Avoca):

- John Barrett
- Martin Barrett
- James Brehony
- Bridgit Brehony
- John M. Coleman
- John Coleman
- Michael Coleman
- Patrick Curran
- Abram Doran
- Lewis Doran
- William Earley
- Kate Featherstone
- Matthew Flaherty
- Austin Gibbons
- James Jackson (son of Frank)
- James Jackson (son of Henry)
- Patrick Keenan
- William Kelly
- John J. McAndrew
- Margaret McAndrew
- Thomas F. McAndrew
- Bernard Meehan
- Mary (Polly Meehan)
- Benjamin O'Brien
- Thomas Ruddy
- John Walsh
- Patrick Walsh
- Michael Whelan Jr.

From Moosic:

- James Lynott
- John Lynott
- Thomas Morrissey
- Charles Goelitz

From Scranton:

- John Ahearn
- Michael Dolan
- William Duhigg
- James Farry
- James Gallagher
- John J. Gibson (or Gibbons)
- James Hart
- Maggie Hart
- Martin Hart
- James Keating
- Katie Kennedy
- Owen Kilcullen
- Peter Kline
- Michael Maxwell
- Edward O'Malley
- Katie McNichols
- Michael Moffit
- Thomas Moran
- William Noon
- Patrick Smith
- George Henry Stevens
