= Rudolph Belarski =

American graphic artist

- Born: May 27, 1900; Dupont, Pennsylvania, U.S.
- Died: December 24, 1983 (aged 83); Westport, Connecticut, U.S.
- Education: International Correspondence School; Pratt Institute
- Employers: International Correspondence School; Pratt Institute; Famous Artists School
- Known for: Illustrating, pulp magazine covers, graphic art, painting, art school instructor

Rudolph Belarski (May 27, 1900 – December 24, 1983) was an American graphic artist known for his cover art depicting aerial combat for magazines such as Wings, Dare-Devil Aces, and War Birds. He also drew science fiction covers for Argosy in the 1930s and covers for mystery and detective novels.

== Early life ==
Belarski was born on May 27, 1900, in Dupont, Pennsylvania, a mining town, to immigrant parents from Galicia. At the age of 12, he was legally allowed to quit school to work in the coal mines where he spent ten years of his life. During that time he took mail-order art classes at night from International Correspondence School. In 1922, he moved to New York City and studied at the Pratt Institute in Brooklyn from which he graduated in 1926. From 1928 to 1933, Belarski taught at Pratt Institute.

== Career ==
=== Early career ===
Upon ending his five years teaching at Pratt Institute, he first began working at Dell Publishing doing covers and interiors of the adventure pulps. The subject matter was about World War I or "The Great War." Some of the titles included War Aces, War Birds, T. X. O'Leary's War Birds, War Novels, and War Stories.

Ending his two-year tenure at Dell Publishing; Belarski started painting pulp covers at Thrilling Publications/Standard Publications in 1935 and became one Ned Pines' top artists. Some of the titles included Air War, American Eagle, Black Book Detective, Detective Novels, G-Men Detective, Lone Eagle, Mystery Book, The Phantom Detective, Popular Detective, Sky Fighters, Startling Stories, Thrilling Adventures, Thrilling Detective, Thrilling Mystery, and Thrilling Wonder.

Also during this time, he would paint pulp covers for Munsey which included All-American Fiction, Argosy, Big Chief, Cavalier Classics, Detective Fiction Weekly, Double Detective, and Red Star Adventures. He also worked for Fiction House working on pulp covers which included Aces, Air Stories, Lariat Stories, and Wings.

=== World War II and post war ===
During World War II, Belarski was considered too old for service, but joined the USO in which he drew portraits for hospitalized servicemen in New York and London. Following the war, he would become the cover top cover artists for Ned Pines and Popular Library until 1951 while working for various men's magazines until 1960 which included Adventure, Argosy, For Men Only, Man's Conquest, Man's Illustrated, Man's World, Men, Outdoor Life, Stag, and True Adventure.

=== Late career and death ===
In 1954, Belarski moved to Westport, Connecticut and become a correspondence art instructor for Famous Artists School. He remained an instructor until his retirement in 1972. On Christmas Eve 1983; he died of complications due to colitis.
