= Hughestown, Pennsylvania =

Borough in Pennsylvania, US

- Borough
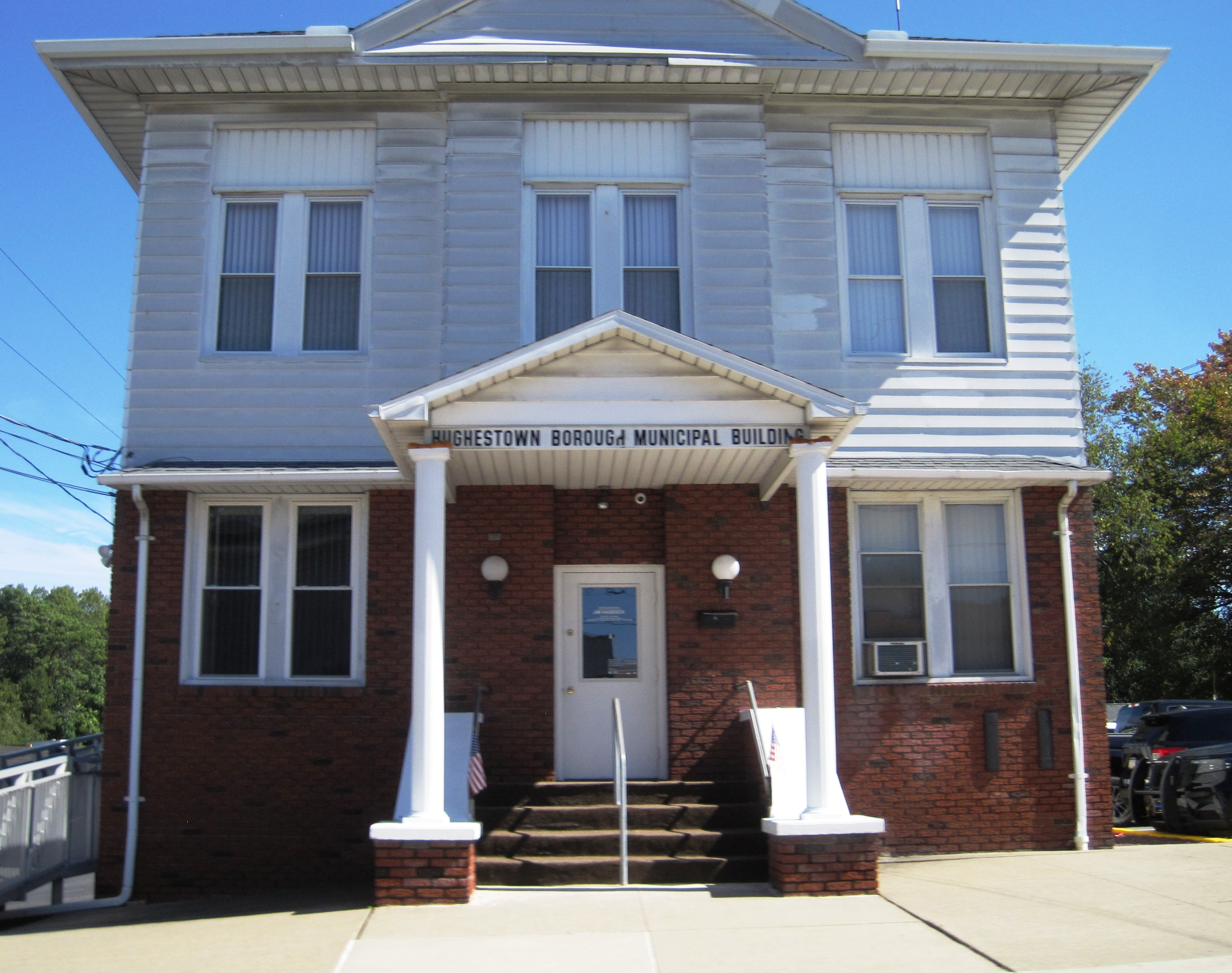
- Hughestown Borough Municipal Building

- Location of Hughestown in Luzerne County, Pennsylvania.

- Location within Pennsylvania Location within the United States
- Coordinates: 41°19′38″N 75°46′31″W
- Country: United States
- State: Pennsylvania
- County: Luzerne
- Region: Greater Pittston
- Settled: 1836
- Incorporated: 1879

Government
  - Type: Borough Council
  - Mayor: Lynda Hoban

Area
  - Total: 0.87 sq mi (2.25 km^{2})
  - Land: 0.87 sq mi (2.25 km^{2})
  - Water: 0 sq mi (0.00 km^{2})

Population (2020)
  - Total: 1,329
  - Density: 1,527.6/sq mi (589.82/km^{2})
- Time zone: UTC-5 (Eastern (EST))
  - Summer (DST): UTC-4 (EDT)
- Area code: 570
- FIPS code: 42-36152

Hughestown is a borough in the Greater Pittston area of Luzerne County, Pennsylvania, United States. The population was 1,326 at the 2020 census.

== History ==
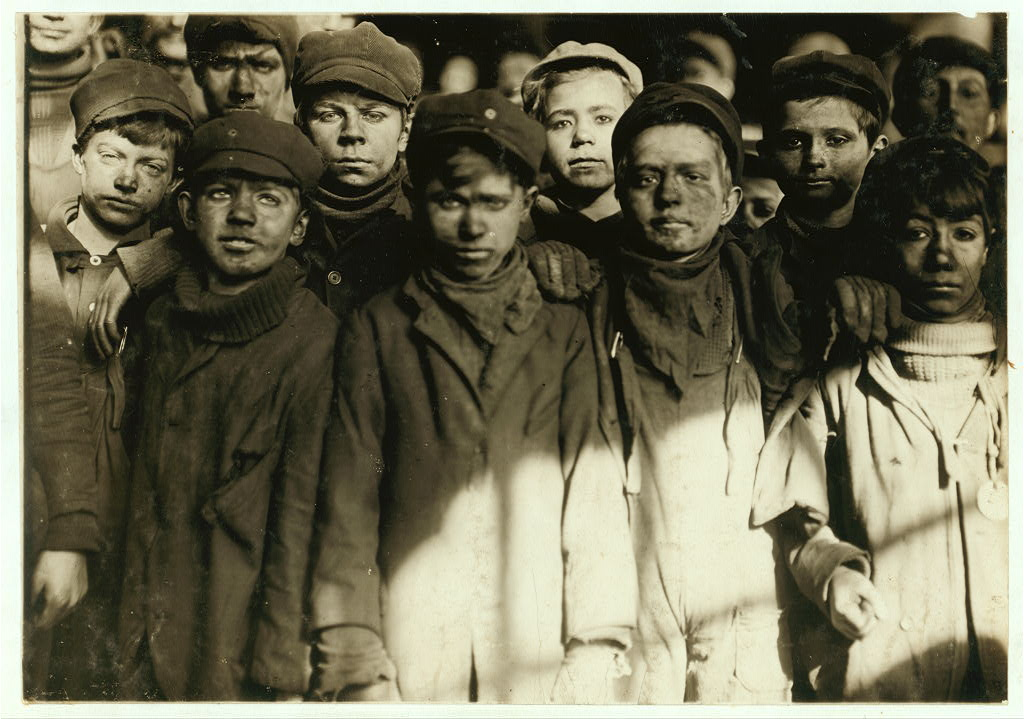
Hughestown Breaker Boys, photo by Lewis Hine

The area was originally a small settlement within Pittston Township. However, as the regional population swelled due to industrial growth, the community sought independence. On April 7, 1879, Hughestown was officially incorporated as a borough.

Anthracite coal mining was a major industry in the region. During the late 19th and early 20th centuries, Hughestown was a bustling hub centered around the massive Number 9 Breaker, operated by the Pennsylvania Coal Company. This industrial giant processed the raw coal extracted from local mines, which was then shipped across the country via the nearby railroads. The economy was further supported by a prominent local brick factory and various mercantile stores that served the growing population of European immigrants.

However, this industrial prosperity came with a high human cost. Hughestown became a focal point for social reform when photographer Lewis Hine visited the borough in 1911. Hine’s powerful images of the town’s "breaker boys"—young children working in dangerous conditions to sort slate from coal—became national symbols of the struggle for workers' rights. These photographs were instrumental in the eventual passage of federal child labor laws, securing Hughestown’s place in American social history.

As the coal industry declined around the time of the Knox Mine Disaster (in the mid-20th century), Hughestown transitioned into a quiet, residential borough. The towering breakers were eventually dismantled, and the former mining sites were reclaimed for modern housing developments.

== Geography ==
According to the United States Census Bureau, the borough has a total area of 0.93 square miles (2.4 km^{2}), all land. U.S. Route 11 runs through the southern portion of the borough. Hughestown is served by the Pittston Area School District. Robert Yaple Memorial Park is located in central Hughestown. Most of the homes and businesses are located in the western portion of the borough, while the eastern section consists of mostly forests and culm banks.

== Demographics ==
Historical population
Census	Pop.	Note	%±
1880	1,192		—
1890	1,454		22.0%
1900	1,548		6.5%
1910	2,024		30.7%
1920	2,244		10.9%
1930	2,252		0.4%
1940	2,340		3.9%
1950	1,888		−19.3%
1960	1,615		−14.5%
1970	1,407		−12.9%
1980	1,783		26.7%
1990	1,734		−2.7%
2000	1,541		−11.1%
2010	1,392		−9.7%
2020	1,329		−4.5%
2021 (est.)	1,329	Steady	0.0%

At the 2000 census there were 1,541 people, 615 households, and 444 families living in the borough. The population density was 1,734.6 inhabitants per square mile (669.7/km^{2}). There were 659 housing units at an average density of 741.8 per square mile (286.4/km^{2}). The racial makeup of the borough was 99.35% White, 0.13% African American, 0.06% Pacific Islander, 0.13% from other races, and 0.32% from two or more races. Hispanic or Latino of any race were 0.13%.

There were 615 households, 25.2% had children under the age of 18 living with them, 57.6% were married couples living together, 10.4% had a female householder with no husband present, and 27.8% were non-families. 24.6% of households were made up of individuals, and 13.8% were one person aged 65 or older. The average household size was 2.50 and the average family size was 2.98.

The age distribution was 19.1% under the age of 18, 7.1% from 18 to 24, 27.1% from 25 to 44, 28.5% from 45 to 64, and 18.2% 65 or older. The median age was 43 years. For every 100 females there were 97.3 males. For every 100 females age 18 and over, there were 88.2 males.

The median household income was $41,750 and the median family income was $50,938. Males had a median income of $33,611 versus $22,422 for females. The per capita income for the borough was $20,246. About 4.7% of families and 5.7% of the population were below the poverty line, including 4.2% of those under age 18 and 7.1% of those age 65 or over.

== Government ==
Lynda Hoban was sworn-in as the borough's first female mayor in 2026.

== Education ==
It is in the Pittston Area School District.
