= Dupont, Pennsylvania =

Borough in Pennsylvania, US

- Borough
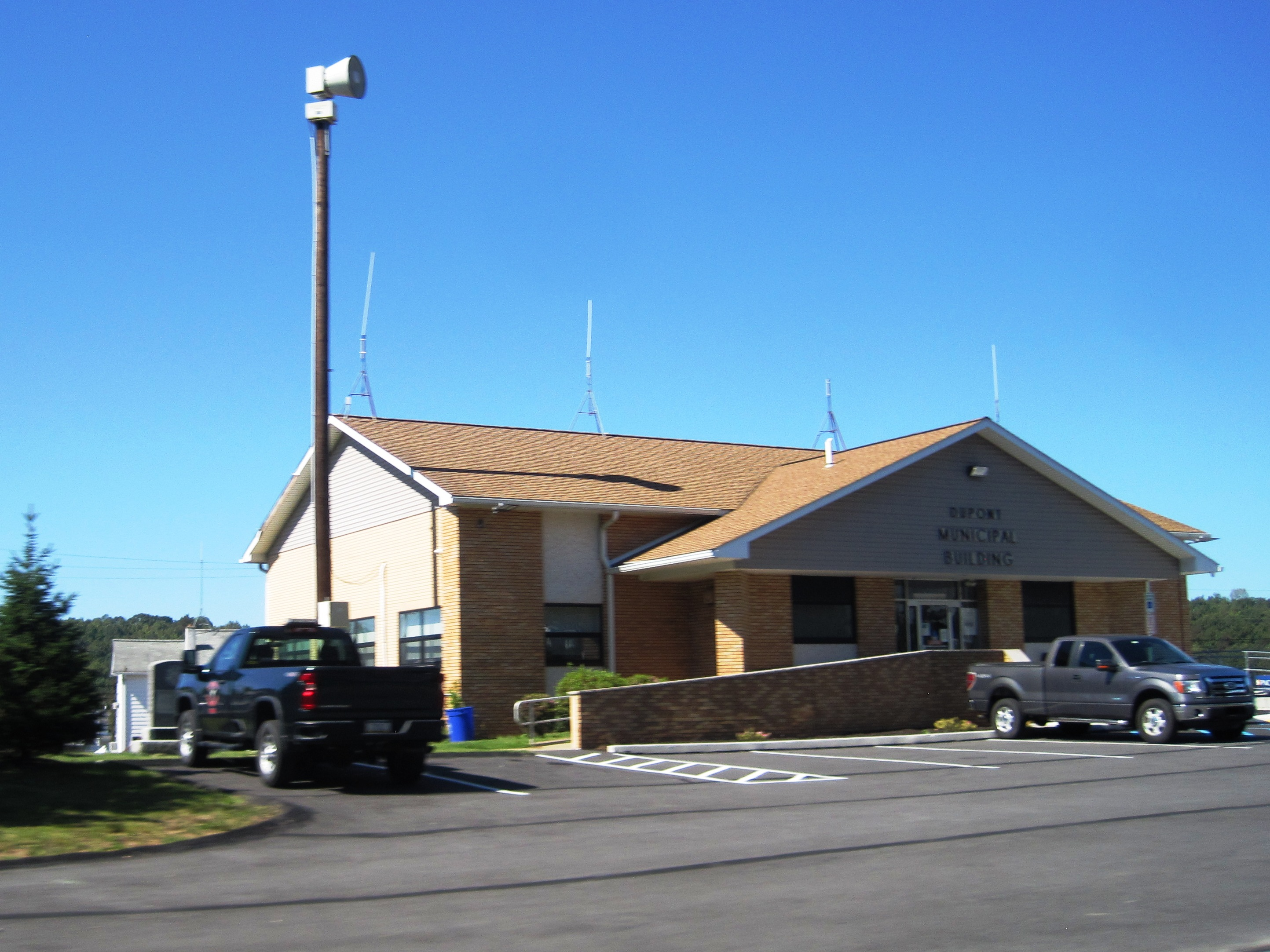
- Dupont Municipal Building

- Location of Dupont in Luzerne County, Pennsylvania.

- Location within Pennsylvania Location within the United States
- Coordinates: 41°19′18″N 75°44′47″W
- Country: United States
- State: Pennsylvania
- County: Luzerne
- Region: Greater Pittston
- Incorporated: 1917

Government
  - Type: Borough Council
  - Mayor: Daniel Lello (D)

Area
  - Total: 1.56 sq mi (4.05 km^{2})
  - Land: 1.56 sq mi (4.05 km^{2})
  - Water: 0 sq mi (0.00 km^{2})
- Elevation: 720 ft (220 m)

Population (2020)
  - Total: 2,539
  - Density: 1,623.1/sq mi (626.68/km^{2})
- Time zone: UTC-5 (Eastern (EST))
  - Summer (DST): UTC-4 (EDT)
- Zip code: 18641
- Area code: 570
- FIPS code: 42-20424
- Website: dupontpa.gov

Dupont is a borough in the Greater Pittston area of Luzerne County, Pennsylvania, United States. The population was 2,536 as of the 2020 census.

== History ==
The community was incorporated as a borough in 1917; it was originally called "Smithville," in honor of its first group of settlers. The community was later renamed Dupont after Dupont Explosives, a company which made explosives for mining. These explosives were used throughout Northeastern Pennsylvania in the 19th and 20th centuries. Dupont Explosives eventually closed after the advancement of technology in gathering coal.

== Geography ==
Dupont is located at 41°19′18″N 75°44′47″W (41.321680, -75.746285).

According to the United States Census Bureau, the borough has a total area of 1.5 square miles (3.9 km^{2}), all land.

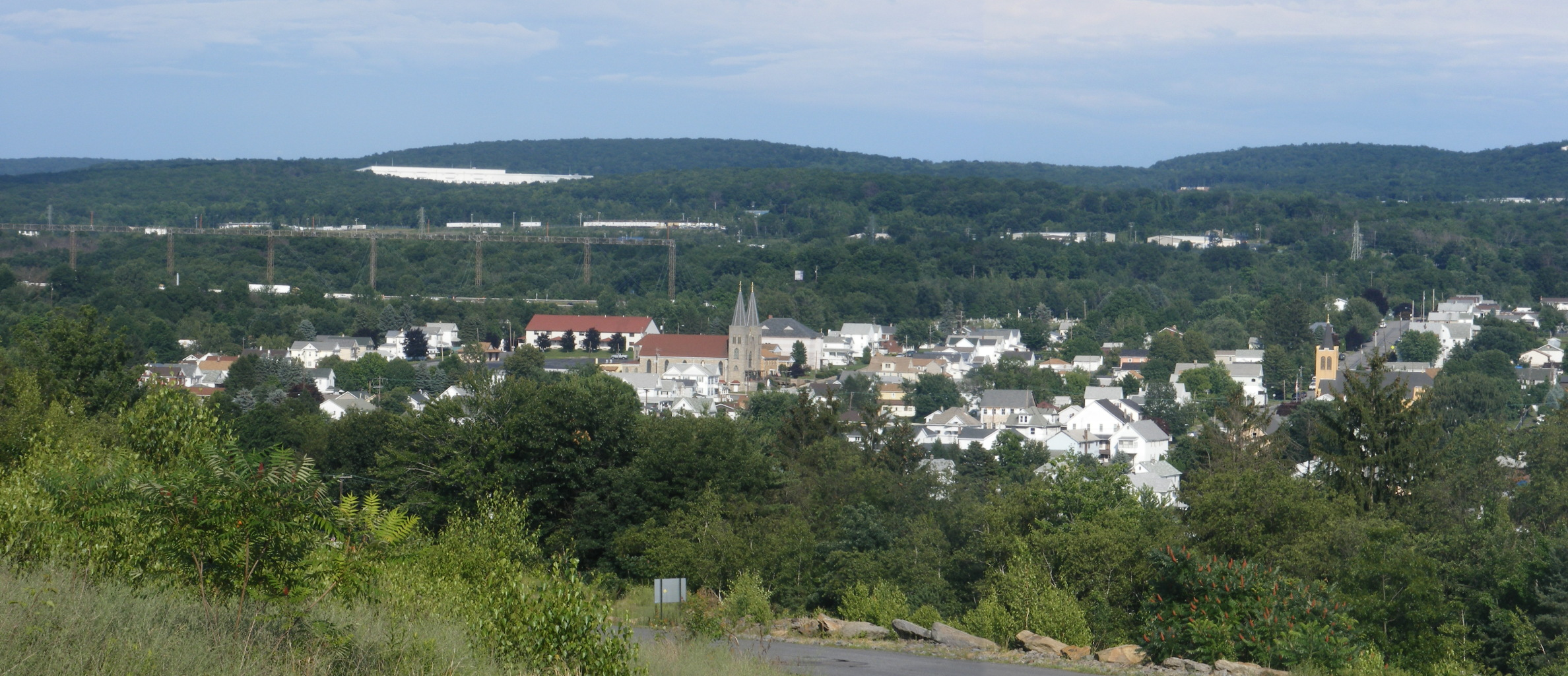

=== Transportation ===
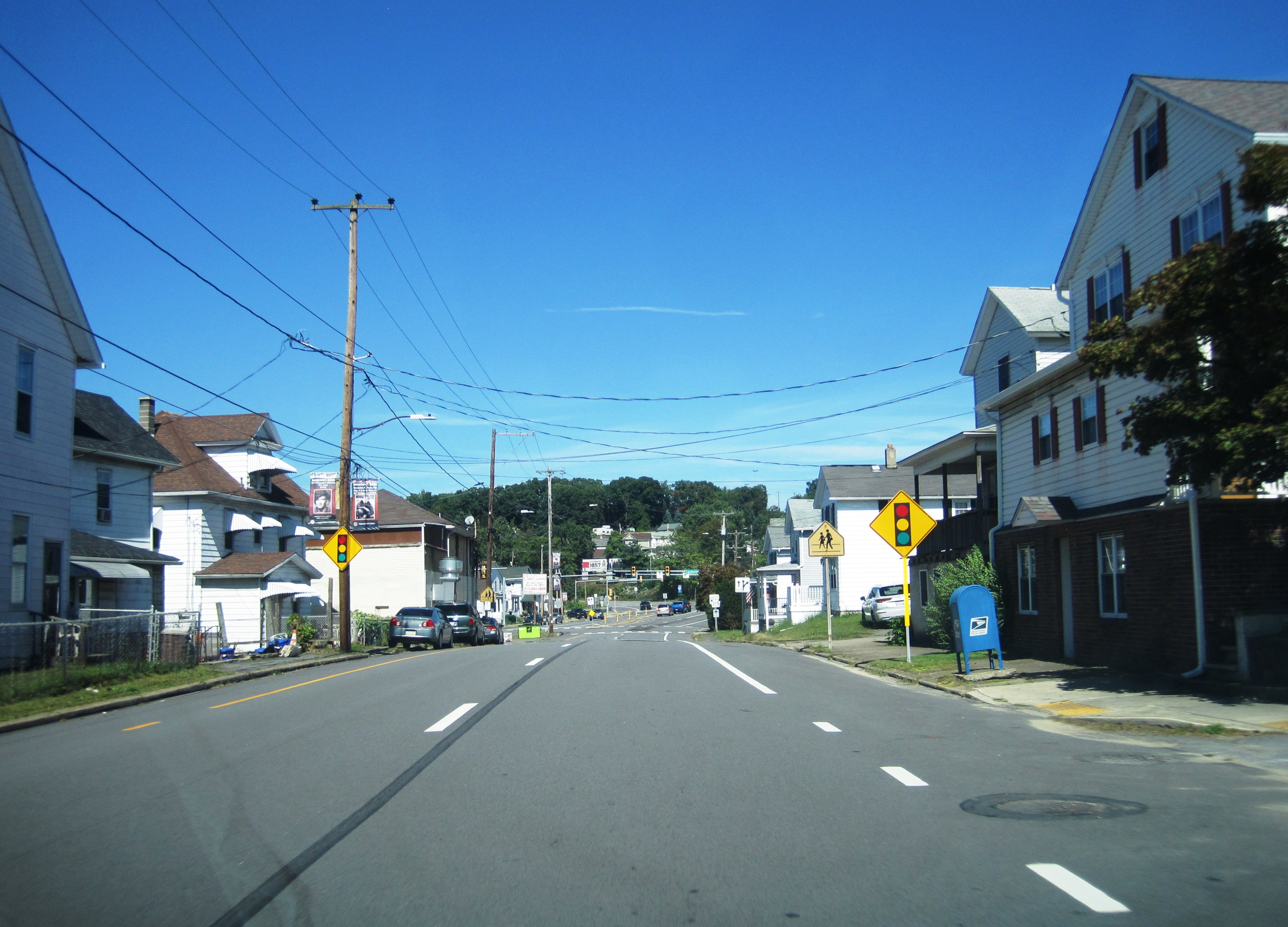
PA 315 northbound (Chestnut Street) through Dupont

Major highways
I-81
I-476 / Penna Turnpike NE Extension
US 11
PA 315

== Demographics ==
Historical population
Census	Pop.	Note	%±
1920	4,576		—
1930	5,161		12.8%
1940	5,278		2.3%
1950	4,107		−22.2%
1960	3,669		−10.7%
1970	3,431		−6.5%
1980	3,460		0.8%
1990	2,984		−13.8%
2000	2,719		−8.9%
2010	2,711		−0.3%
2020	2,539		−6.3%
2021 (est.)	2,541	▲	0.1%

As of the census of 2000, there were 2,719 people, 1,228 households, and 789 families living in the borough. The population density was 1,790.9 inhabitants per square mile (691.5/km^{2}). There were 1,354 housing units at an average density of 891.8 per square mile (344.3/km^{2}). The racial makeup of the borough was 99.23% White, 0.44% African American, 0.07% Asian, and 0.26% from two or more races. Hispanic or Latino of any race were 0.11% of the population.

There were 1,228 households, 18.9% had children under the age of 18 living with them, 46.7% were married couples living together, 13.4% had a female householder with no husband present, and 35.7% were non-families. 32.6% of households were made up of individuals, and 17.8% were one person aged 65 or older. The average household size was 2.21 and the average family size was 2.79.

The age distribution was 15.9% under the age of 18, 6.3% from 18 to 24, 26.9% from 25 to 44, 24.5% from 45 to 64, and 26.4% 65 or older. The median age was 46 years. For every 100 females there were 88.8 males. For every 100 females age 18 and over, there were 84.3 males.

The median household income was $32,317 and the median family income was $39,250. Males had a median income of $28,431 versus $26,250 for females. The per capita income for the borough was $17,042. About 4.0% of families and 6.2% of the population were below the poverty line, including 10.3% of those under age 18 and 7.8% of those age 65 or over.

== Education ==
It is in the Pittston Area School District.

== Notable people ==
- Rudolph Belarski, graphic artist and teacher
- Edwin Michael Kosik, United States District Judge
- Brandon Matthews, Professional Golfer
