= Pittston Area School District =

School district in Pennsylvania

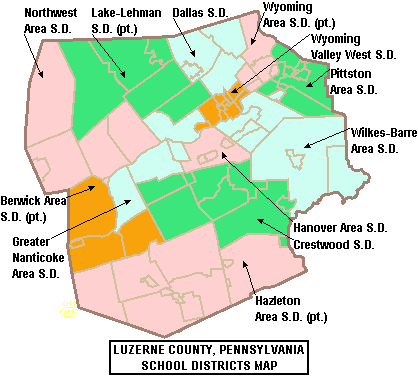
- Map of Luzerne County, Pennsylvania school districts, with the Pittston Area School District in green in the north-eastern part of the county

Address
- GETZIE Pittston, Pennsylvania, 18640; United States
- Coordinates: 41.3261°N 75.7361°W

District information
- Type: Public
- Established: 1966

Other information
- Website: https://www.pittstonarea.com/

Pittston Area Senior High School

Location
- 5 Stout Street; Yatesville, (Luzerne County), Pennsylvania 18640; United States

Information
- Type: Public high school
- Principal: Chris Lazevnick
- Staff: 58.25 (FTE)
- Enrollment: 1,076 (2023-24)
- Student to teacher ratio: 18.47
- Colors: Red, blue and white
- Nickname: Patriots
- Website: Pittston Area Senior High School

Pittston Area School District (PASD) is a mid-sized school district located in the Greater Pittston area of Luzerne County, Pennsylvania, the north-eastern part of the state, in the United States. The school district serves students from the city of Pittston, the boroughs of Avoca, Dupont, Duryea, Hughestown, Yatesville, Jenkins, and Pittston townships. Pittston Area School District encompasses approximately 42 square miles. According to 2000 federal census data, it serves a resident population of 30,034. In 2019, the residents' per capita income was $16,811 and the median family income was $40,063. Per school district officials, in school year 2005–06, the PASD provided basic educational services to 3,147 pupils through the employment of 196 teachers, 159 full-time and part-time support personnel, and 10 administrators.

PASD was created in 1966 by merging Pittston School District, Pittston Township School District, Hughestown School District, Dupont School District, Duryea School District, and Avoca School District. The first superintendent was Martin Mattei. PASD currently runs four schools: Pittston Area High School in Yatesville (grades 9 through 12), Martin L. Mattei Middle School in Pittston (grades 6 through 8), Pittston Area Intermediate Center in Pittston (grades 3 through 5), and Pittston Area Primary School in Hughestown (grades K through 2).

== Saint John the Baptist Elementary School ==
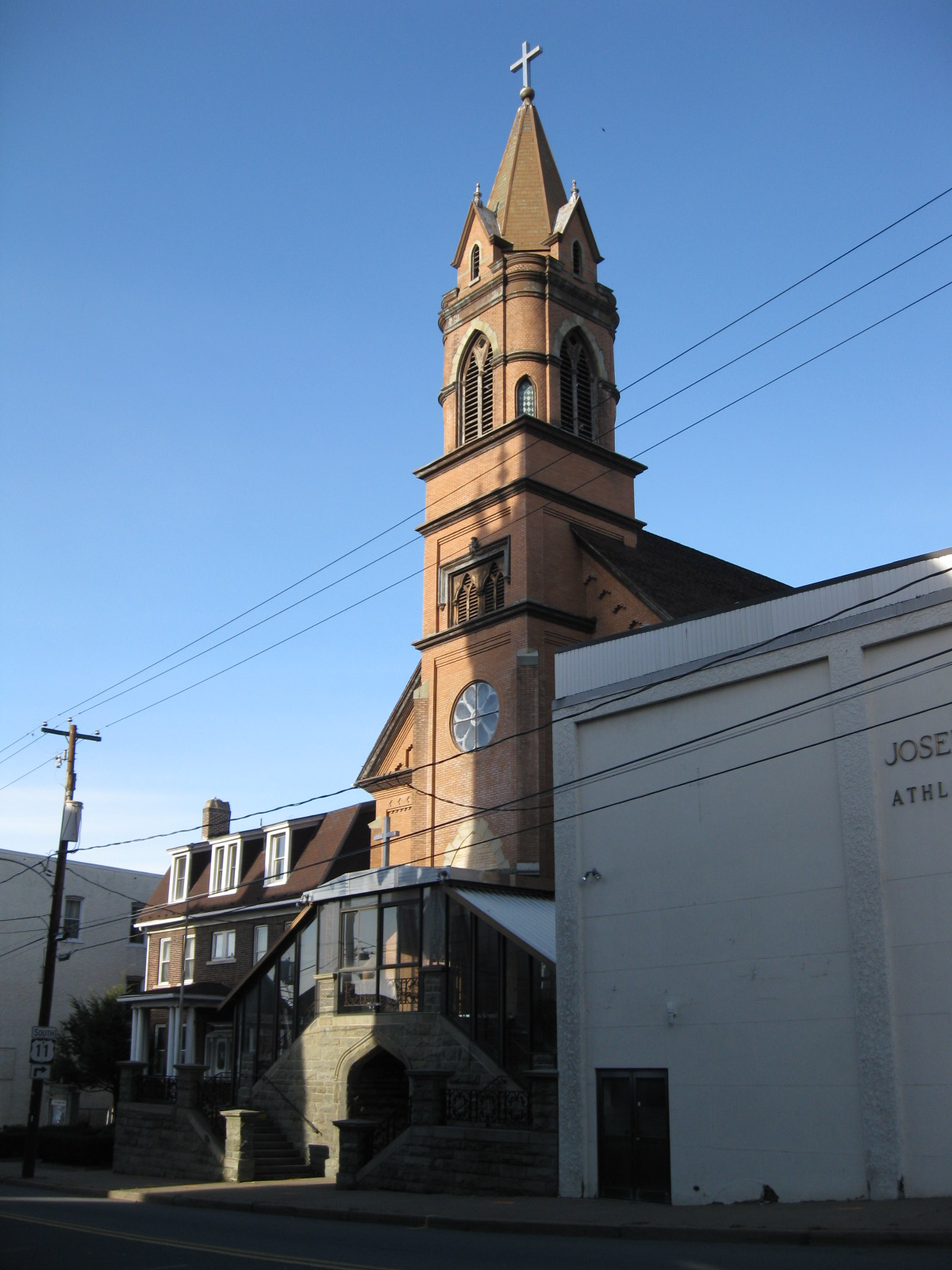
From left to right: Saint John the Baptist School, rectory, church, and gym

Saint John the Baptist Elementary School was a Catholic school located on William Street (41.32357°N 75.78962°W) in Pittston. It was named after the neighboring church (which was first opened in 1892 by Slovak immigrants). Its pastors were Rev. Andrej Kazincy, Rev. Matthew Jankola, Rev. Andrej Pavco, Rev. John J. Bednarcik (who served from 1929-1961), Rev. Michael J. Krupar (who served until his death on Christmas Day in 1964), Monsignor Joseph Super (who served until 1998), Rev. Andrew Strish (who served until 2005), and finally John Bendick (who led the church until it closed in 2008).

On March 27, 2004, Bishop Joseph Martino announced that Saint John the Baptist School and Saint Mary's School in Avoca would close for good. After a legal challenge, the school was closed on Friday, June 4, 2004. The last reverend for the elementary school was Andrew Strish. He administered the last school mass for the nearly 200 students and faculty.

Four years later, in late June 2008, the diocese closed the church as well. From December 2009 to March 2010, the Monsignor Joseph A. Super Athletic Center, the Saint John the Baptist Catholic Information Library, the rectory, the flagpole, the church, and a section of the school were demolished.

== Notable alumni ==
- Jimmy Cefalo
- Charley Trippi
