= Avoca, Pennsylvania =

Borough in Pennsylvania, US

- Borough
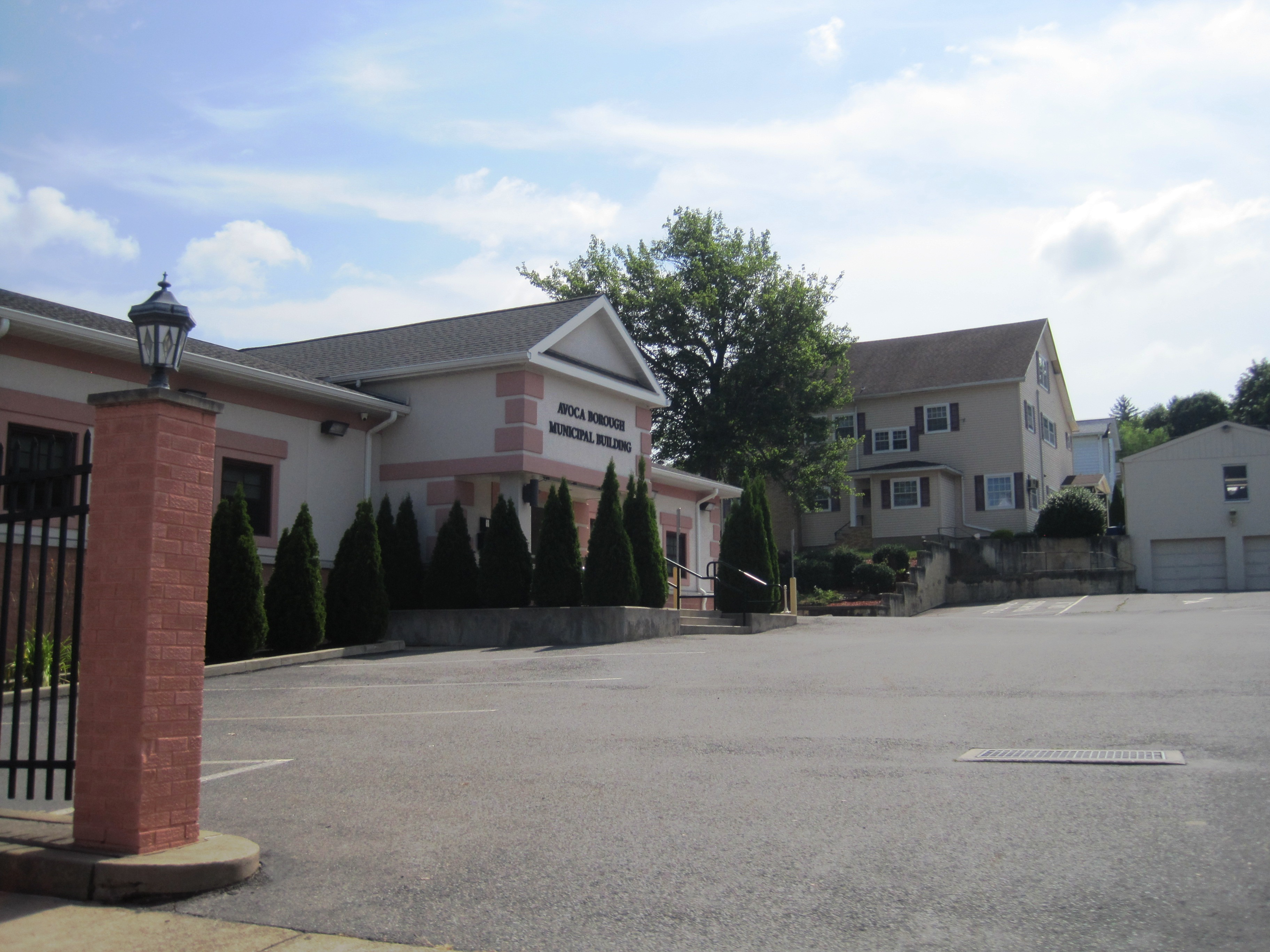
- Municipal Building

- Location of Avoca in Luzerne County, Pennsylvania

- Location within Pennsylvania Location within the United States
- Coordinates: 41°20′20″N 75°44′30″W
- Country: United States
- State: Pennsylvania
- County: Luzerne
- Region: Greater Pittston
- Incorporated: 1871

Government
  - Type: Mayor–council
  - Mayor: Bob Mullen
  - Council: List of council members: *1st Ward: Gary Halagarda (vice president), Holly Homschek (president), Dennis O’Brien; *2nd Ward: Michael Fuller, Jonathan Gedrich, Alan Kiesinger; *3rd Ward: Bob Dommermuth, Jim Emlaw, Kyler Kovaleski

Area
  - Total: 1.02 sq mi (2.64 km^{2})
  - Land: 1.02 sq mi (2.64 km^{2})
  - Water: 0 sq mi (0.00 km^{2})
- Elevation: 735 ft (224 m)

Population (2020)
  - Total: 2,507
  - Density: 2,456.9/sq mi (948.62/km^{2})
- Time zone: UTC-5 (Eastern (EST))
  - Summer (DST): UTC-4 (EDT)
- Zip Code: 18641
- Area code: 570
- FIPS code: 42-03640
- Website: https://avocaborough.com/

Avoca is a borough within the Greater Pittston area of Luzerne County, Pennsylvania, United States. It is located 7.5 miles (12.1 km) northeast of Wilkes Barre and 3.4 miles (5.5 km) southwest of Scranton. The population was 2,501 at the time of the 2020 census. Wilkes-Barre/Scranton International Airport borders Avoca to the east.

== History ==
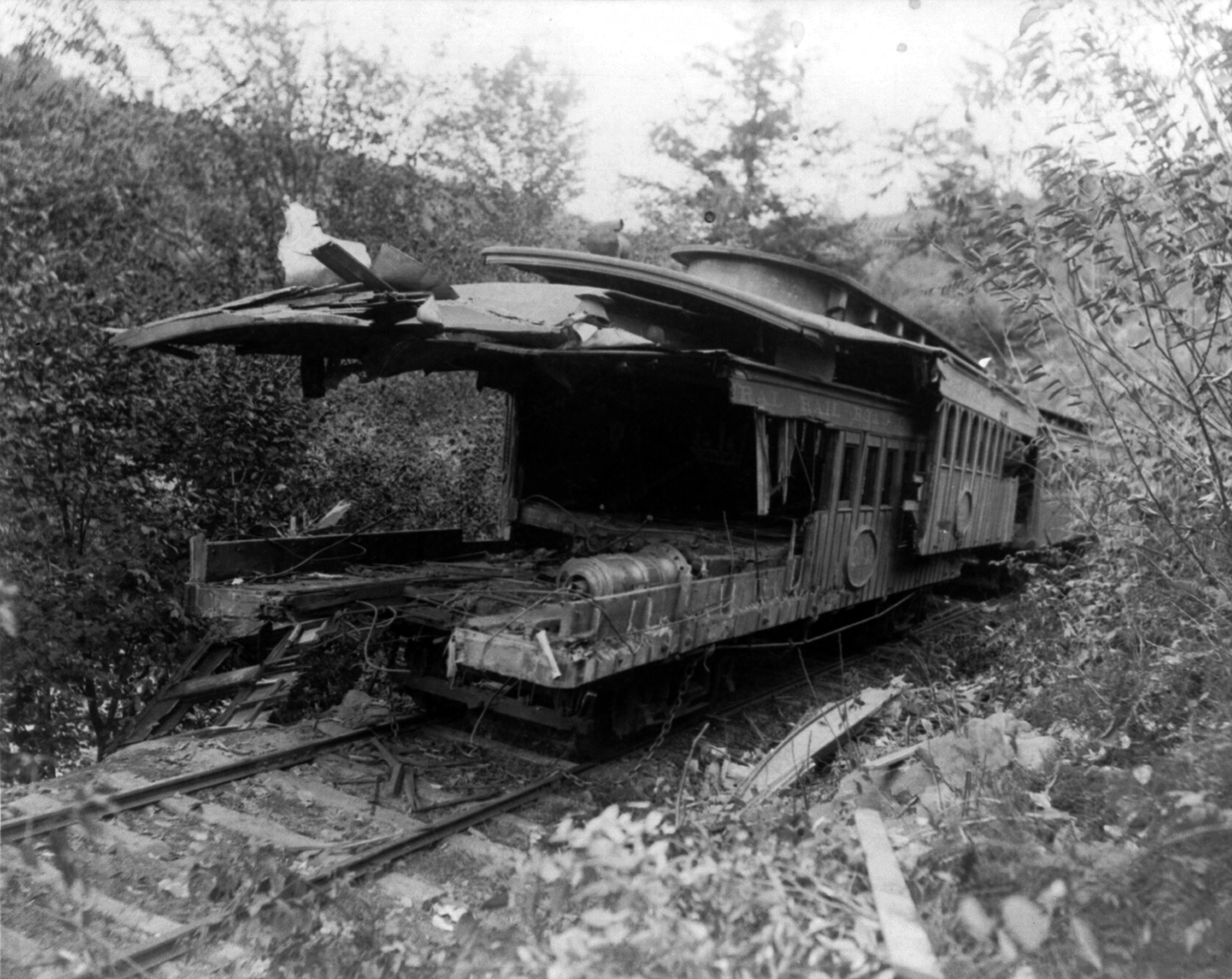
Multiple Avoca residents were killed in the Mud Run disaster in 1888

The community was incorporated as a borough in 1871. Its original name was "Pleasant Valley", and in 1887, it changed to "Avoca", because the name "Pleasant Valley" was already used elsewhere in Pennsylvania. It was named after Avoca, County Wicklow, Ireland.

In 1888, the majority of the 64 people killed in the Mud Run Disaster, a train wreck, were from Avoca.

From 1945 to 1947, the Wilkes-Barre/Scranton International Airport was constructed in and around Avoca. A small portion of the airport was built in Avoca, while most of it was constructed in the neighboring Pittston Township. Coal mining was the chief industry in the borough for many decades. After the 1959 Knox Mine Disaster, the mining industry in the region collapsed.

== Geography ==
According to the U.S. Census Bureau, the borough has a total area of 0.9 square miles (2.3 km^{2}), all of which is land. The borough is served by the Pittston Area School District.

=== Townscape ===
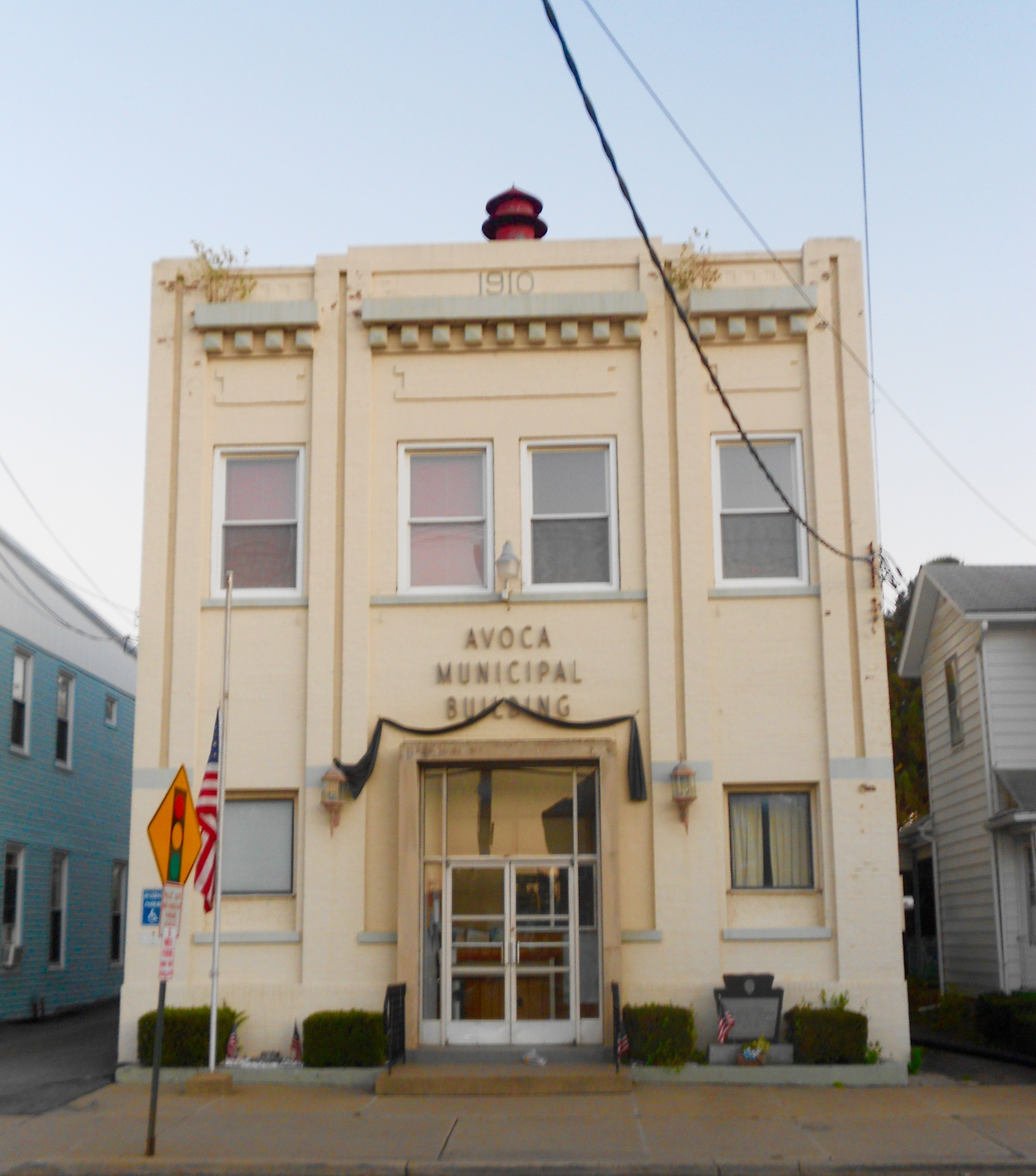
1910 municipal building

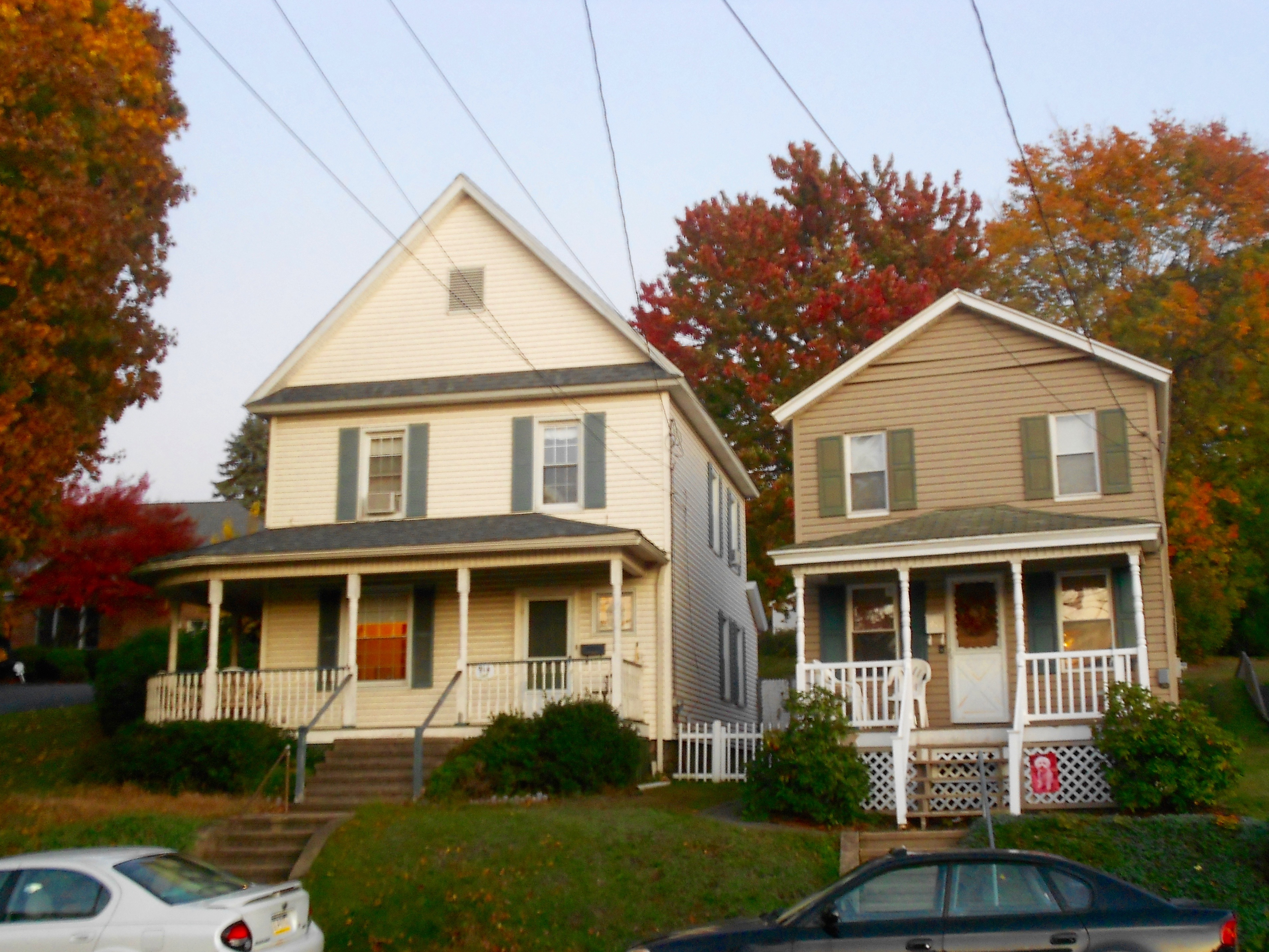
Houses in Avoca

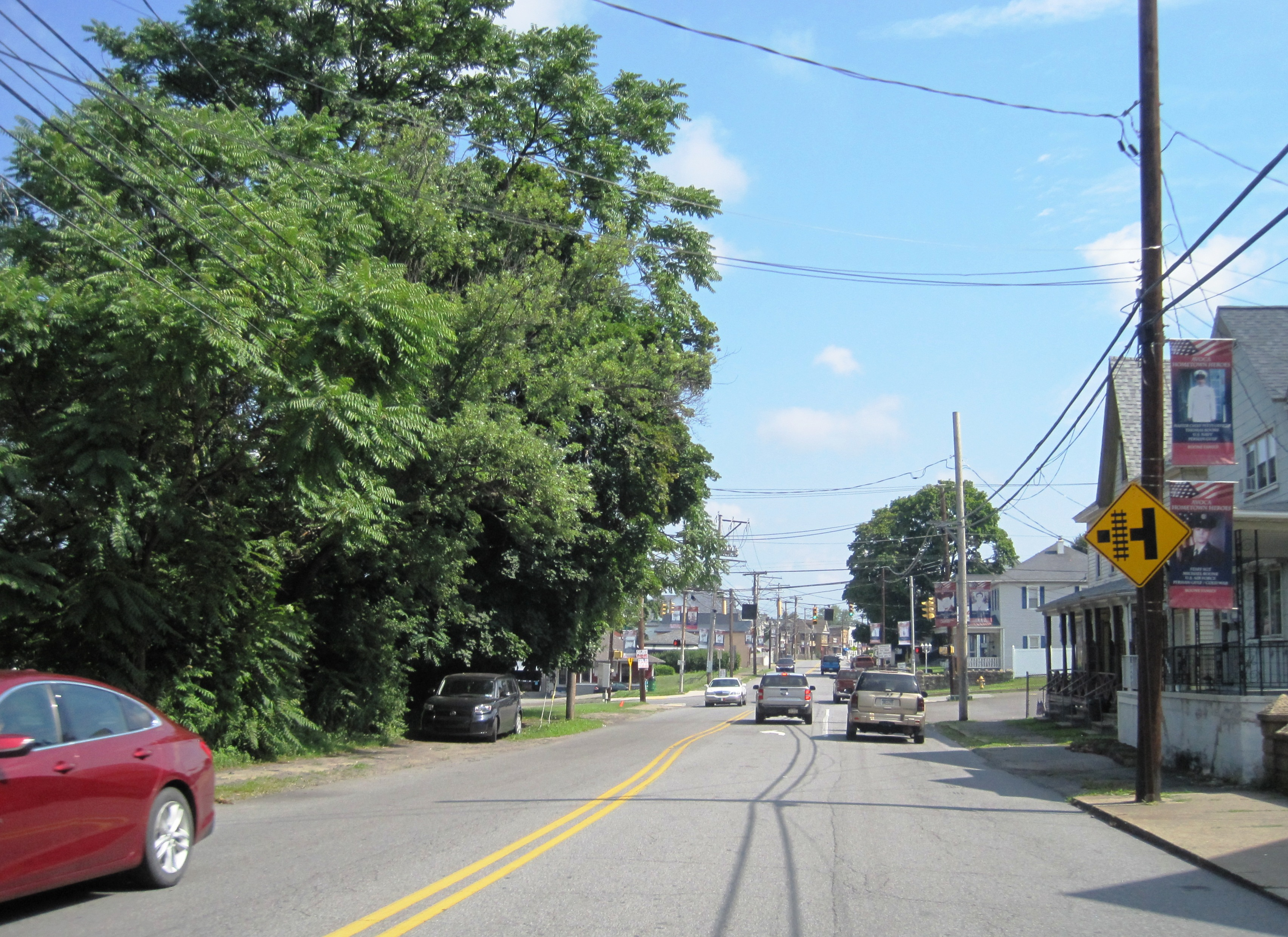
Main Street, Avoca

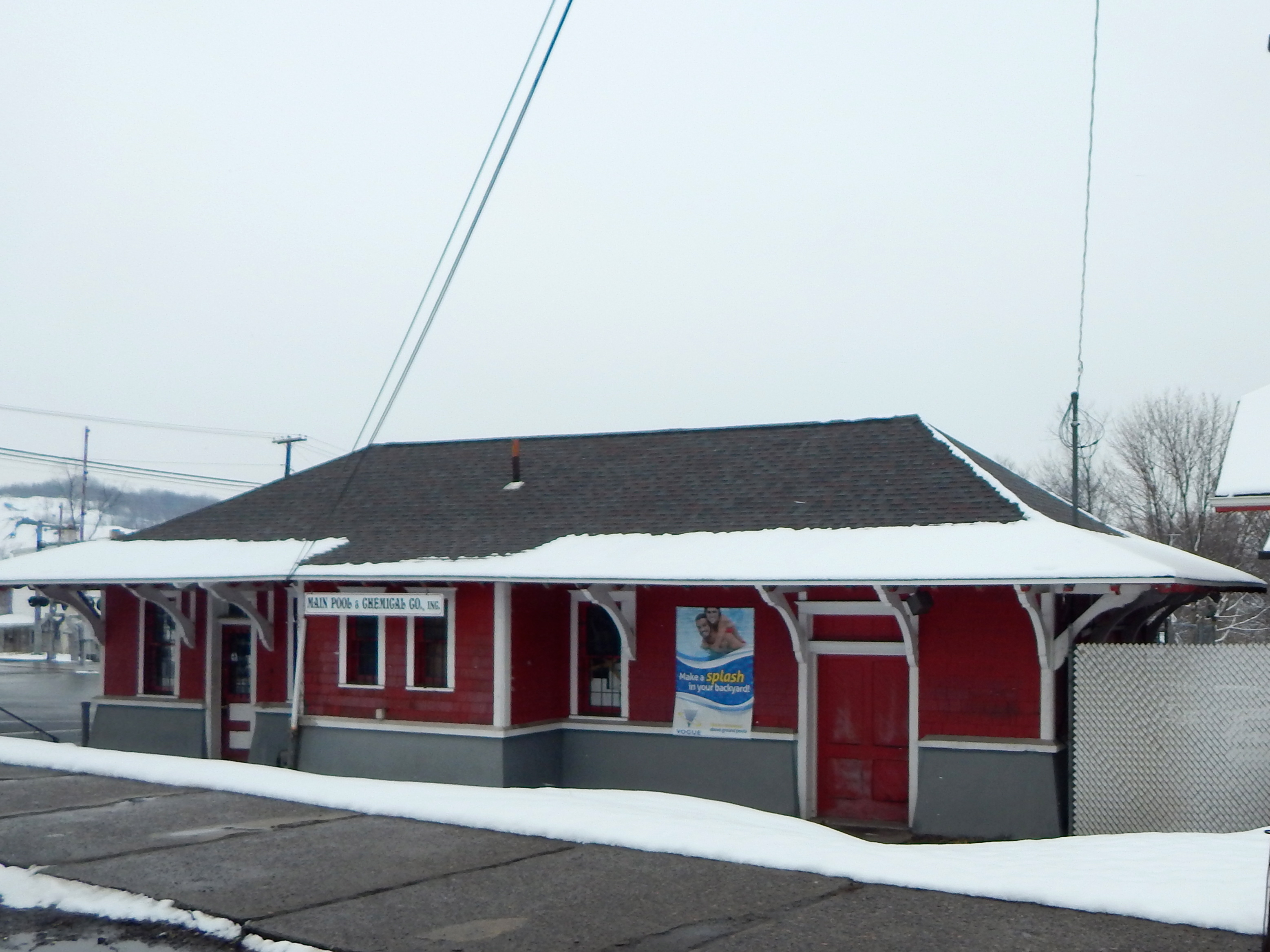
Former railroad station

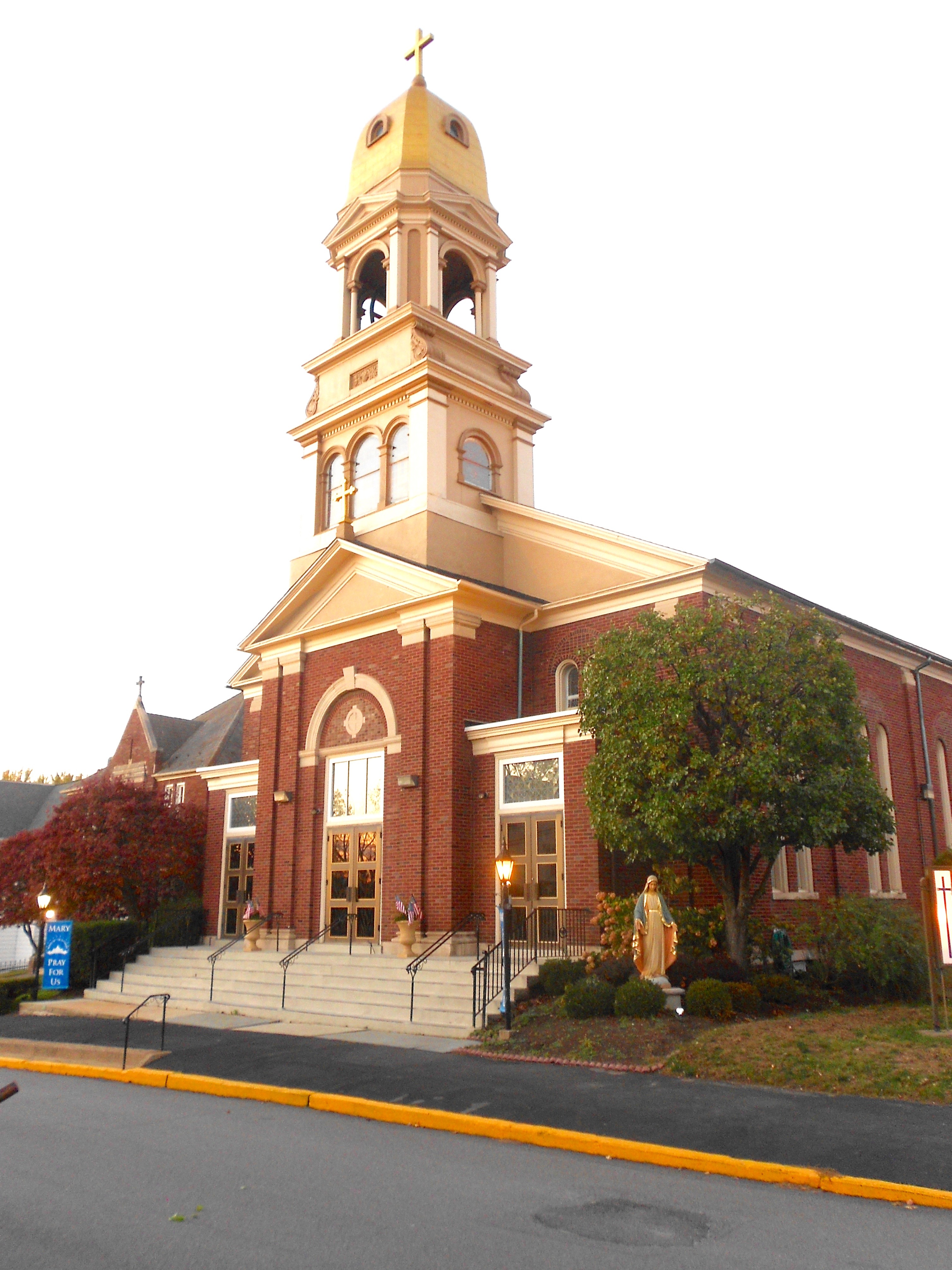
A church in Avoca

== Demographics ==
Historical population
Census	Pop.	Note	%±
1880	1,913		—
1890	3,031		58.4%
1900	3,487		15.0%
1910	4,684		34.3%
1920	4,950		5.7%
1930	4,943		−0.1%
1940	4,771		−3.5%
1950	4,040		−15.3%
1960	3,562		−11.8%
1970	3,543		−0.5%
1980	3,536		−0.2%
1990	2,897		−18.1%
2000	2,851		−1.6%
2010	2,661		−6.7%
2020	2,507		−5.8%
2021 (est.)	2,506	▼	0.0%

As of the census of 2000, there were 2,851 people, 1,177 households, and 787 families residing in the borough. The population density was 3,186.0 inhabitants per square mile (1,230.1/km^{2}). There were 1,267 housing units at an average density of 1,415.9 units per square mile (546.7 units/km^{2}).

The racial makeup of the borough was 99.26% White, 0.14% African American, 0.14% Asian, 0.21% Pacific Islander, 0.11% from other races, and 0.14% from two or more races. Hispanic or Latino of any race were 0.11% of the population.

There were 1,177 households, out of which 27.1% had children under the age of 18 living with them, 51.0% were married couples living together, 11.2% had a female householder with no husband present, and 33.1% were non-families.

30.7% of all households were made up of individuals, and 15.0% had someone living alone who was 65 years of age or older. The average household size was 2.42 and the average family size was 3.06.

In the borough the population was spread out, with 21.2% under the age of 18, 7.3% from 18 to 24, 28.6% from 25 to 44, 24.8% from 45 to 64, and 18.2% who were 65 years of age or older. The median age was 41 years. For every 100 females there were 93.2 males. For every 100 females age 18 and over, there were 88.1 males.

The median income for a household in the borough was $34,973, and the median income for a family was $44,185. Males had a median income of $33,835 versus $27,448 for females. The per capita income for the borough was $17,896. About 5.1% of families and 6.6% of the population were below the poverty line, including 6.6% of those under age 18 and 10.2% of those age 65 or over.

The borough's population peaked in 1920 (with 4,950 residents). The population of Avoca has been in constant decline since the 1930s. The population had fallen to 2,630 by 2017.

== Education ==
It is in the Pittston Area School District.

== Notable people ==
- Michael B. Carroll, member of the Pennsylvania House of Representatives
- Jack Harding, former University of Miami head football coach
