= Yatesville, Pennsylvania =

Borough in Pennsylvania, US

- Borough
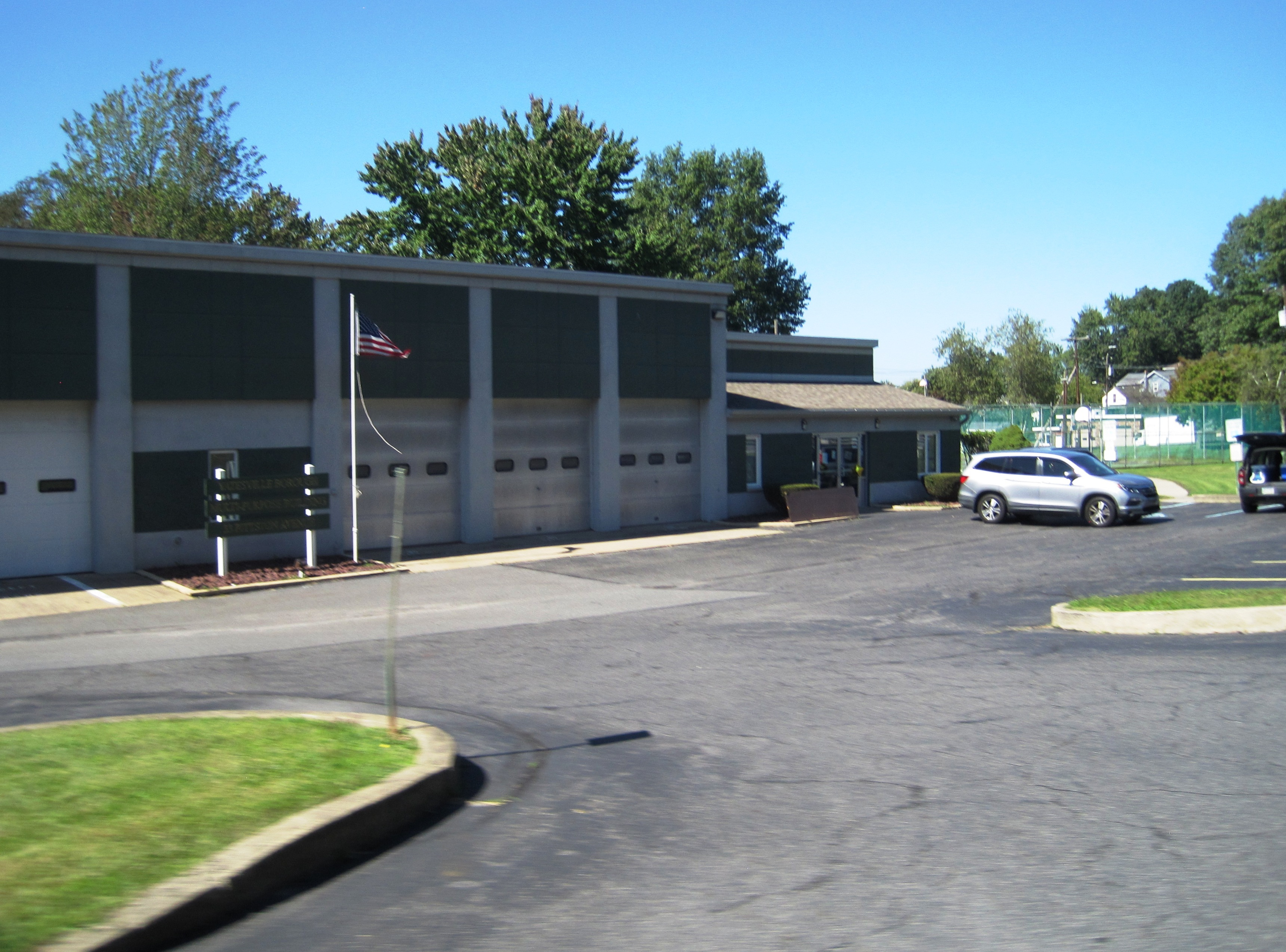
- Yatesville Municipal Building

- Location of Yatesville in Luzerne County, Pennsylvania.

- Location within Pennsylvania Location within the United States
- Coordinates: 41°18′11″N 75°46′54″W
- Country: United States
- State: Pennsylvania
- County: Luzerne
- Region: Greater Pittston
- Settled: 1809
- Incorporated: 1878

Government
  - Type: Borough Council

Area
  - Total: 0.63 sq mi (1.62 km^{2})
  - Land: 0.63 sq mi (1.62 km^{2})
  - Water: 0 sq mi (0.00 km^{2})

Population (2020)
  - Total: 638 ▲
  - Estimate (2021): 639
  - Density: 974.6/sq mi (376.29/km^{2})
- Time zone: UTC-5 (Eastern (EST))
  - Summer (DST): UTC-4 (EDT)
- Area code: 570
- FIPS code: 42-86952

Yatesville is a borough in the Greater Pittston area of Luzerne County, Pennsylvania. The population was 638 as of the 2020 census.

== History ==
In 1809, Joel Hale built the first frame house in what is now known as Yatesville. Mr. Hale owned most of the borough site. The settlement grew slowly as an agricultural and early industrial pocket within Jenkins Township. It was officially named after Francis Yates, an English immigrant who purchased 90 acres of local land in 1817 and settled into a log cabin with his family.

The town's early economy and identity were shaped by the regional anthracite coal boom, with Francis Yates and the Hale brothers noted as some of the very first locals to participate in mining the coal by stripping outcrops and hauling the fuel with ox teams. As infrastructure expanded, the Pennsylvania Coal Company built a vital water reservoir to power local works, and multiple railroad lines established depots to transport the "black diamonds" mined from the valley. On May 20, 1878, Yatesville officially broke away from Jenkins Township and was incorporated as an independent borough, electing T. T. Hale as its very first burgess in June.

In the modern era, Yatesville has transitioned into a quiet, entirely landbound residential borough covering just 0.63 square miles in the Greater Pittston area. While its heavy mining days have passed, the community preserves its close-knit Northeastern Pennsylvania heritage through local institutions like the Yatesville Bocce Club, which has kept traditions alive since 1979.

== Geography ==
Yatesville is located at 41°18′11″N 75°46′54″W (41.302947, -75.781651). According to the United States Census Bureau, the borough has a total area of 0.62 square miles (1.6 km^{2}), all land. The borough is served by the Pittston Area School District.

=== Townscape ===
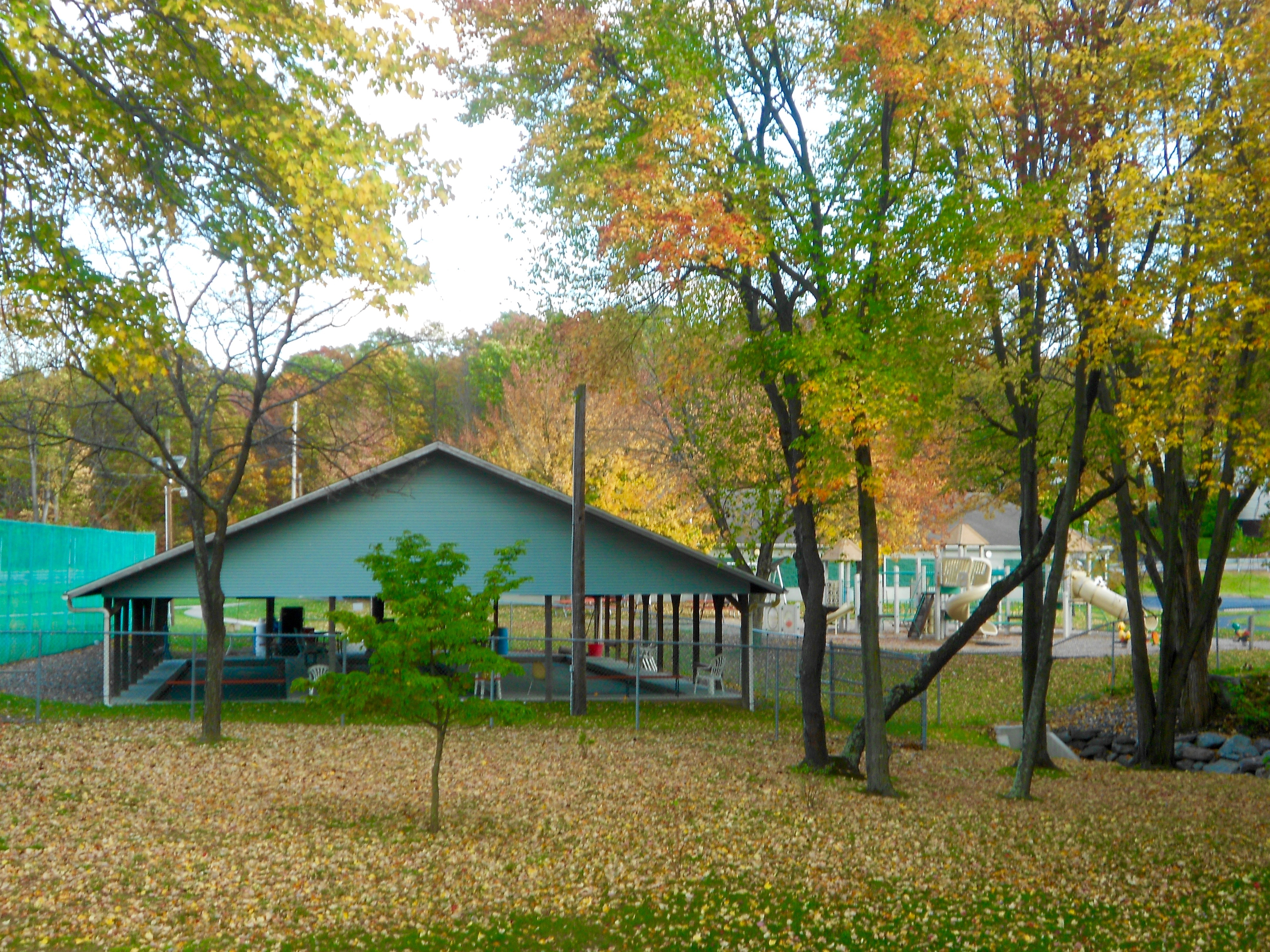
Park in Yatesville

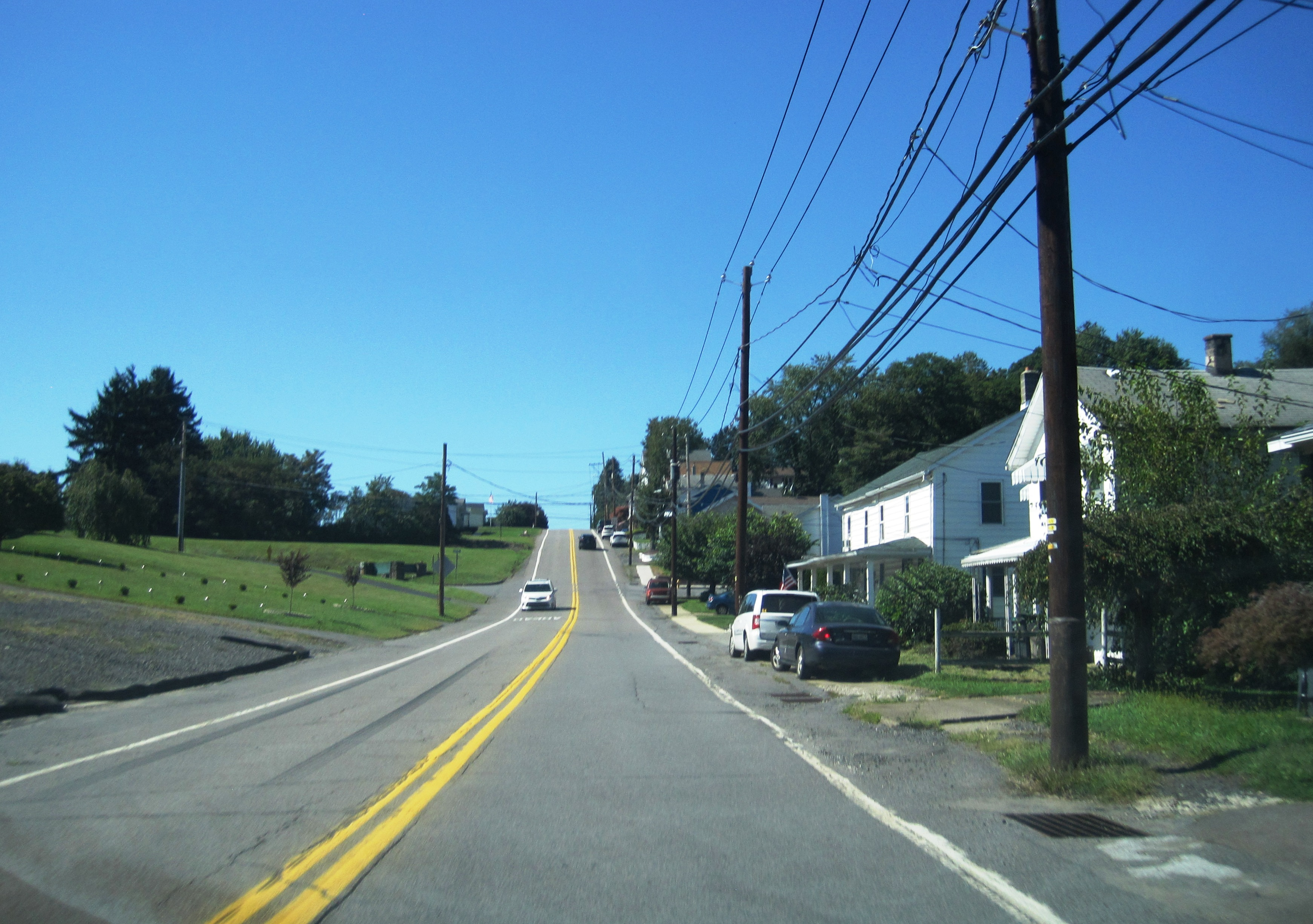
Stout Street in Yatesville

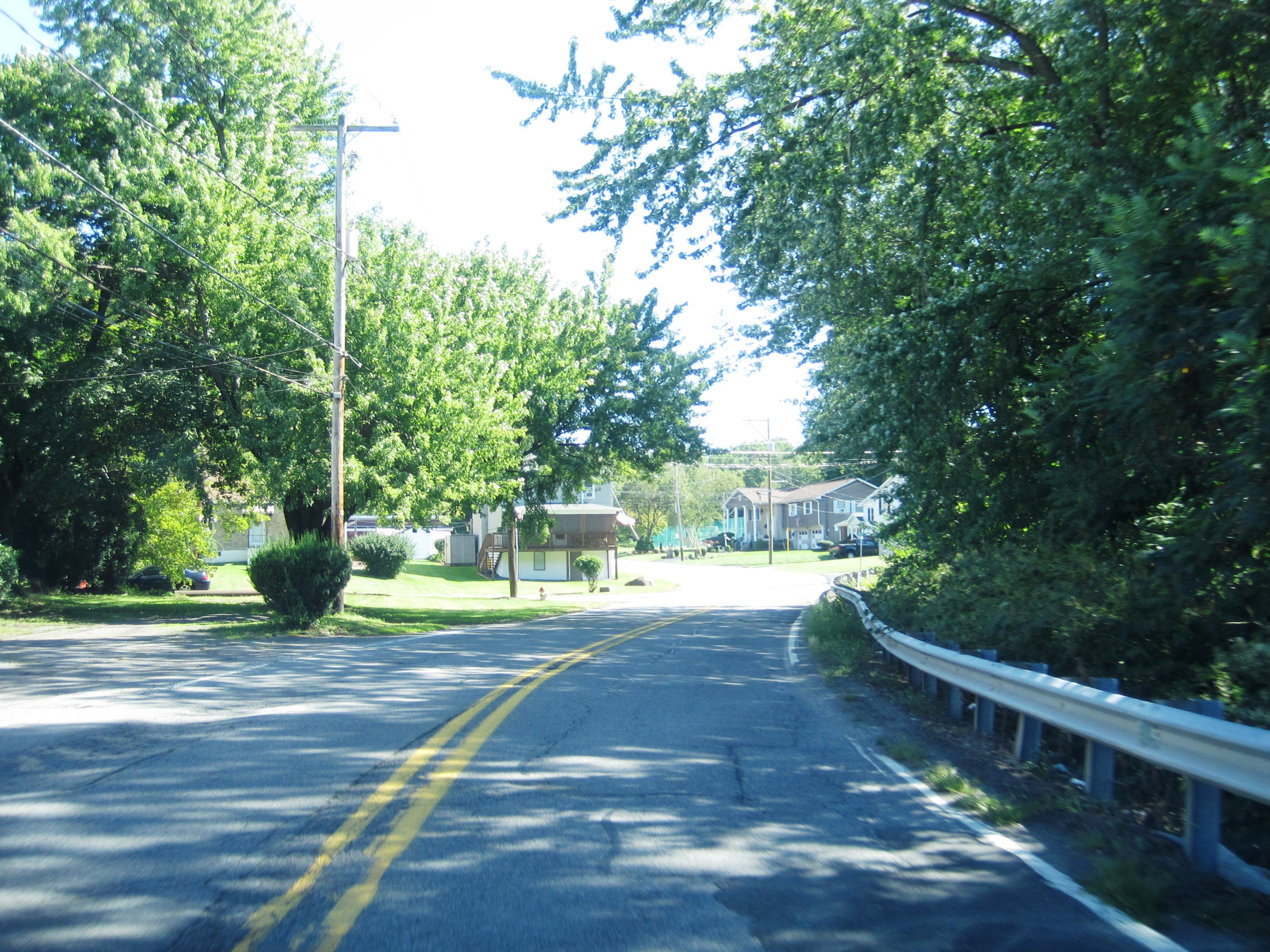
Pittston Avenue in Yatesville

== Demographics ==
Historical population
Census	Pop.	Note	%±
1880	415		—
1890	414		−0.2%
1900	433		4.6%
1910	573		32.3%
1920	709		23.7%
1930	768		8.3%
1940	700		−8.9%
1950	565		−19.3%
1960	472		−16.5%
1970	407		−13.8%
1980	555		36.4%
1990	506		−8.8%
2000	649		28.3%
2010	607		−6.5%
2020	638		5.1%
2021 (est.)	639	▲	0.2%

At the 2000 census there were 649 people, 233 households, and 188 families in the borough. The population density was 1,171.1 inhabitants per square mile (452.2/km^{2}). There were 241 housing units at an average density of 434.9 per square mile (167.9/km^{2}). The racial makeup of the borough was 99.69% White, 0.15% African American, and 0.15% from two or more races. There were 233 households, 31.8% had children under the age of 18 living with them, 63.5% were married couples living together, 12.9% had a female householder with no husband present, and 18.9% were non-families. 16.3% of households were made up of individuals, and 7.3% were one person aged 65 or older. The average household size was 2.79 and the average family size was 3.11.

The age distribution was 22.8% under the age of 18, 6.0% from 18 to 24, 31.7% from 25 to 44, 25.4% from 45 to 64, and 14.0% 65 or older. The median age was 38 years. For every 100 females there were 80.3 males. For every 100 females age 18 and over, there were 82.8 males.

The median household income was $46,429 and the median family income was $57,813. Males had a median income of $41,176 versus $23,333 for females. The per capita income for the borough was $24,551. About 1.5% of families and 2.9% of the population were below the poverty line, including 2.6% of those under age 18 and 5.6% of those age 65 or over.

== Education ==
It is in the Pittston Area School District.
