= Greater Pittston =

- Subregion
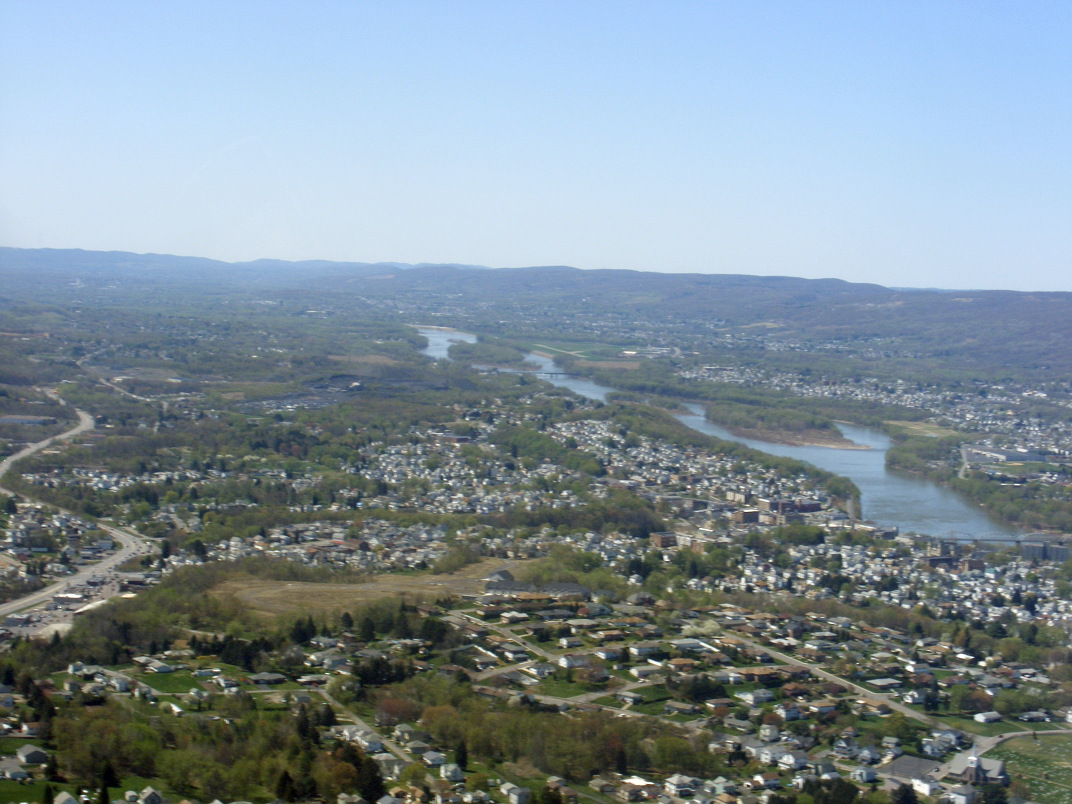
- Aerial view of Greater Pittston. Pittston City can be seen on the right (along the Susquehanna River).

- Greater Pittston in Luzerne County, Pennsylvania Greater Pittston (the United States)
- Coordinates: 41°19′26″N 75°47′20″W
- Country: United States
- State: Pennsylvania
- County: Luzerne
- Principal city: Pittston

Area
  - Total: 65.35 sq mi (169.3 km^{2})

Population (2010)
  - Total: 48,020
  - Density: 734.8/sq mi (283.7/km^{2})
- Time zone: UTC-5 (EST)
  - Summer (DST): UTC-4 (EDT)
- Area code: 570

Greater Pittston is a 65.35 mi^{2} (169.3 km^{2}) locality in northeastern Luzerne County, Pennsylvania, in reference to the area in and around Pittston. It is a subregion of Wyoming Valley. As of 2010, the total population of Greater Pittston is 48,020. This region includes Avoca, Dupont, Duryea, Exeter Boro, Exeter Township, Hughestown, Jenkins Township, Laflin, Pittston Township, West Pittston, West Wyoming, Wyoming, and Yatesville.

== History ==
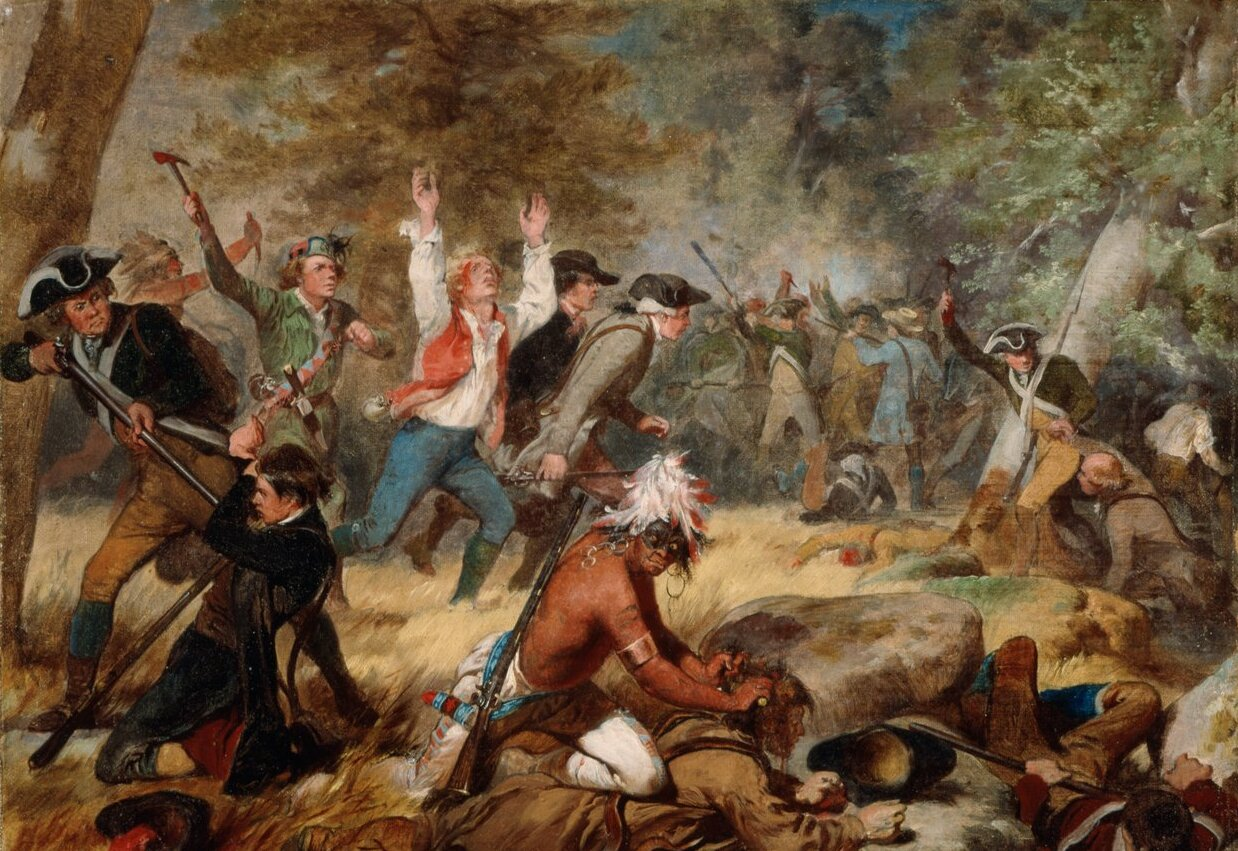
The Battle of Wyoming in 1778

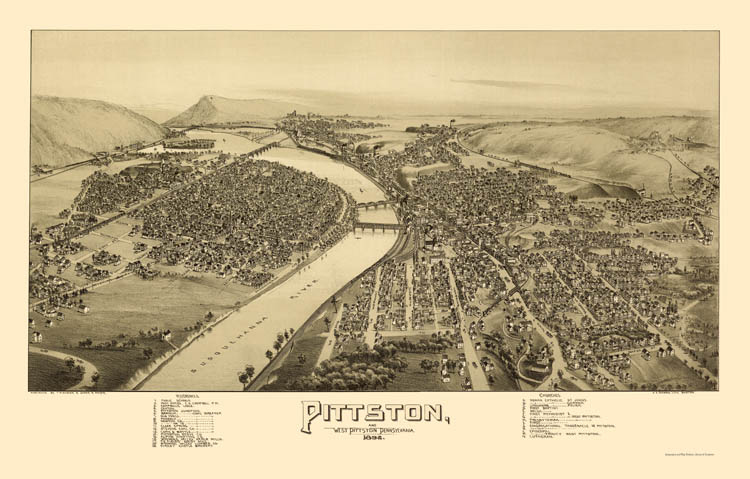
Pittston as depicted on an 1892 panoramic map

Hundreds gather at the site of the Twin Shaft Disaster immediately after the cave-in (1896).

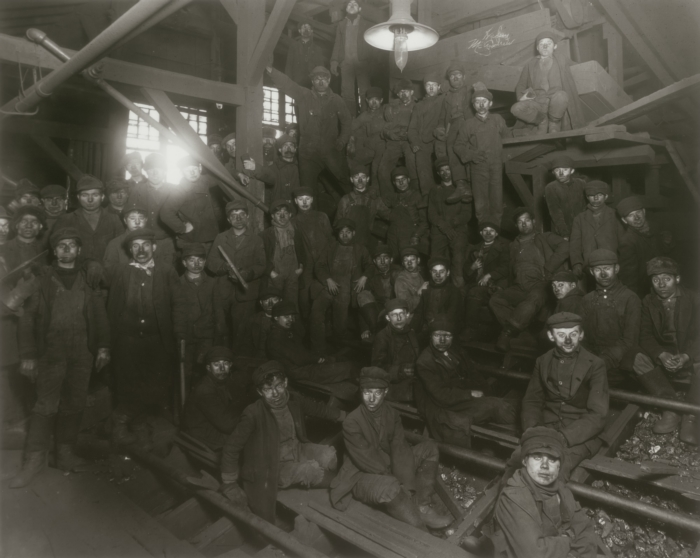
Child laborers at a Pittston coal mine (in 1911). The photo was taken by Lewis Hine.

The Greater Pittston Historical Society discovers, collects, studies, and preserves the history of the region. It makes that history available to the general public, public schools, researchers and historians.

- 1770s: American settlers started to settle in the Wyoming Valley of Northeastern Pennsylvania.
- 1 July 1778: During the Revolutionary War, Fort Jenkins (a patriot stockade in present-day West Pittston) surrendered to Loyalist forces under Major John Butler. It was later burned to the ground.
- 3 July 1778: A force of Loyalist soldiers, led by John Butler, with the assistance of about 700 Indians, attacked and totally defeated a force of 360 American troops, killing 302. Today in the Borough of Wyoming, a monument marks the gravesite of the American dead from the Battle of Wyoming.
- 4 July 1778: Fort Pittston (located in what is now Pittston City) surrendered to the British and parts of the fort were subsequently demolished. It was later restored and used until the end of the Revolutionary War.
- September 1778: Revenge for the Wyoming defeat was taken by American Colonel Thomas Hartley who, with 200 soldiers, burned nine to twelve Seneca, Delaware and Mingo villages along the Susquehanna River in northeast Pennsylvania, including Tioga and Chemung.
- 1833: The Wyoming Monument was constructed in Wyoming to commemorate the 1778 battle and the gravesite of the American dead from the battle.
- 28 June 1896: The Newton Coal Company's Twin Shaft Mine in Pittston City caved-in and killed 58 miners.
- 1908 – 1912: The anthracite coal mining industry, and its extensive use of child labor in the early part of the 20th century, was one of the industries targeted by the National Child Labor Committee and its hired photographer, Lewis Hine. Many of Hine's subjects were photographed in the mines and coal fields in and around Pittston during this time. The impact of the Hine photographs led to the enactment of child labor laws across the country.
- 3 July 1920: Three trains collided on the Lackawanna and Wyoming Valley Railroad, known as the Laurel Line, in the village of Sebastopol in Jenkins Township. Eighteen people were killed and thirty more were injured.
- 1930s – 1980s: Pittston City emerged as a national center for clothing manufacturing. Thousands of workers, mainly women, labored in many factories throughout the Greater Pittston area. One such woman was Susan Sebastianelli of Pittston Township. Most were members of the International Ladies' Garment Workers' Union (ILGWU) that gained higher wages, workplace health & safety improvements, and employee rights. The ILGWU was active in civic and political life throughout Pennsylvania.
- 1934: The right arm of Hughestown resident, Harry Tompkins, was crushed by an Erie Railroad train. This resulted in the U.S. Supreme Court case, Erie Railroad Co. v. Tompkins, which laid the foundation for a large part of modern American civil procedure.
- 1945 – 1947: Construction of the Wilkes-Barre/Scranton International Airport took place near the Borough of Avoca.
- 22 January 1959: The Knox Mine Disaster in Port Griffith, Jenkins Township, claimed the lives of 12 people and essentially shut down the mining industry in Northeastern Pennsylvania.
- June 1972: Hurricane Agnes was responsible for massive flooding in and around the Greater Pittston area.
- 1974 – 1989: Alleged ghost hauntings took place in the home of Jack and Janet Smurl in West Pittston, inspiring the 1991 film The Haunted.
- 25 September 1982: George Banks kills 13 people in a shooting rampage in Wilkes-Barre and Jenkins Township.
- 1992: The opening scenes from the movie School Ties was filmed in West Pittston; it shows David Green, the hero of the movie (played by Brendan Fraser), hanging out with friends in the streets of the tiny town.
- 15 March 1993: Two Pittston firefighters (John Lombardo and Len Insalaco) were killed while fighting a blaze in the city's downtown. A monument was built and the nearby Water Street Bridge was renamed to commemorate their sacrifice.
- 2008: The "kids for cash scandal" unfolded over judicial kickbacks at the Luzerne County Court of Common Pleas in Wilkes-Barre, Pennsylvania. Two judges, President Judge Mark Ciavarella and Senior Judge Michael Conahan, were convicted of accepting money from Robert Mericle, builder of two private, for-profit youth centers for the detention of juveniles. One center was PA Child Care (in Pittston Township).
- 2011: The Borough of Duryea received national attention for its role in the landmark Supreme Court case Borough of Duryea v. Guarnieri, in which the court stated that "a government employer's allegedly retaliatory actions against an employee do not give rise to liability under the Petition Clause unless the employee's petition relates to a matter of public concern."
- September 2011: The Greater Pittston area, along with the rest of Luzerne County, witnessed historical flooding from Tropical Storm Lee. The Susquehanna River reached a record high of 42.6 feet (13.0 meters) in Wilkes-Barre. The river topped the 40.9-foot (12.5-meter) level in flooding caused by Hurricane Agnes in 1972.

=== Establishment ===
Name of community	Date incorporated (declaration of a municipal charter)
Exeter Township	1783
Pittston Township	1790
Jenkins Township	1852
Pittston Borough/City	1853 (borough); 1894 (city)
West Pittston Borough	1857
Avoca Borough	1871
Yatesville Borough	1878
Hughestown Borough	1879
Exeter Borough	1884
Wyoming Borough	1885
Laflin Borough	1889
Duryea Borough	1891
West Wyoming Borough	1898
Dupont Borough	1917

== Geography ==
A map of Luzerne County. Greater Pittston, which makes up the northeastern portion of the county, is outlined in yellow.

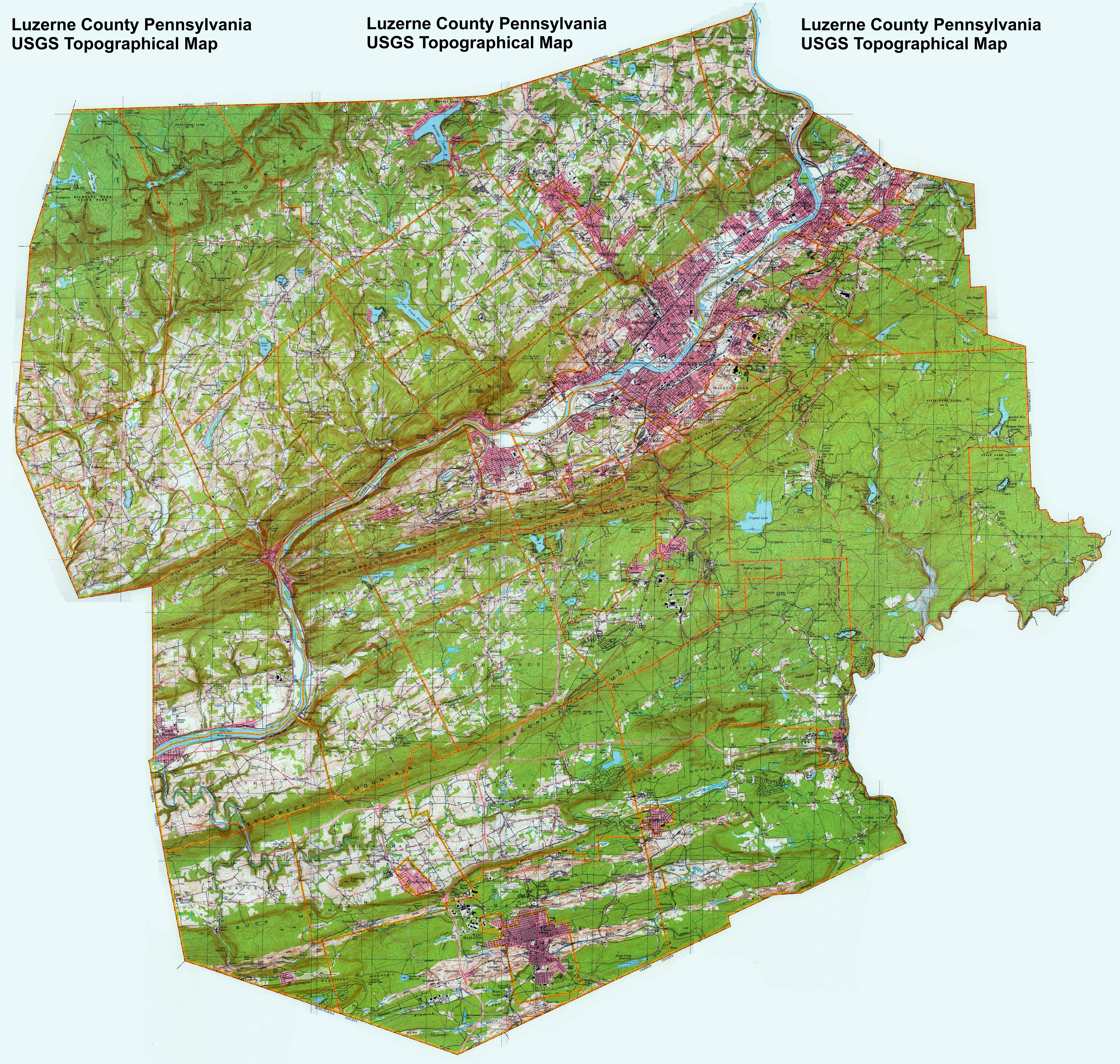
A topographic map of Luzerne County. Greater Pittston makes up the northeastern section of the county.

Greater Pittston is a 65.35 mi^{2} (169.3 km^{2}) region in Luzerne County, Pennsylvania, encompassing the Susquehanna River. Jenkins Township is the largest municipality with a total area of 13.98 mi^{2} (36.2 km^{2}). Yatesville is the smallest community in Greater Pittston. It covers a total area of only 0.62 mi^{2} (1.6 km^{2}).

=== Ranking by area ===
The ranking of the following table is based on the area (or square mileage) of each community within Greater Pittston.

† principal city

Rank	City/Town/etc.	Municipal type	Total Square Miles (km^{2})
1	Jenkins Township	Township	13.98 mi^{2} (36.2 km^{2})
2	Pittston Township	Township	13.79 mi^{2} (35.7 km^{2})
3	Exeter Township	Township	13.5 mi^{2} (35 km^{2})
4	Duryea	Borough	5.75 mi^{2} (14.9 km^{2})
5	Exeter	Borough	4.98 mi^{2} (12.9 km^{2})
6	West Wyoming	Borough	3.6 mi^{2} (9.3 km^{2})
7	† Pittston	City	1.7 mi^{2} (4.4 km^{2})
8	Wyoming	Borough	1.6 mi^{2} (4.1 km^{2})
9	Dupont	Borough	1.5 mi^{2} (3.9 km^{2})
10	Laflin	Borough	1.35 mi^{2} (3.5 km^{2})
11	Avoca	Borough	1.08 mi^{2} (2.8 km^{2})
12	West Pittston	Borough	0.97 mi^{2} (2.5 km^{2})
13	Hughestown	Borough	0.93 mi^{2} (2.4 km^{2})
14	Yatesville	Borough	0.62 mi^{2} (1.6 km^{2})
Total	Greater Pittston	Region	65.35 mi^{2} (169.3 km^{2})

== Population ==
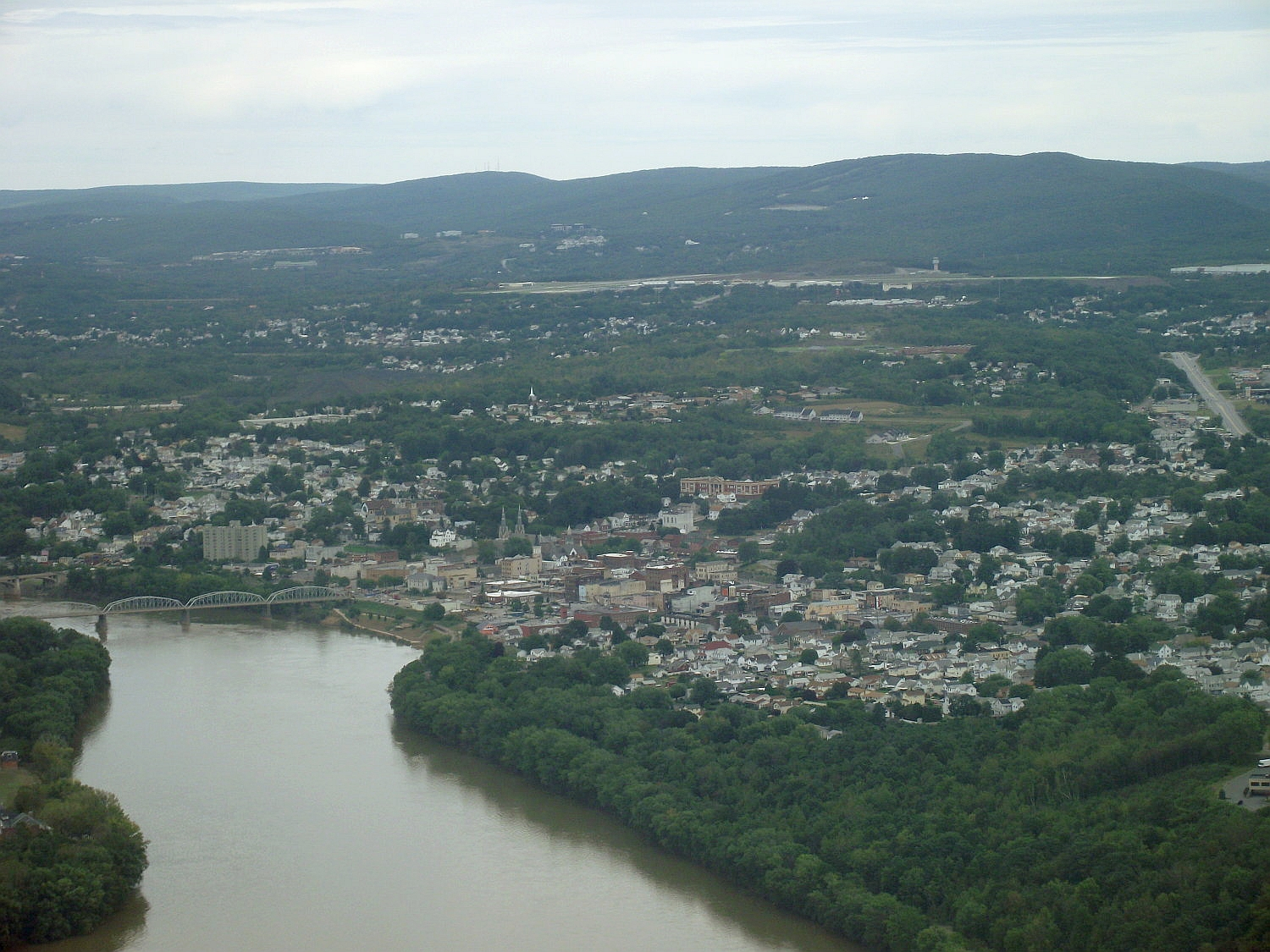
Pittston City is the most populous community in Greater Pittston.

According to the 2010 census, 48,020 people live in and around Pittston City. Pittston has the highest population with 7,739 citizens. Yatesville has the smallest population with around 600 citizens.

=== Population ranking ===
The population ranking of the following table is based on the 2010 census of Greater Pittston.

† principal city

Rank	City/Town/etc.	Municipal type	Population (2010 Census)
1	† Pittston	City	7,739
2	Exeter	Borough	5,652
3	Duryea	Borough	4,917
4	West Pittston	Borough	4,868
5	Jenkins Township	Township	4,442
6	Pittston Township	Township	3,368
7	Wyoming	Borough	3,073
8	West Wyoming	Borough	2,725
9	Dupont	Borough	2,711
10	Avoca	Borough	2,661
11	Exeter Township	Township	2,378
12	Laflin	Borough	1,487
13	Hughestown	Borough	1,392
14	Yatesville	Borough	607
Total	Greater Pittston	Region	48,020

=== Demographics ===
- Demographics of Avoca
- Demographics of Dupont
- Demographics of Duryea
- Demographics of Exeter
- Demographics of Exeter Township
- Demographics of Hughestown
- Demographics of Jenkins Township
- Demographics of Laflin
- Demographics of Pittston City
- Demographics of Pittston Township
- Demographics of West Pittston
- Demographics of West Wyoming
- Demographics of Wyoming
- Demographics of Yatesville

== Government ==
Each municipality (city, borough, and township) has its own form of government. Each city and borough is headed by an elected mayor. Each township is governed by a board of supervisors/commissioners.

== Economy ==
The Greater Pittston Chamber of Commerce has supported the area's business development since 1920.

== Public safety ==
There are many fire and police departments scattered throughout Greater Pittston. The firefighters provide fire protection for all of its citizens. The police provide full-time protection to its citizens, visitors, businesses, and public property.

== Healthcare ==
There are many healthcare clinics scattered throughout Greater Pittston. The following list is a small sample of health clinics in the region.

- Garden Village Medical Center, West Pittston
- Geisinger Medical Group, Pittston
- Geisinger Pittston, Pittston
- Geisinger, Wyoming
- Intermountain Medical Group, Dupont
- The Care and Concern Free Health Clinic, Pittston

The Greater Pittston Regional Ambulance (GPRA) is the basic and advanced life support provider for the region.

== Education ==
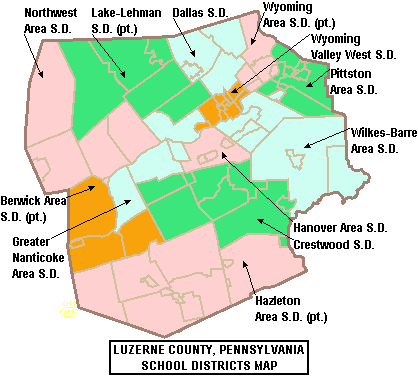
Pittston Area, Wyoming Area, and Wilkes-Barre Area School Districts are located in the northeastern corner of Luzerne County (they can be seen in green, pink, and blue).

=== Public school districts ===
- Pittston Area School District
- Wyoming Area School District
- Wilkes-Barre Area School District

=== Private schools ===
- Holy Rosary Elementary School, Duryea
- New Story School, Wyoming
- Wyoming Area Catholic Elementary School, Exeter

=== Libraries ===
- Pittston Memorial Library, Pittston City
- West Pittston Library, West Pittston
- Wyoming Free Library, Wyoming

== Transportation ==
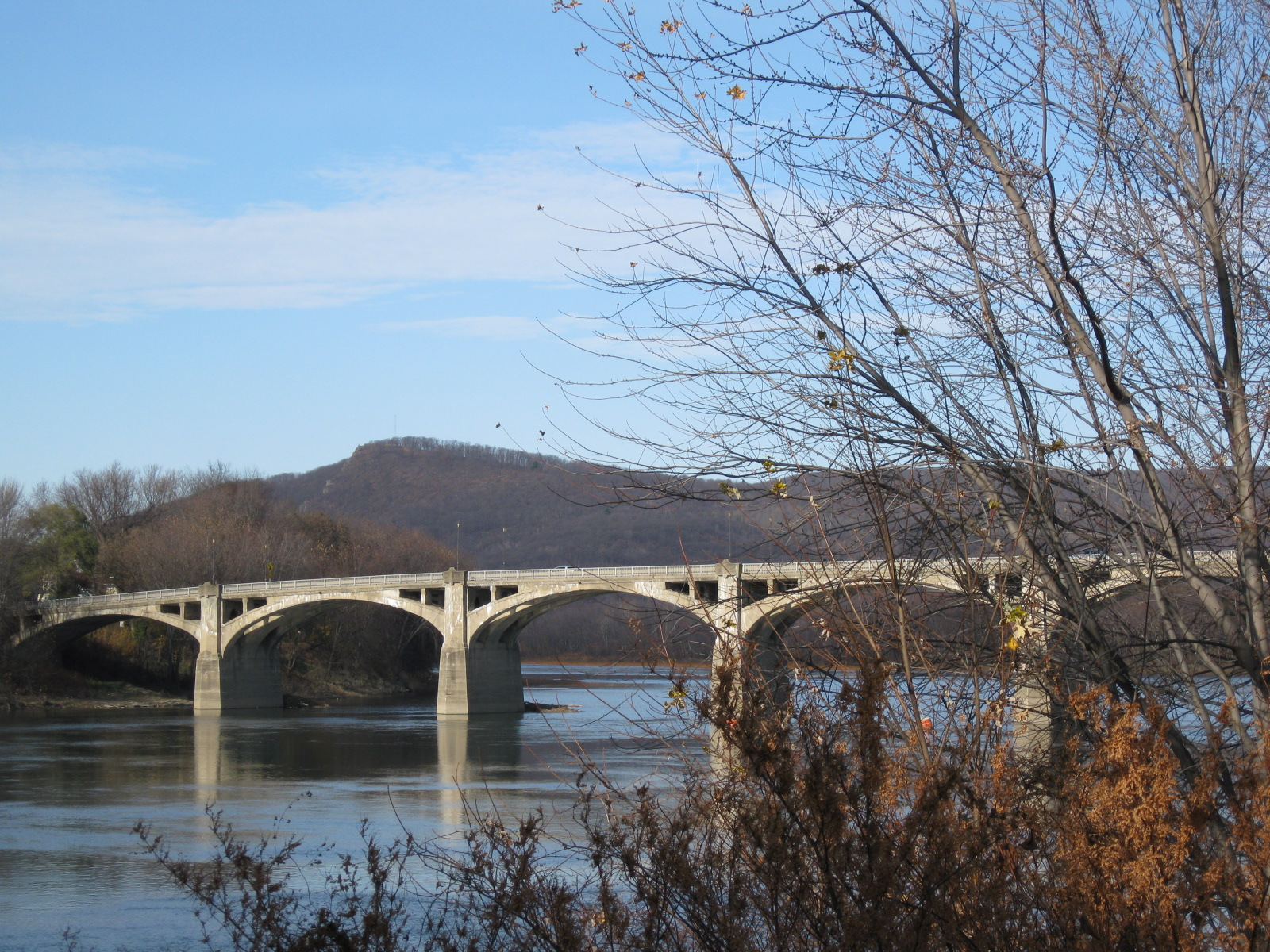
Specialist Dale J. Kridlo Memorial Bridge (U.S. Route 11)

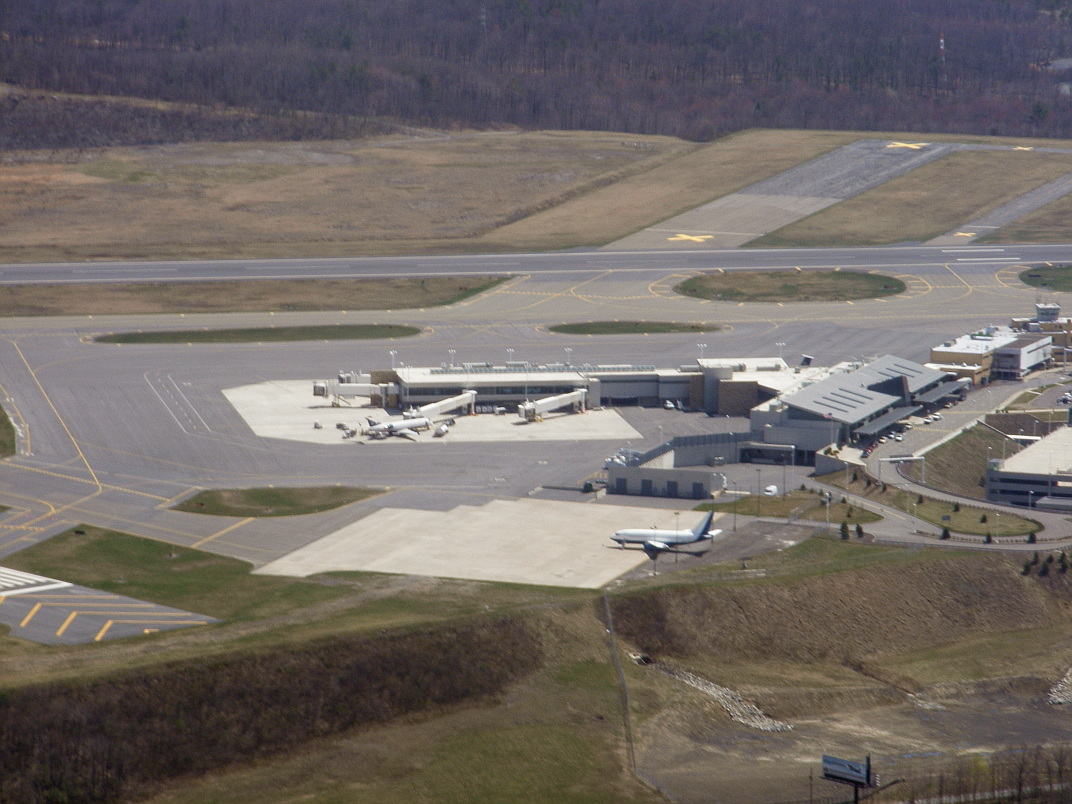
Wilkes-Barre/Scranton Airport

=== Highways ===
Interstate 81 passes near Pittston, heading north to Binghamton and south to Harrisburg. Pittston is also located near the Northeast Extension of the Pennsylvania Turnpike, Interstate 476, providing a link to Allentown and Philadelphia. U.S. Route 11, Pennsylvania Route 92, Pennsylvania Route 315, and Pennsylvania Route 502 can also be found within the region.

=== Public transportation ===
Pittston is served by the Luzerne County Transportation Authority and COLTS, which provides bus services to the city and other communities within Luzerne County and Lackawanna County. Martz Trailways also provides commuter, tour, and trip service from Pittston, and nearby locations in downtown Scranton and Wilkes-Barre to points east and south, such as Philadelphia, New York City, and Atlantic City.

=== Air ===
The Wilkes-Barre/Scranton International Airport is located in Pittston Township. The airport is served by eight international airlines and has hosted Air Force One on regional presidential visits several times in the past. In the spring of 2002, the airport began offering an increased number of non-stop flights across the nation. Service is provided by Allegiant, Delta, United Airlines, and American Airlines.

=== Rail ===
At present, the Reading Blue Mountain & Northern Railroad, Canadian Pacific Railway (successor to the Delaware and Hudson) and the Luzerne & Susquehanna Railroad (designated-operator of the county-owned shortline) provide freight service within the city and Pittston Township. A proposed nearby commuter train from Scranton to New York City has received government funding.

== Notable people ==
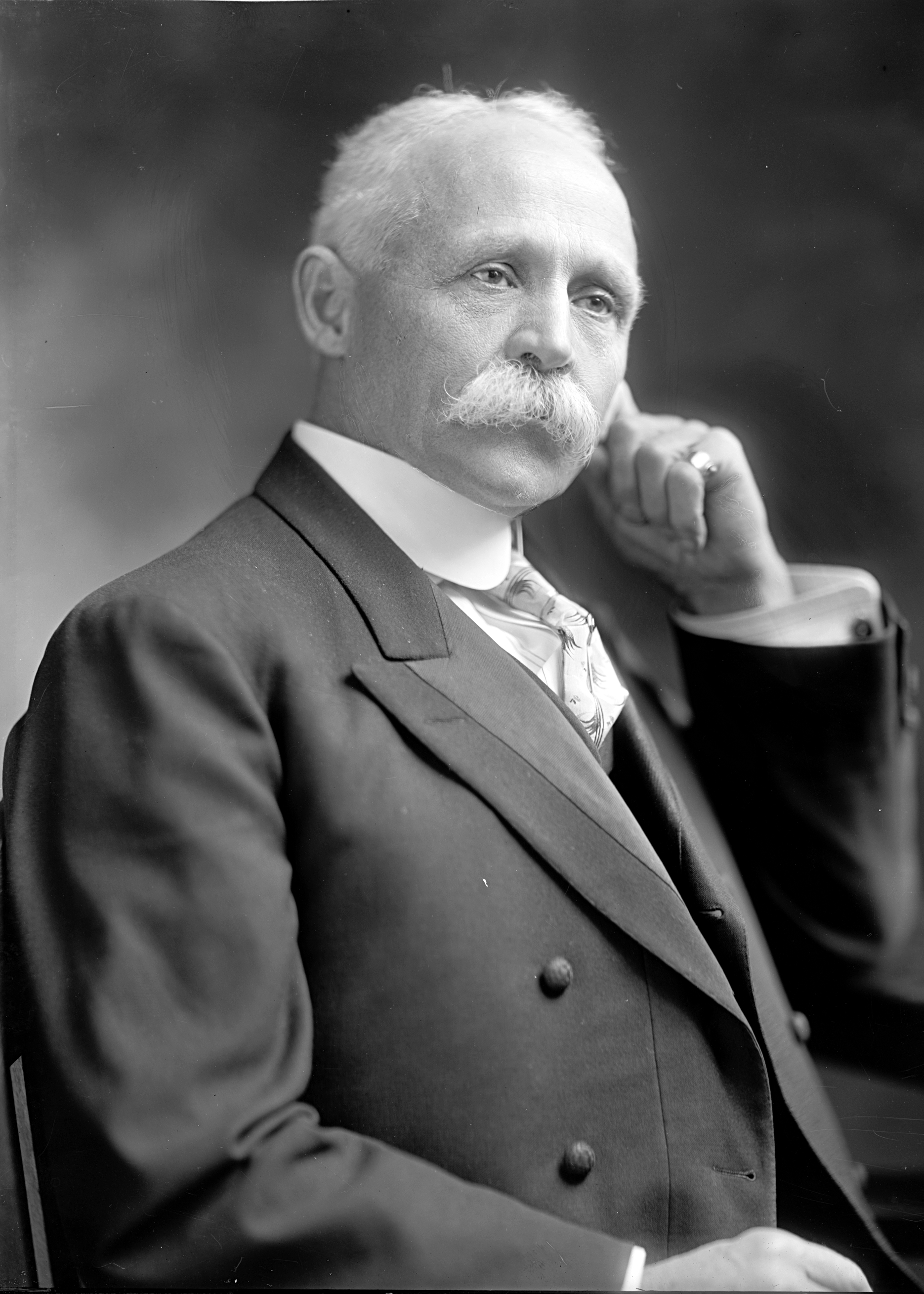
Charles Calvin Bowman: Served as acting mayor of Pittston (1896); served on Pittston's City Council for sixteen terms; served as a member of the U.S. House of Representatives from Pennsylvania's 11th district (1911–1912)

- George Banks, mass murderer
- Albert K. Bender, UFO writer
- Charles Calvin Bowman, mayor of Pittston and U.S. Representative from Pennsylvania
- James Joseph Brown, mining innovator
- Lou Butera, professional pool player
- Michael B. Carroll, PA state representative
- Jimmy Cefalo, Penn State football player, Miami Dolphins wide receiver, radio voice of the Miami Dolphins
- William D'Elia, mobster
- J. Harold Flannery, U.S. Representative from Pennsylvania
- Gene Guarilia, Boston Celtics
- James L. Hallock, Wisconsin state legislator
- Mike Hudock, professional football player
- Hughie Jennings, Major League Baseball player and manager
- Shawn Klush, Elvis tribute artist
- Marion Lorne, actress, was born in West Pittston.
- John D. MacArthur, businessman and philanthropist
- Tommy McMillan, Major League Baseball outfielder and shortstop
- Joseph Montione, radio personality
- Ray Musto, U.S. Representative from Pennsylvania
- Jay Parini, professor and author
- Thomas Tigue, Pennsylvania state legislator
- Charley Trippi, University of Georgia football player, 1943 Rose Bowl MVP, College Football Hall of Fame inductee, Chicago Cardinals quarterback and Pro Football Hall of Fame inductee. The football stadium at Pittston Area High School in Yatesville is named in his honor.

== Gallery ==
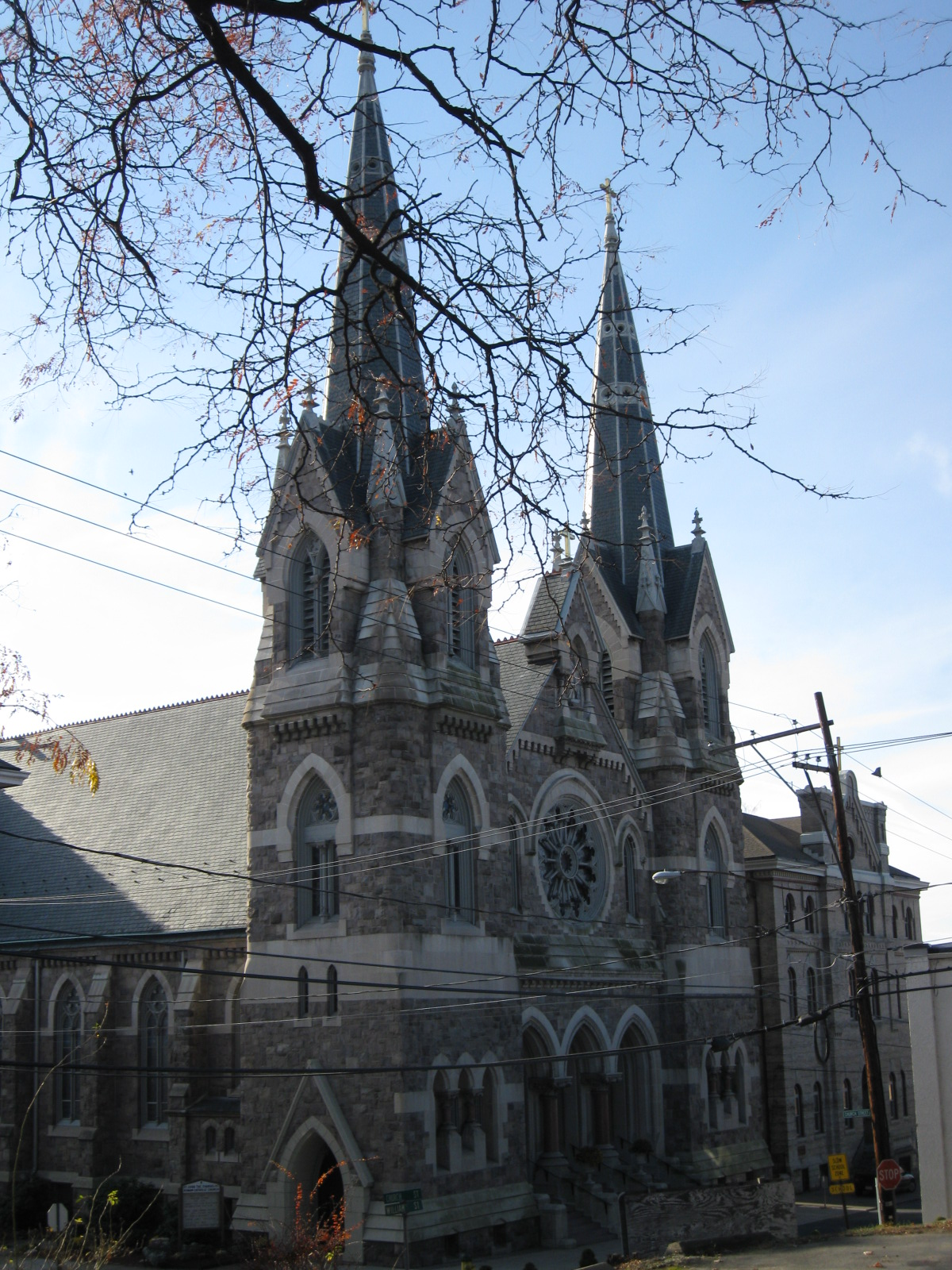
St. John the Evangelist Church in Pittston City

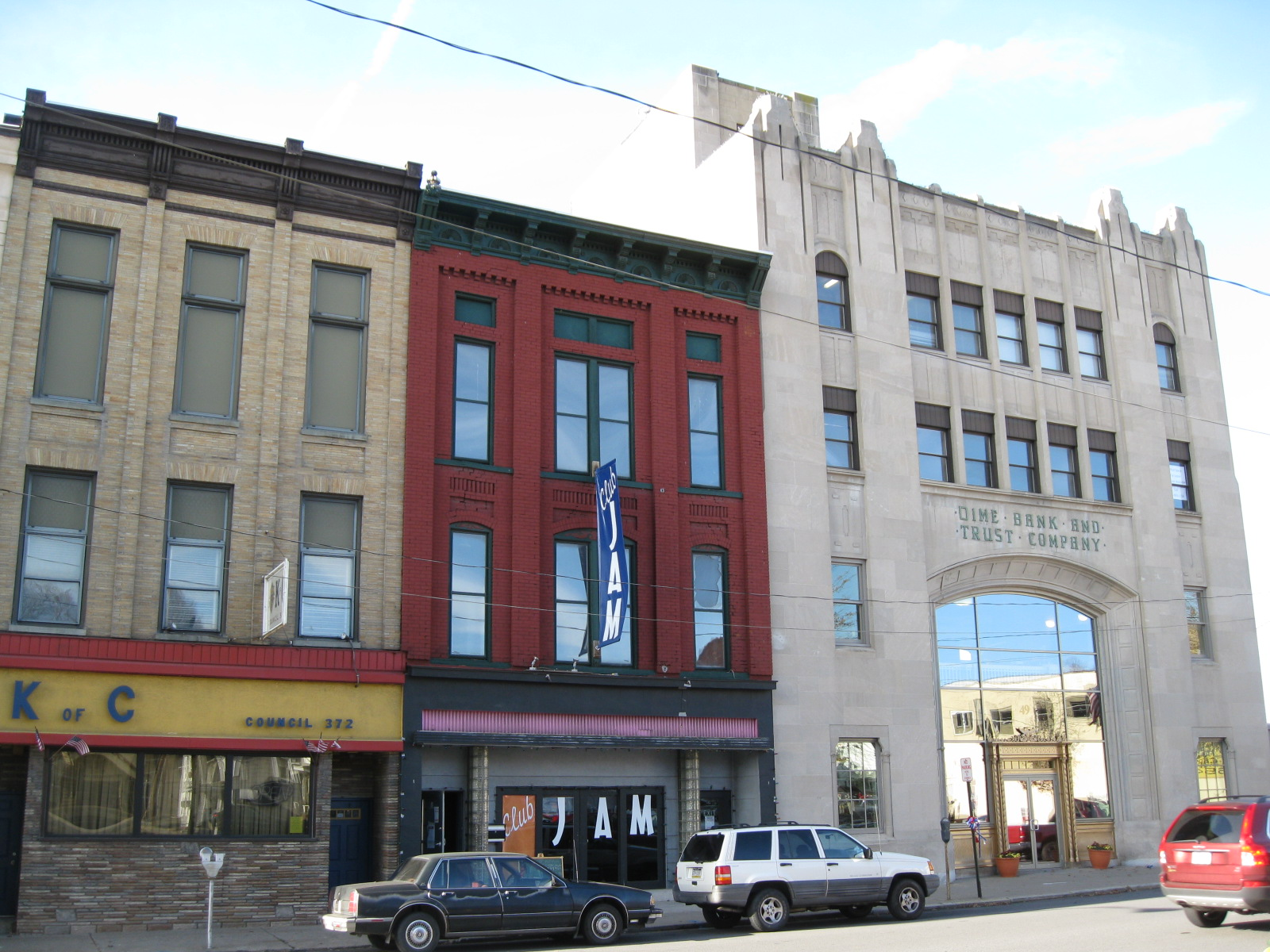
Pittston City's Downtown

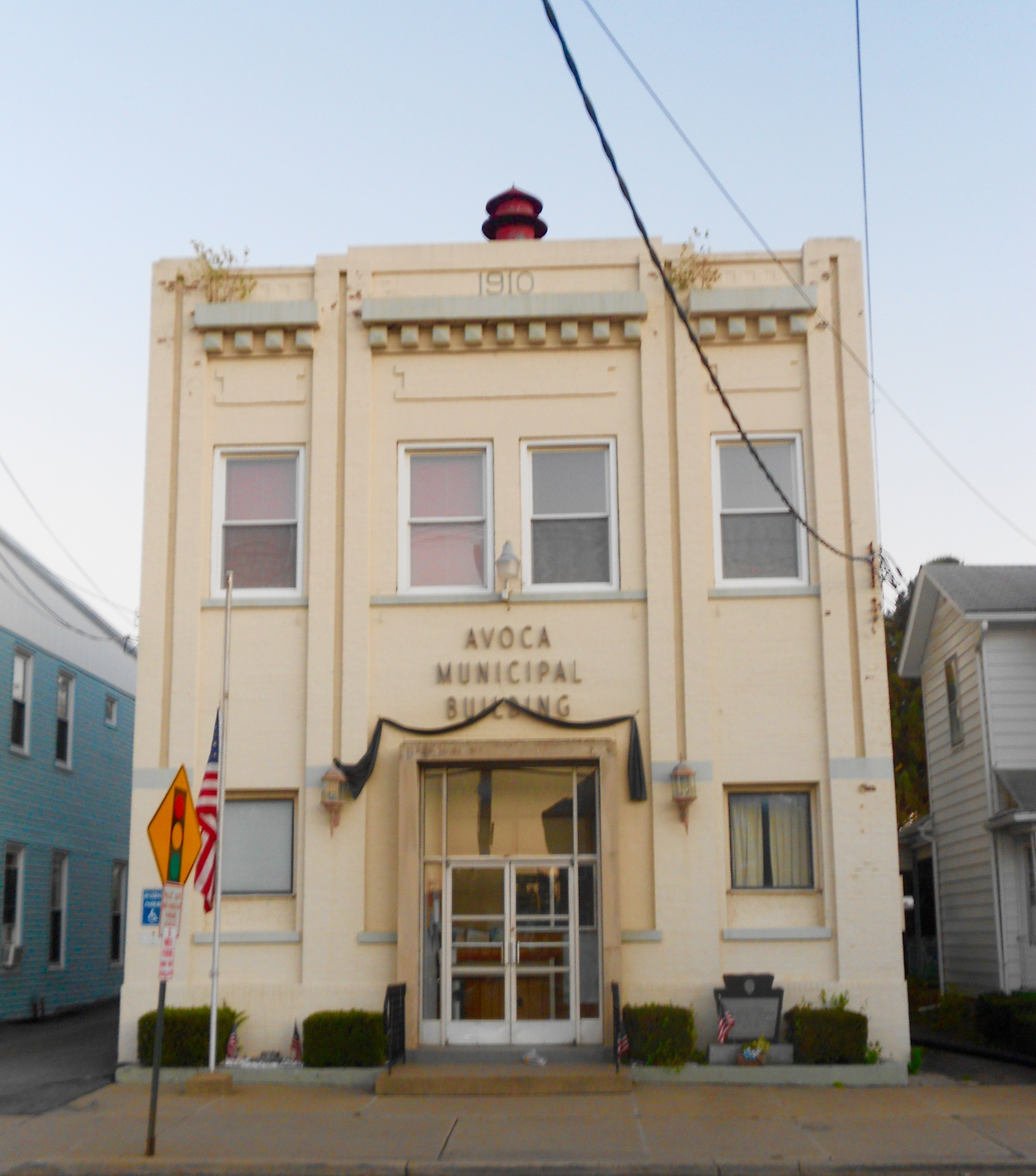
Avoca's 1910 Municipal Building

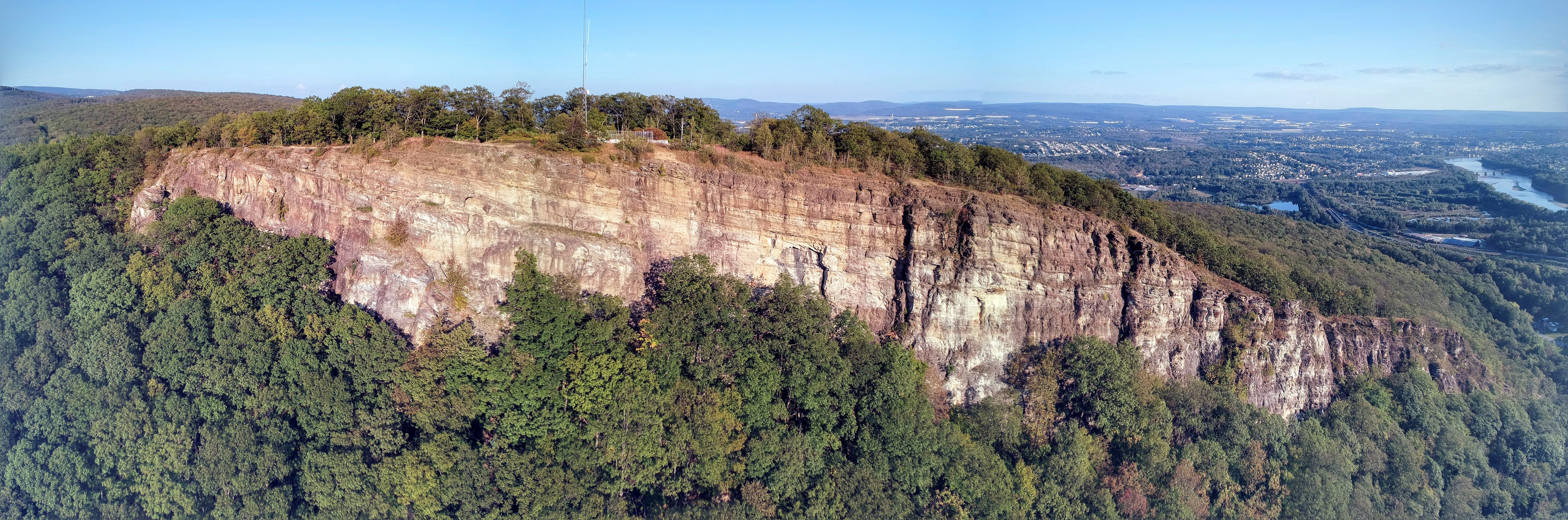
Campbell's Ledge in Duryea

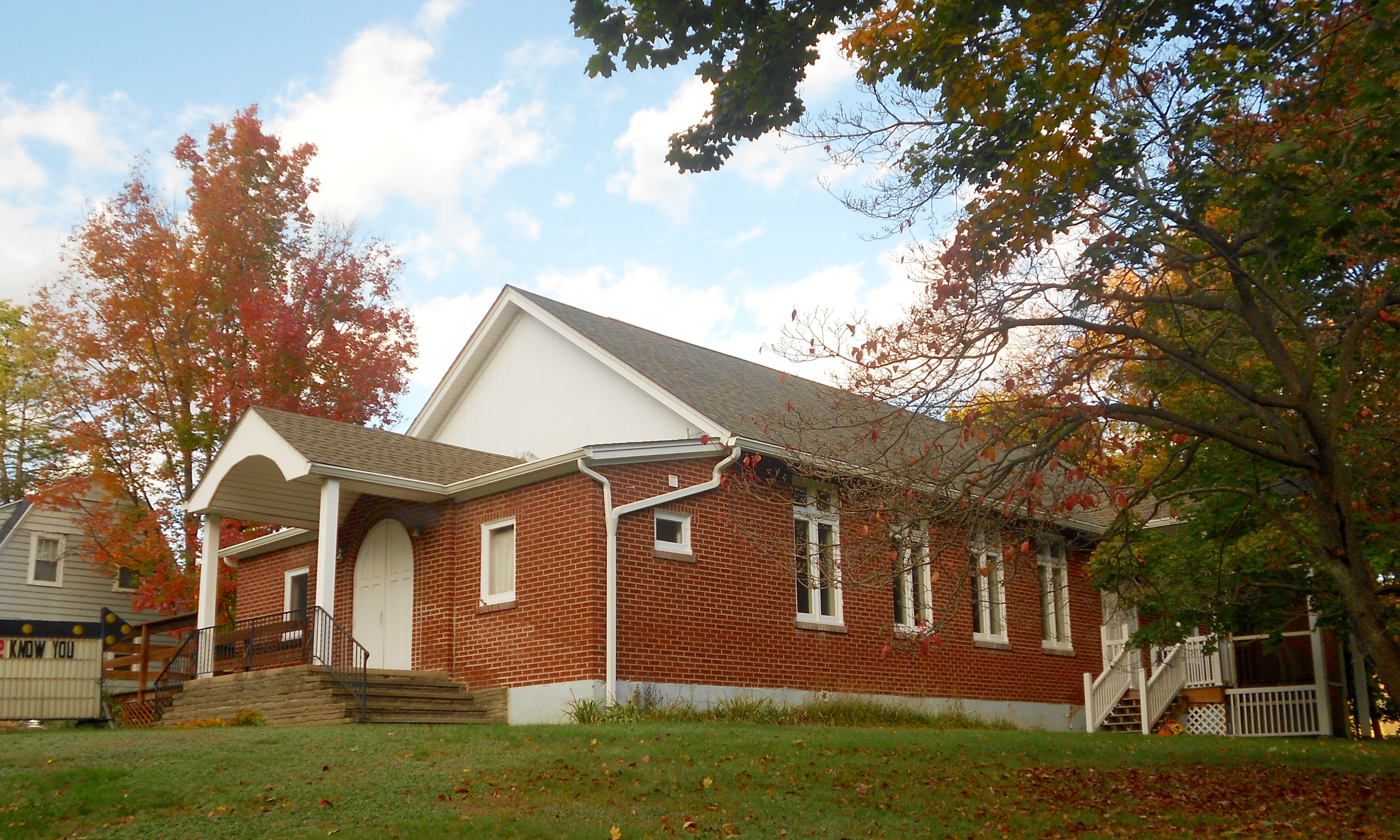
Harding Church of Christ in Exeter Township

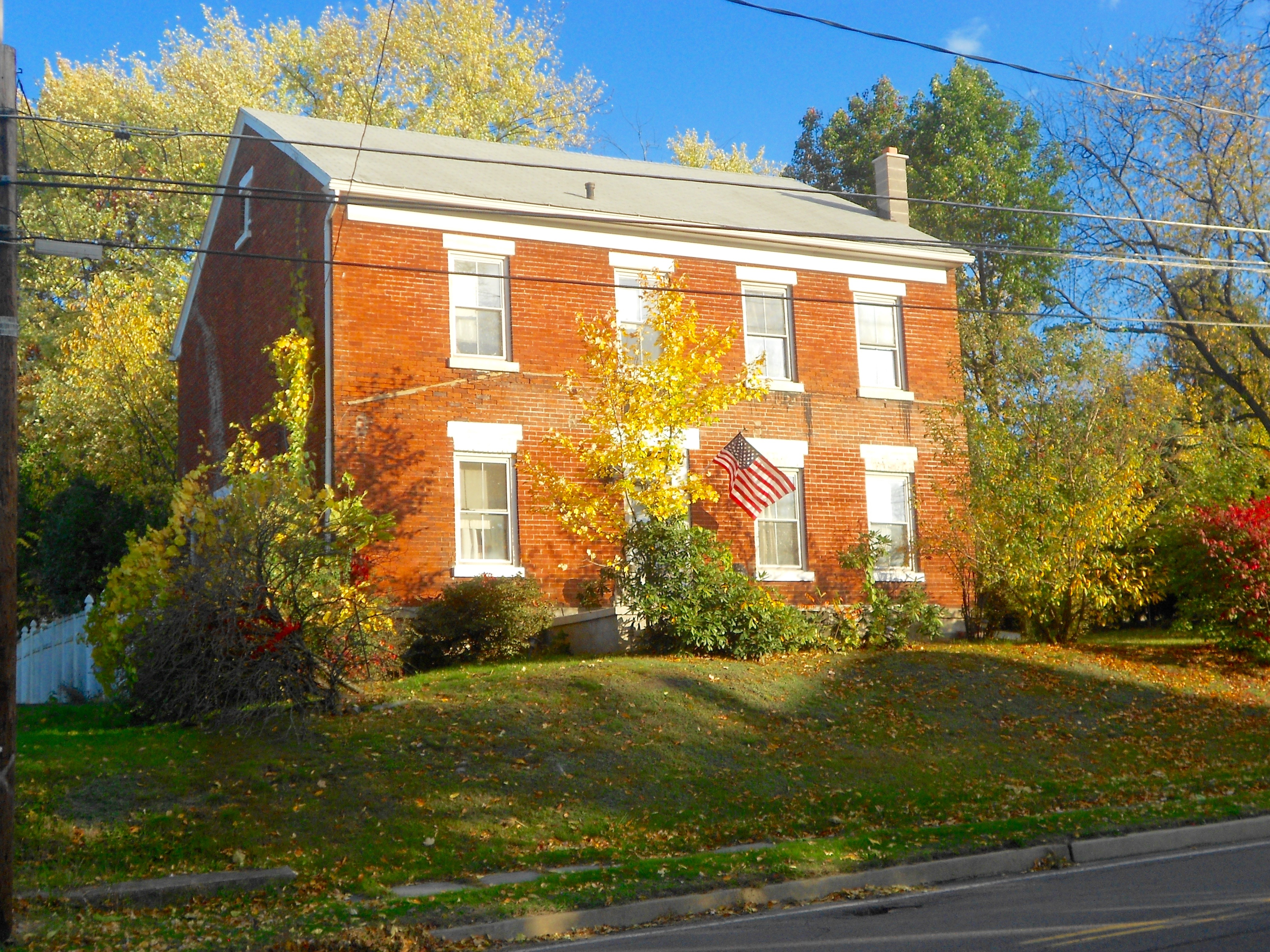
A home in Jenkins Township

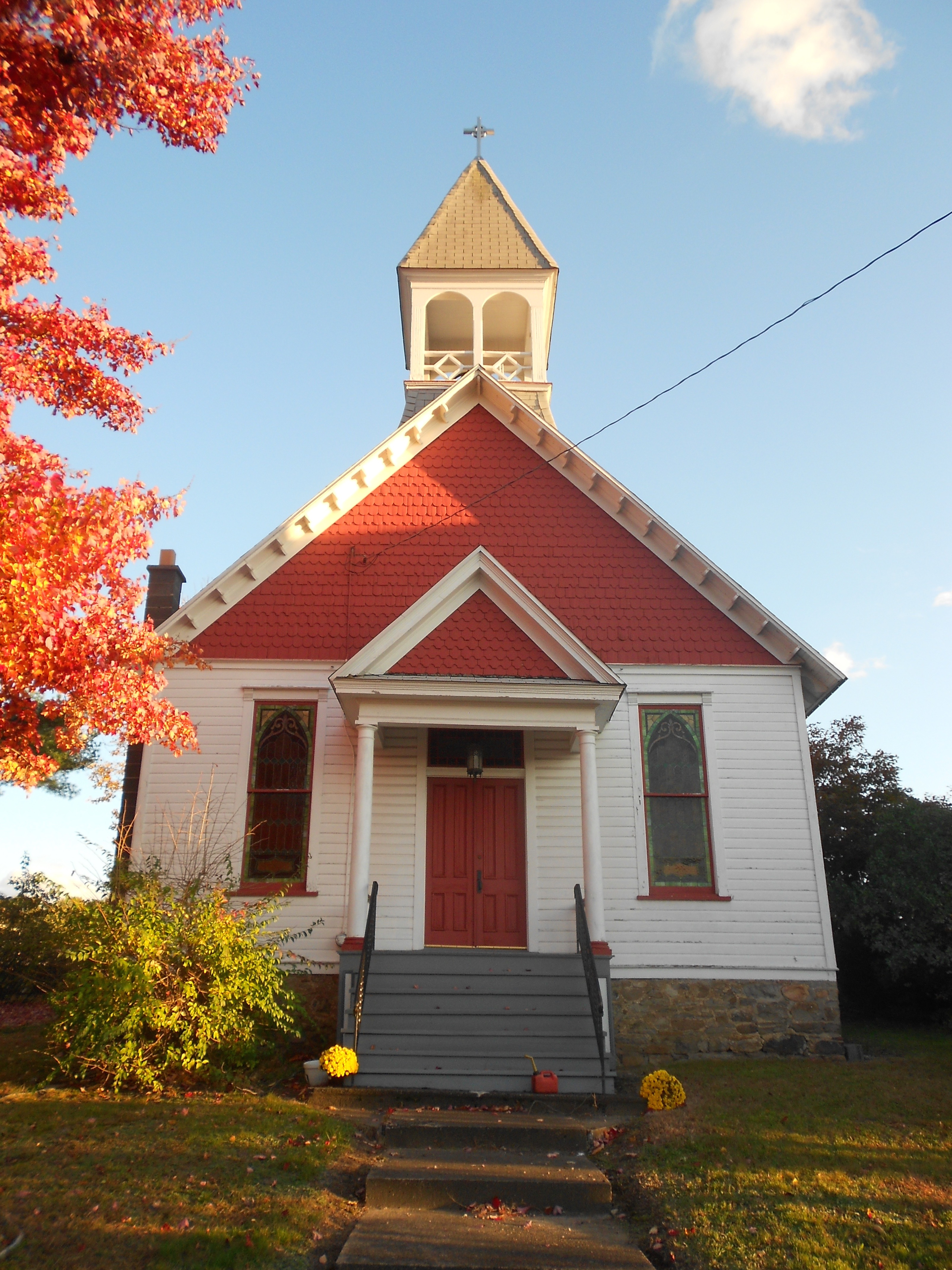
Church in Jenkins Township

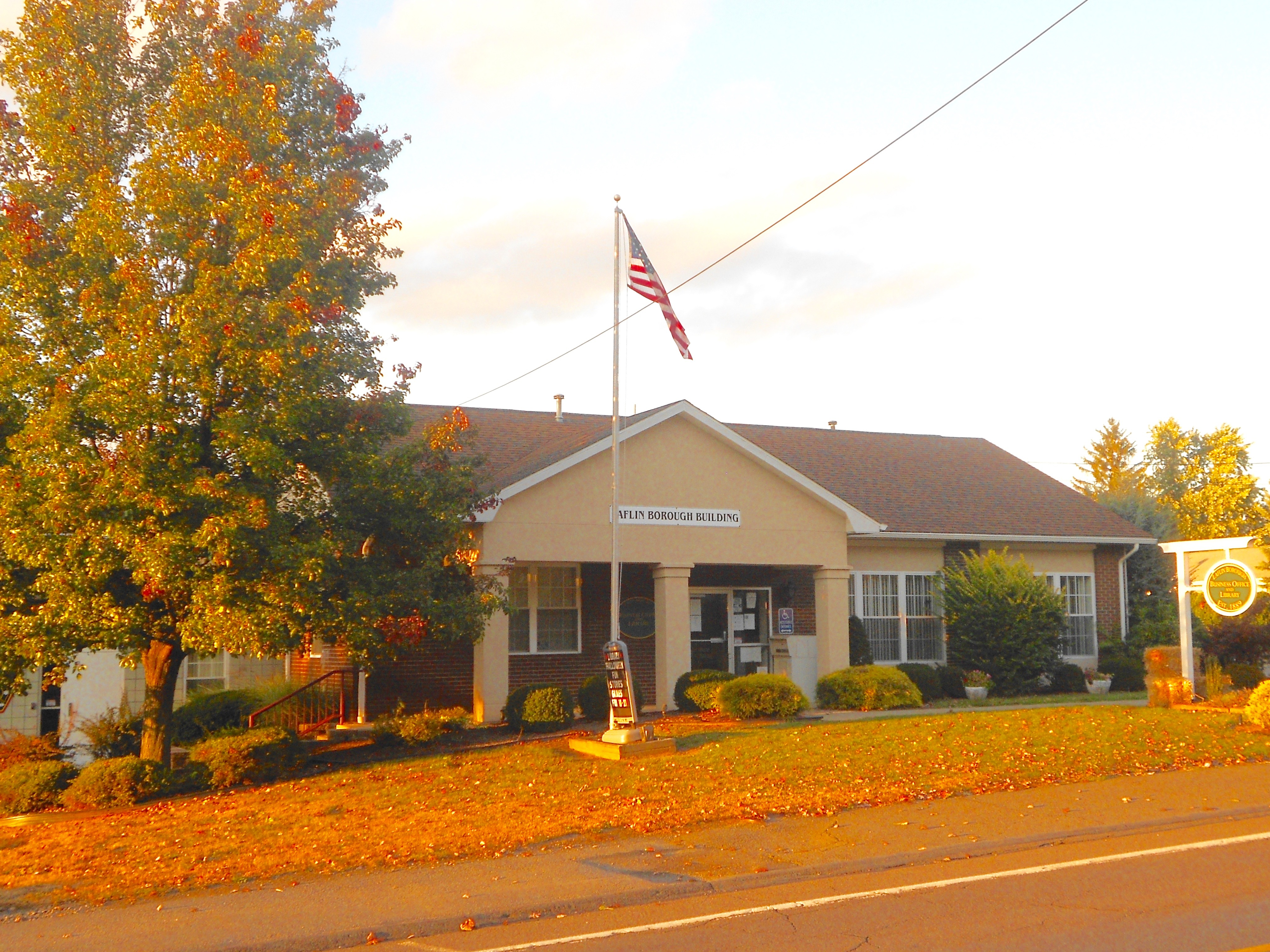
Laflin's Municipal Building

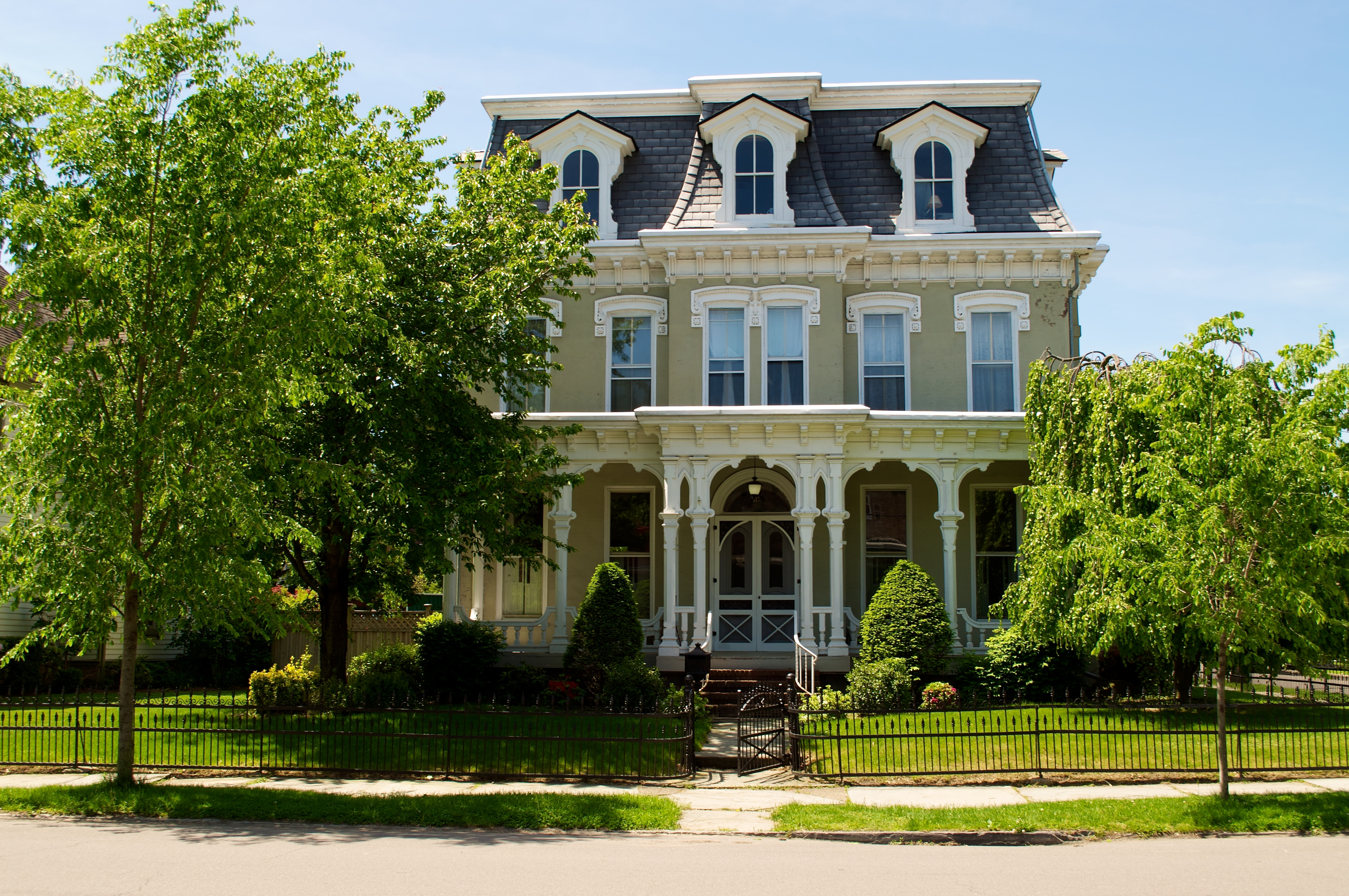
A home on Luzerne Avenue in West Pittston

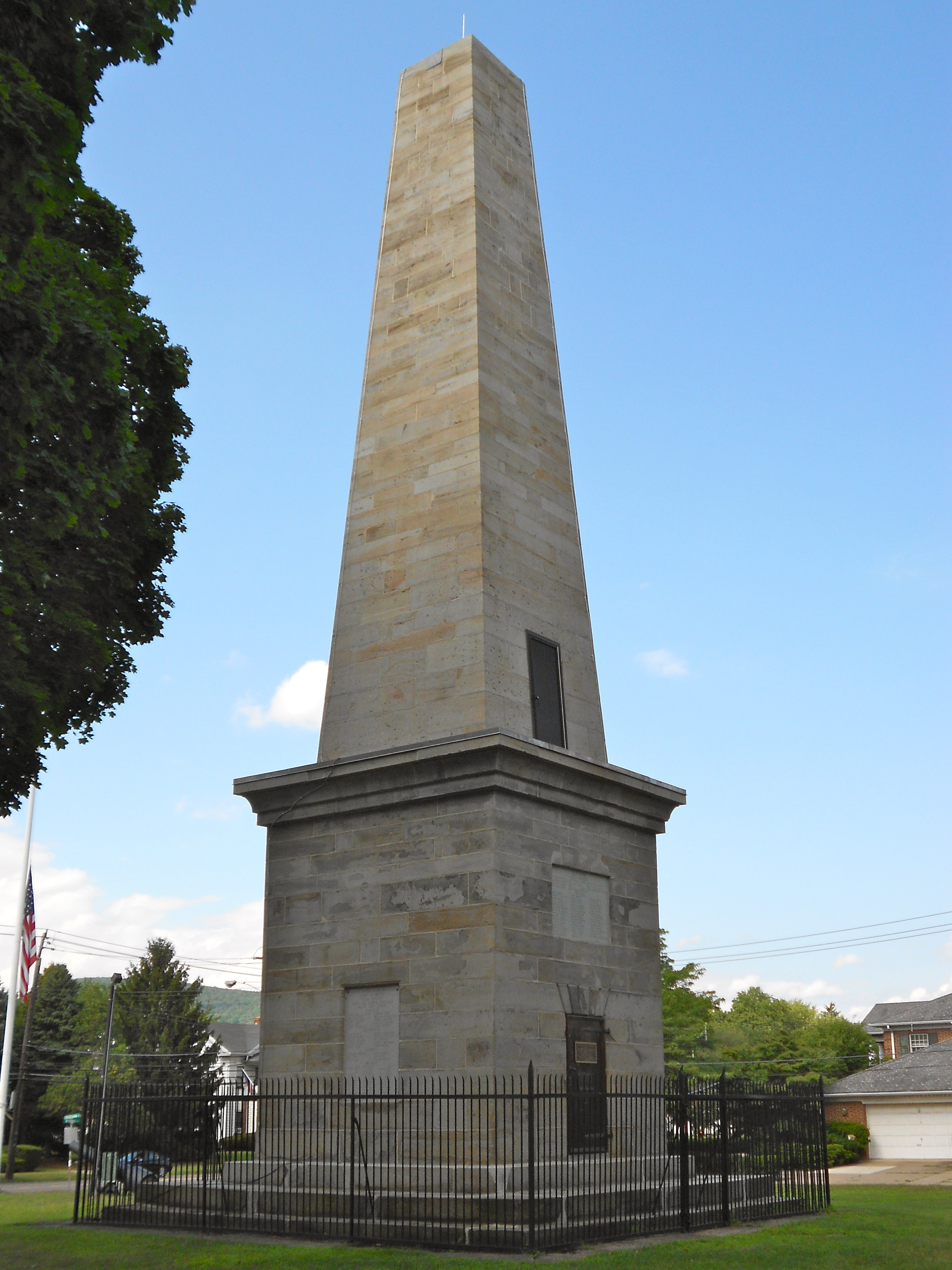
The Wyoming Monument

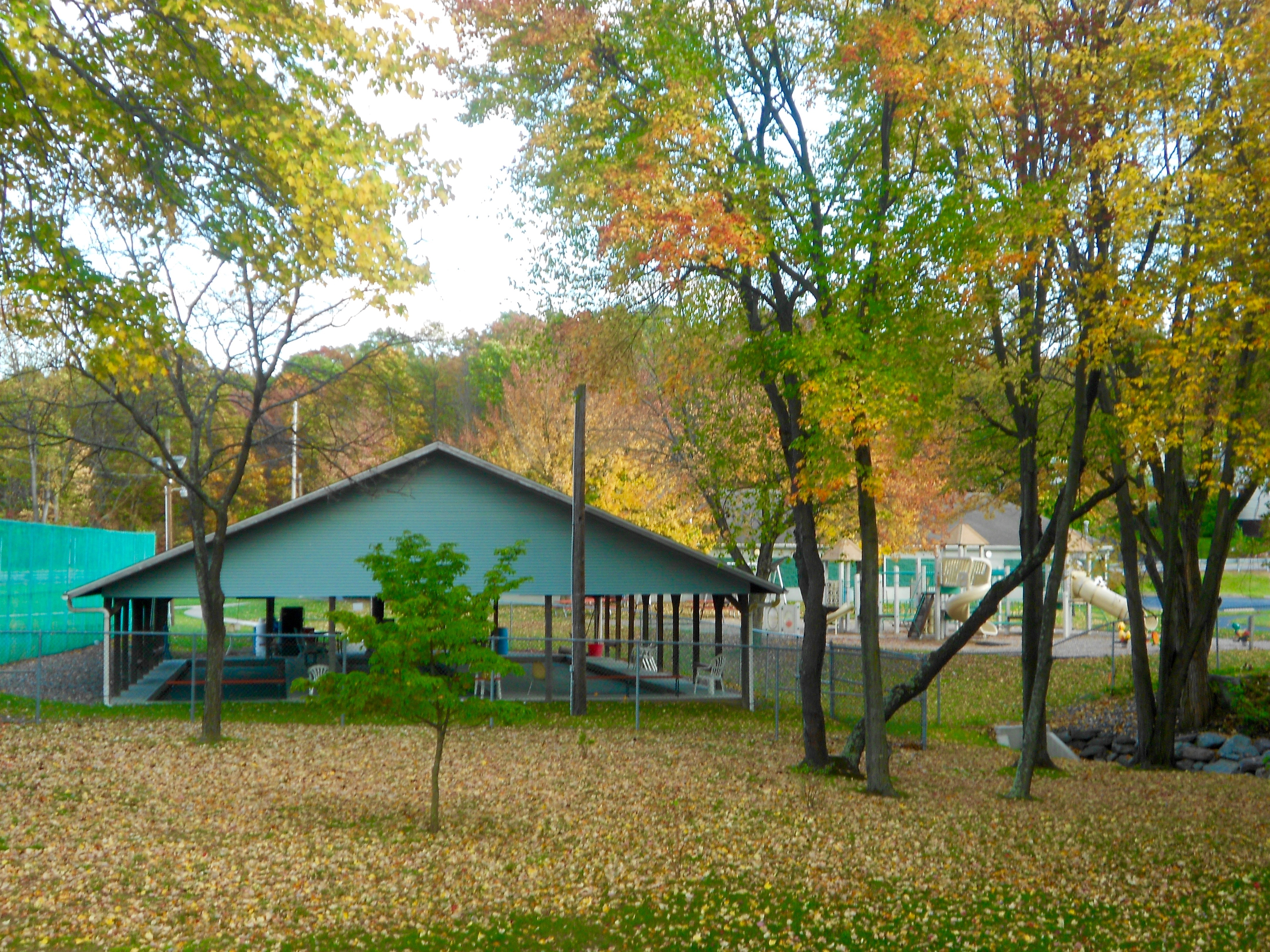
A park in Yatesville
