= Twin Shaft disaster =

1896 coal mine cave-in in Pittston, Pennsylvania, United States

Coordinates: 41°20′29.6″N 75°47′9.36″W

Hundreds gather at the site of the Twin Shaft disaster immediately after the cave-in (1896).

The Twin Shaft disaster occurred in the Newton Coal Company's Twin Shaft Colliery in Pittston, Pennsylvania, United States, on June 28, 1896, when a massive cave-in killed fifty-eight miners.

== Disaster ==
At 3:00 in the morning on Sunday, June 28, 1896, ninety miners were at work in the Red Ash Vein of the Newton Coal Company's Twin Shaft Mine in Pittston when the roof quickly caved in. It was believed at the time that all of the men perished.

The concussion from the explosion was so great that it was heard for miles around. The foundation of nearly every building in Pittston was shaken and windows and doors were rattled as in a tornado. In the houses nearer to the mine, persons were thrown from their beds, thinking an earthquake had occurred. Immediately after the boom, the colliery whistle and town fire alarms sounded. Families ran to the mine works. Newspapers reported "havoc everywhere," from grief-stricken wives to frantic efforts at impenetrable tunnels of collapsed top rock and crushed timbers.

Two rescue tunnels were attempted, though volunteers sometimes removed only 20 feet (6.1 m) a day. Hope faded for the victims of the disaster, most of whom were Irish and Lithuanian immigrants. Their names were compiled later because the list of those working was also underground.

There were 58 men and boys who died during the cave-in, buried 434 feet (132 m) below ground. In their wake, they left 31 widows and 101 orphans. None of their bodies were ever recovered. It was one of the largest coal mining disasters in Pennsylvania history (even larger than the Knox Mine disaster many decades later in nearby Port Griffith).

=== Aftermath ===
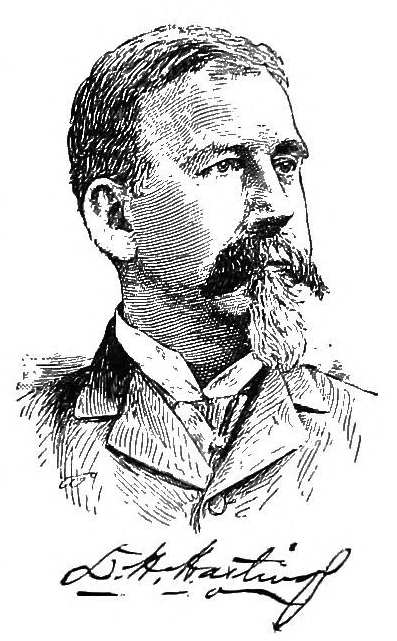
Governor Daniel H. Hastings ordered an inquiry into the cause of the mine disaster.

On July 10, 1896, testimony began in a formal investigation ordered by Pennsylvania's Governor Hastings to learn why the disaster happened, whether mining laws had been obeyed, and what might prevent future tragedies. Testimony revealed that there had been an audible "squeezing" of the pillars about two weeks prior to the accident — a sure sign that a wall or shaft was about to crumble. A miner named Edward Hughes defied his boss and left his shift early the night of the disaster because "the crackling grew worse." The superintendent ordered extra props put up to provide additional support. Apparently, however, these props were not placed strategically and once a section of the wall gave way, the others collapsed like a house of cards. In total, about 200 acres (81 ha) had caved in.

The investigating committee suggested that pillars of coal should be left standing for safety and not "robbed" of their coal, especially when two seams are mined at once, and that maps of mine workings and air tunnels be provided to mine inspectors. Rescue operations at Twin Shaft were slowed by the absence of such maps.

The Governor's investigative commission first issued its safety recommendations on September 25, 1896. These recommendations would often be ignored in subsequent years.

The disaster played a major role after 1900 in the stronger unionization of Northeastern Pennsylvania under the leadership of John Mitchell.

Today a marker stands in the area where the event occurred.

== See also ==
- Avondale Mine disaster
