= Old Boston =

Old Boston may refer to:

- Old Boston, Pennsylvania, US
- Old Boston, Texas, US
- Old Boston Colliery, a disused colliery in Haydock, St Helens, England
