= Jenkins Township, Pennsylvania =

Township in Pennsylvania, US

Coordinates: 41°17′00″N 75°44′29″W

- Township
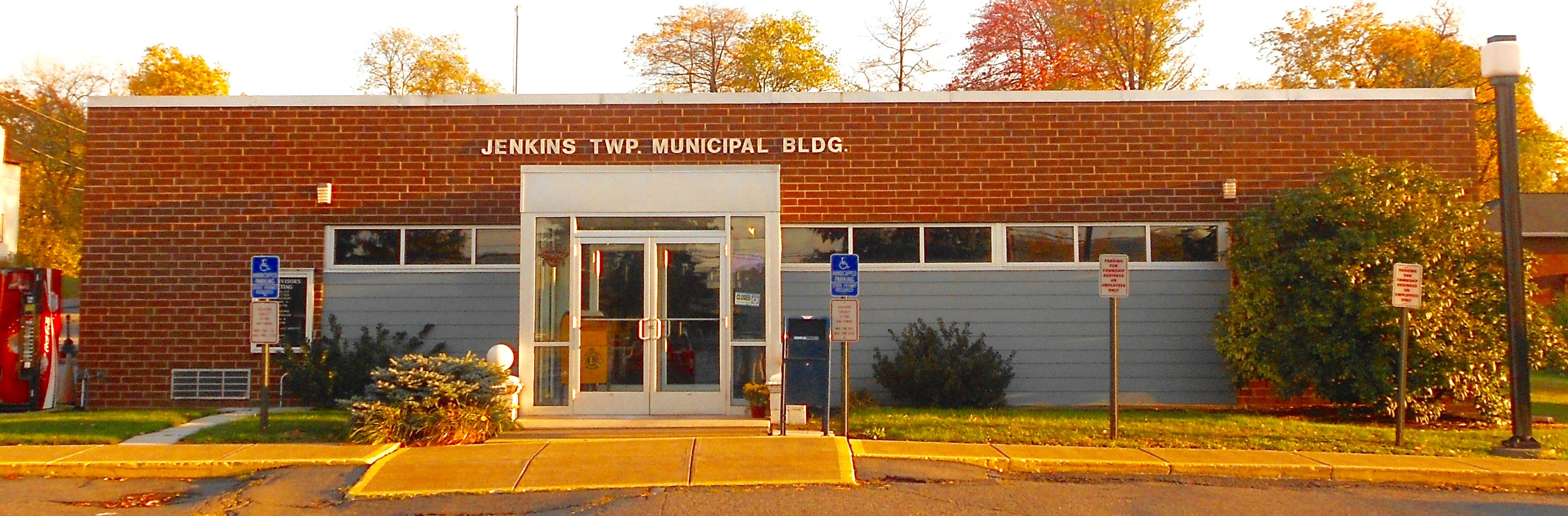
- Municipal Building in Inkerman

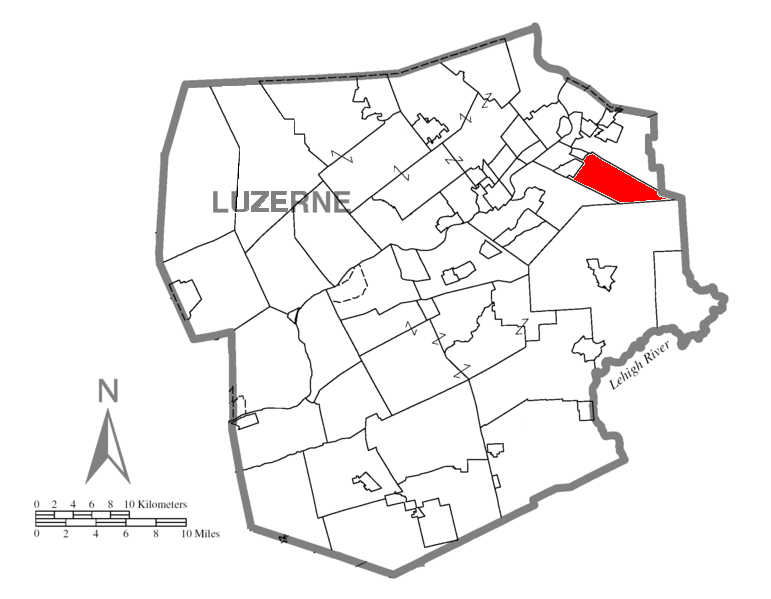
- Map of Pennsylvania highlighting Luzerne County

- Map of Pennsylvania highlighting Luzerne County
- Country: United States
- State: Pennsylvania
- County: Luzerne
- Region: Greater Pittston
- Incorporated: June 24, 1852

Area
  - Total: 13.98 sq mi (36.21 km^{2})
  - Land: 13.70 sq mi (35.47 km^{2})
  - Water: 0.29 sq mi (0.75 km^{2})

Population (2020)
  - Total: 4,282 ▼
  - Estimate (2021): 4,337
  - Density: 324.7/sq mi (125.35/km^{2})
- Time zone: UTC-5 (Eastern (EST))
  - Summer (DST): UTC-4 (EDT)
- FIPS code: 42-079-37984
- Website: jenkinstownship.net

Jenkins Township is a township in the Greater Pittston area of Luzerne County, Pennsylvania, United States. The population was 4,282 at the 2020 census.

== History ==
=== Settlement ===
Isaac Gould and Joseph Gardner were the first permanent settlers in modern-day Jenkins Township. The first important settlement in the territory was Joseph Gardner's gristmill in 1794 (on Gardner's Creek). The first schoolhouse was built in the early 1810s. Jenkins Township was formed from a section of Pittston Township on June 24, 1852. It was named after Col. John Jenkins (who settled the area with his family in 1769). He served as an officer in the American Revolution (1775-1782), and as a Representative of Luzerne County in the Pennsylvania Legislature (elected in 1797).

=== Coal mining ===
Logging and farming were the first major employers in the region, but due to the abundance of anthracite coal under the township, the coal mining industry quickly expanded. Port Griffith was named in honor of one of the original stockholders of the Pennsylvania Coal Company. Other villages in the township (e.g., Port Blanchard, Inkerman, and Sebastopol) also played an important role in the mining industry. On January 22, 1959, the Knox Mine Disaster in Port Griffith, Jenkins Township, claimed the lives of 12 people and essentially shut down the mining industry in Northeastern Pennsylvania.

=== Train disaster ===
On July 3, 1920, three trains collided on the Lackawanna and Wyoming Valley Railroad, known as the Laurel Line, in the village of Sebastopol in Jenkins Township. Eighteen people were killed and thirty more were injured.

“Almost all persons killed in the wreck were passengers in the Limited coach into which the first car of the local train plunged, crashing its way to its full length through the Limited coach, completely telescoping it,” reported the Wilkes-Barre Record on July 5, 1920.

=== Contemporary history ===
The coal companies left behind a scarred landscape (e.g., culm banks) when they pulled out of the region. Today, Jenkins Township's economy is composed of an expanding warehousing industry.

On September 25, 1982, George Banks killed thirteen people in a shooting rampage in Jenkins Township and Wilkes-Barre City.

== Geography ==
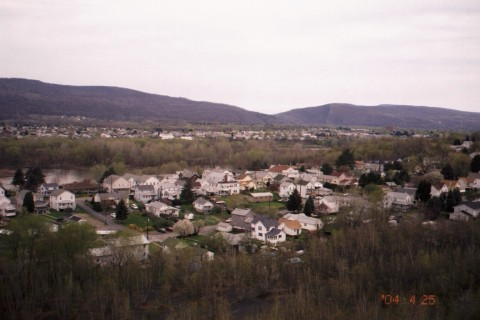
Port Griffith, Jenkins Township

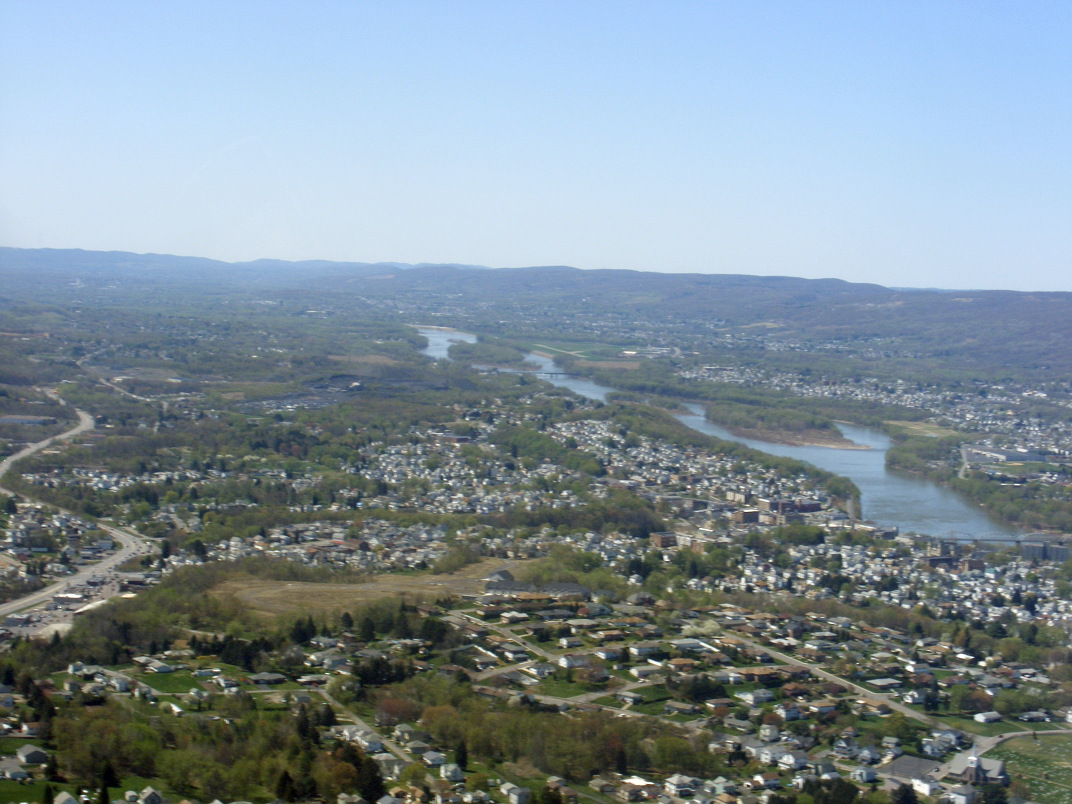
An aerial view of Greater Pittston; Jenkins Township is visible near the middle (left of the Susquehanna River).

According to the United States Census Bureau, the township has a total area of 14.0 square miles (36.2 km^{2}), of which 13.7 square miles (35.5 km^{2}) is land and 0.27 square miles (0.7 km^{2}), or 2.06%, is water. The township is served by the Pittston Area School District. It is drained by the Susquehanna River, which separates it from Wyoming and Exeter. The Eighth Street Bridge links Jenkins Township to Wyoming. The township's villages include Ewen, Inkerman, Old Boston, Port Blanchard, Port Griffith, Sebastopol, and Westminster.

Jenkins Township can be divided into two separate regions (connected by a small strip of land). The northwestern portion of the township borders the Susquehanna River; it is mostly made up of homes and businesses. There is a small strip of land connecting the northwestern portion of the township to the southeastern region of the township. This small strip is less than a quarter of a mile wide and is flanked by the Borough of Yatesville (to the north) and the Borough of Laflin (to the south). The southeastern region of Jenkins is the largest by total area. I-81, I-476, and PA 315 travel through this section of the municipality; there are a few neighborhoods and warehouses located near these highways. Thick forests make up the very southeastern section of the township.

=== Neighboring municipalities ===
- Bear Creek Township (south)
- Plains Township (southwest)
- Laflin (southwest)
- Wyoming (west)
- Exeter (northwest)
- Pittston (north)
- Yatesville (northeast)
- Pittston Township (northeast)
- Spring Brook Township, Lackawanna County (east)
- Thornhurst Township, Lackawanna County (southeast)

== Demographics ==
Historical population
| Census | Pop. | Note | %± |
|---|---|---|---|
| 2000 | 4,584 | | — |
| 2010 | 4,442 | | −3.1% |
| 2020 | 4,282 | | −3.6% |
| 2021 (est.) | 4,337 | | 1.3% |
U.S. Decennial Census

As of the census of 2000, there were 4,584 people, 1,715 households, and 1,166 families residing in the township. The population density was 337.4 inhabitants per square mile (130.3/km^{2}). There were 1,843 housing units at an average density of 135.7 per square mile (52.4/km^{2}). The racial makeup of the township was 98.97% White, 0.26% African American, 0.07% Native American, 0.15% Asian, 0.02% Pacific Islander, 0.07% from other races, and 0.46% from two or more races. Hispanic or Latino of any race were 0.50% of the population.

There were 1,715 households, out of which 27.6% had children under the age of 18 living with them, 51.9% were married couples living together, 10.1% had a female householder with no husband present, and 32.0% were non-families. 28.6% of all households were made up of individuals, and 15.9% had someone living alone who was 65 years of age or older. The average household size was 2.48 and the average family size was 3.06.

In the township the population was spread out, with 20.0% under the age of 18, 6.7% from 18 to 24, 25.6% from 25 to 44, 24.1% from 45 to 64, and 23.6% who were 65 years of age or older. The median age was 44 years. For every 100 females, there were 83.4 males. For every 100 females age 18 and over, there were 79.4 males.

The median income for a household in the township was $39,103, and the median income for a family was $46,673. Males had a median income of $36,212 versus $23,534 for females. The per capita income for the township was $19,693. About 5.7% of families and 7.2% of the population were below the poverty line, including 11.7% of those under age 18 and 5.2% of those age 65 or over.

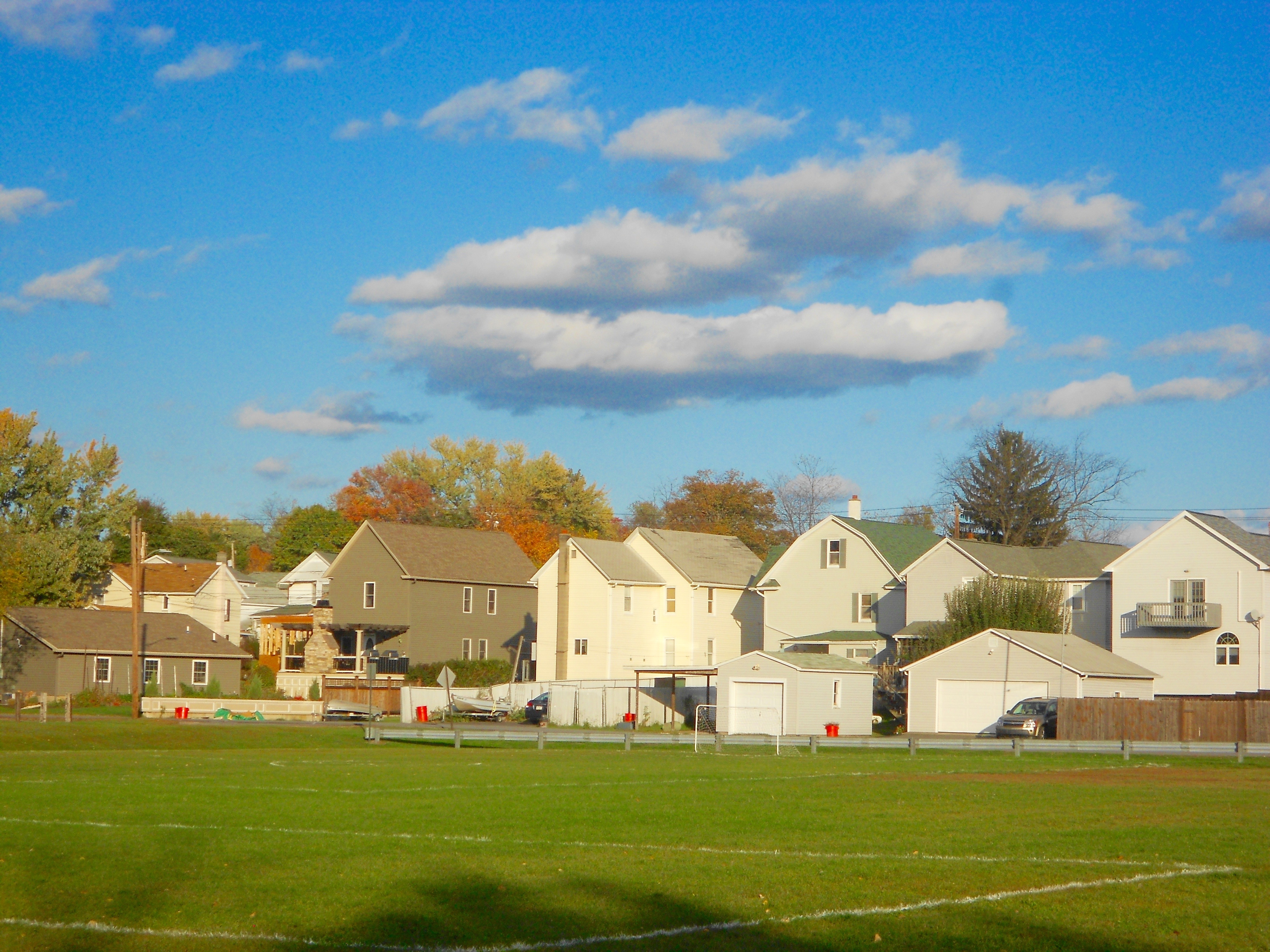
Soccer field in Jenkins Township

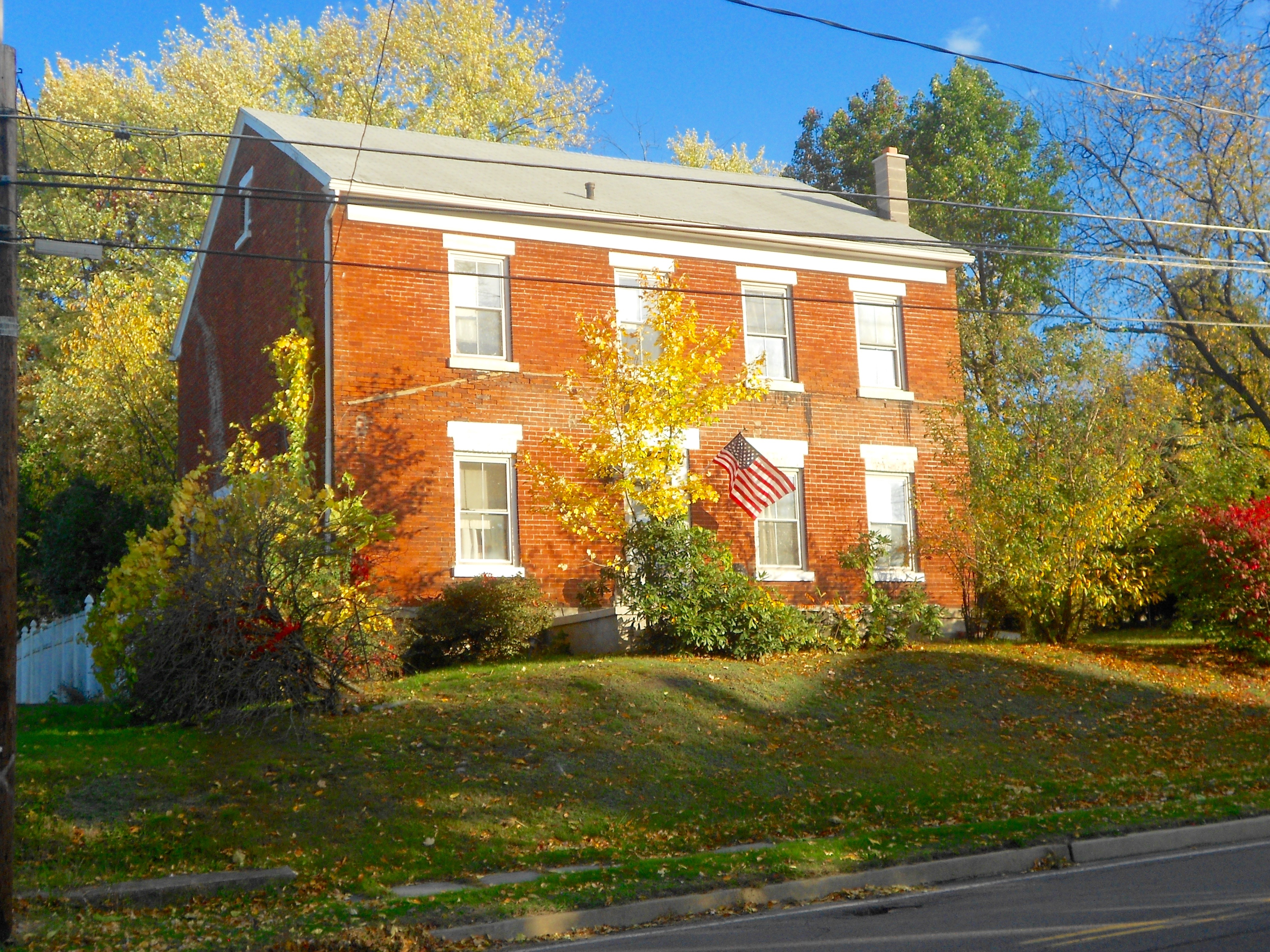
A house near the soccer field

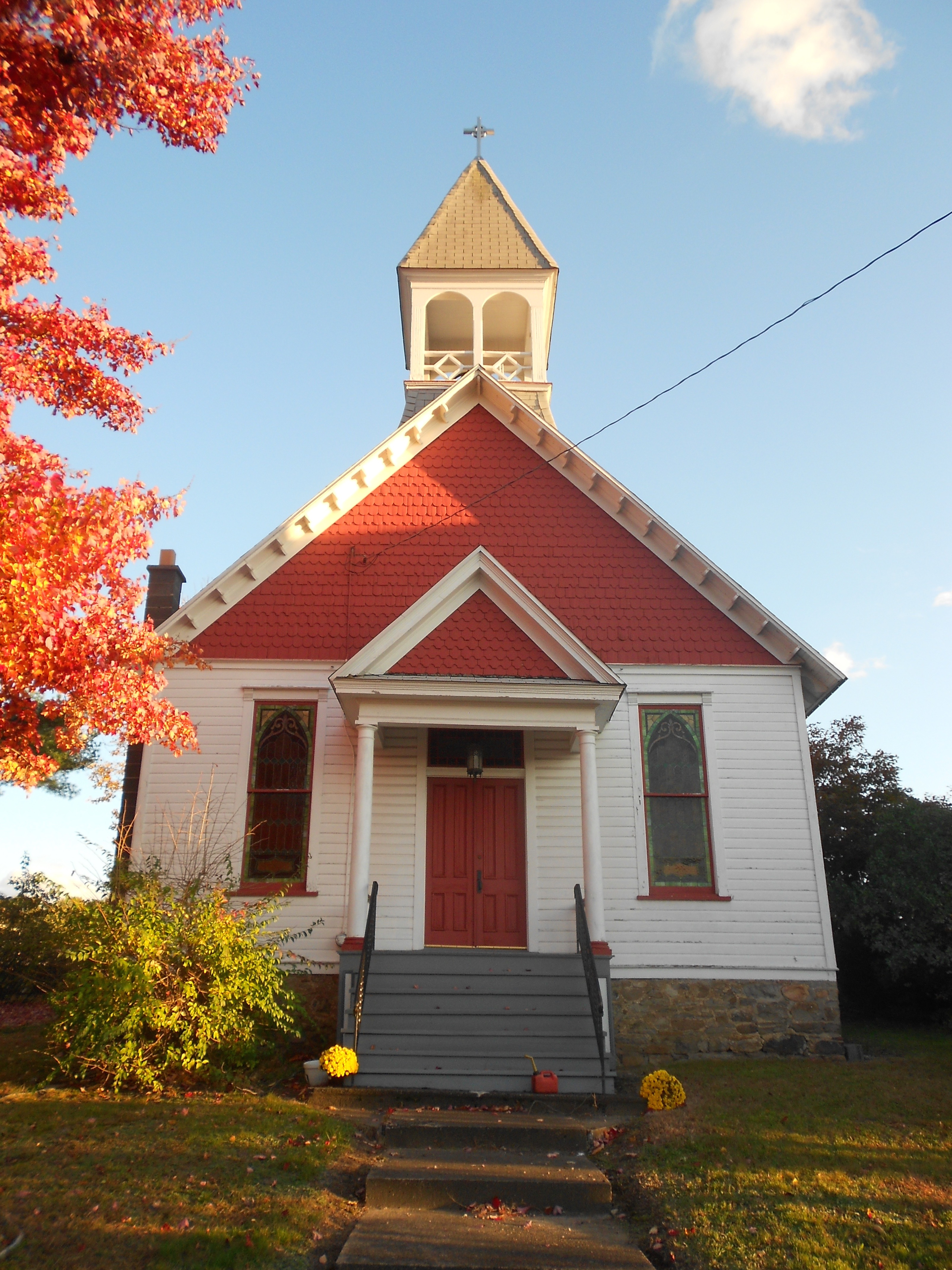
Inkerman Presbyterian Church
