= Inkerman, Pennsylvania =

Unincorporated community in Pennsylvania, US

- Census-designated place
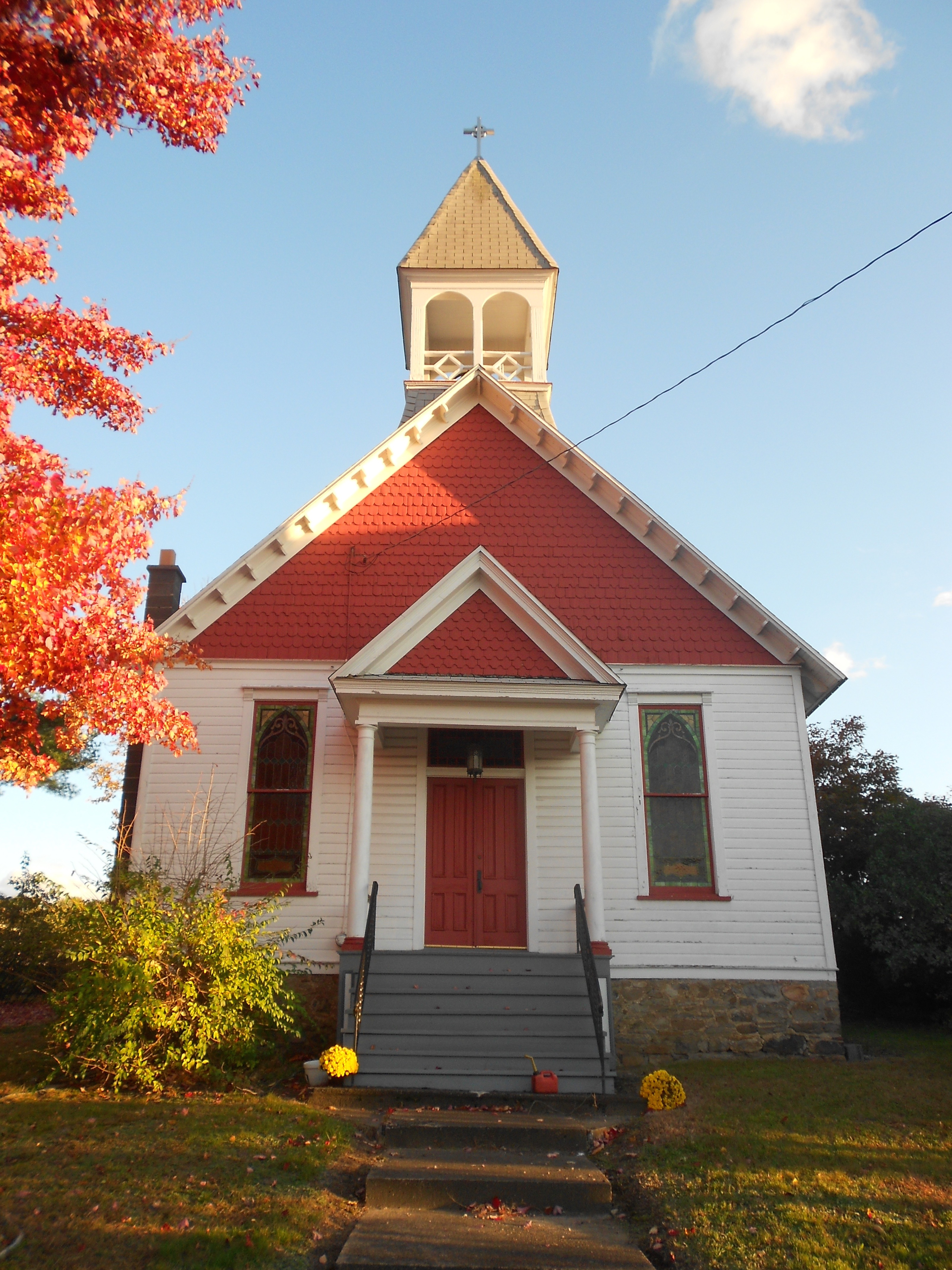
- Inkerman Presbyterian Church

- Location in Pennsylvania Location in the United States
- Coordinates: 41°17′56″N 75°48′45″W
- Country: United States
- State: Pennsylvania
- County: Luzerne
- Township: Jenkins

Area
  - Total: 0.73 sq mi (1.89 km^{2})
  - Land: 0.73 sq mi (1.89 km^{2})
  - Water: 0 sq mi (0.00 km^{2})

Population (2020)
  - Total: 1,720
  - Density: 2,353.7/sq mi (908.76/km^{2})
- Time zone: UTC-5 (Eastern (EST))
  - Summer (DST): UTC-4 (EDT)
- ZIP code: 18640
- Area code: 570
- FIPS code: 42-37008

Inkerman is a census-designated place (CDP) in Jenkins Township, Luzerne County, Pennsylvania, United States. The population was 1,819 at the 2010 census.

== Geography ==
Inkerman is located at 41°17′56″N 75°48′45″W. The elevation is 791 feet (241 m) above sea level.

According to the United States Census Bureau, the CDP has a total area of 0.73 square miles (1.9 km^{2}), all land. It is located in the western portion of Jenkins Township. The CDP is situated northeast of Plains Township, northwest of Laflin, south of Pittston, and southeast of the Susquehanna River.

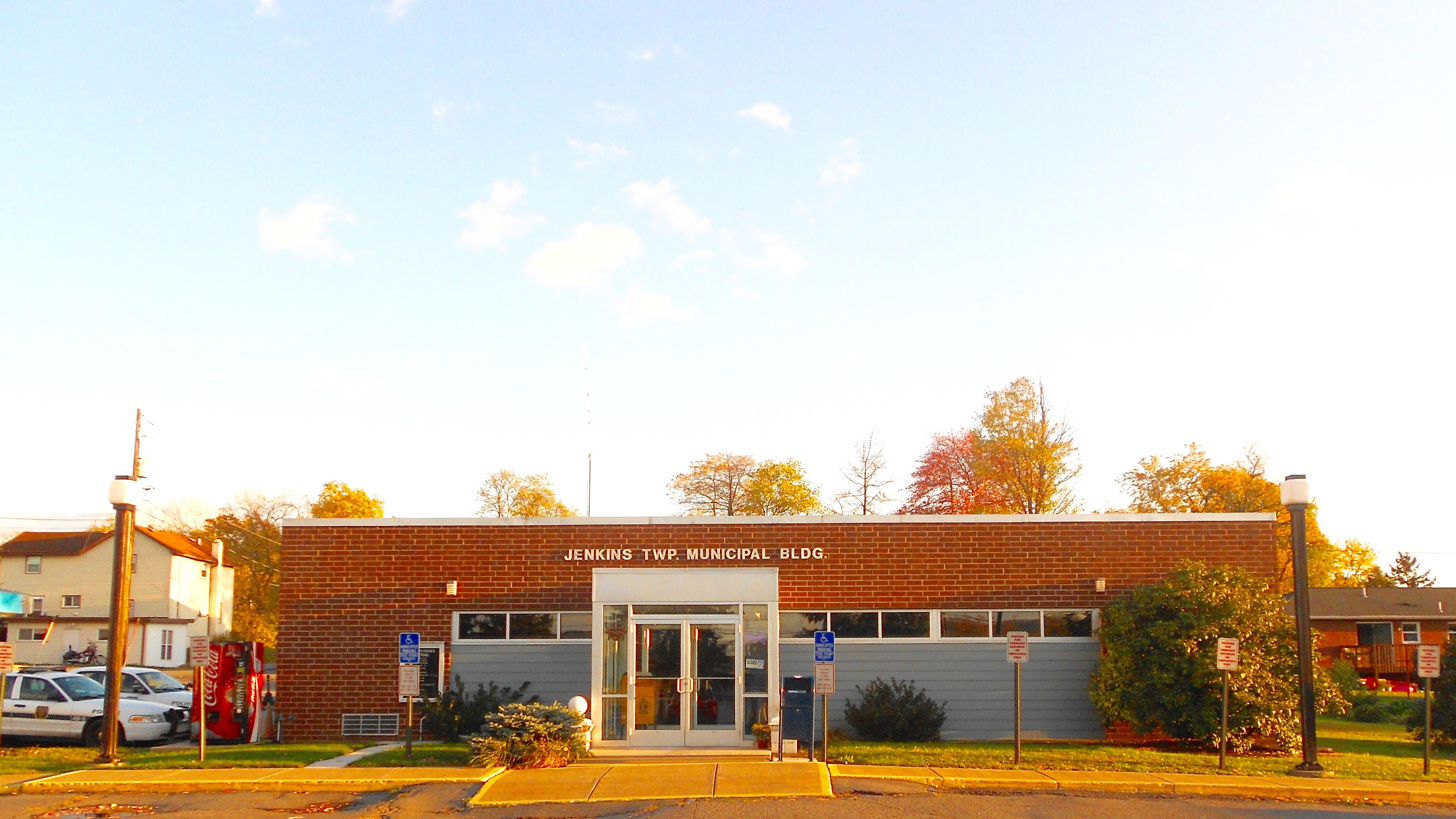
Jenkins Township Municipal Building, located in Inkerman

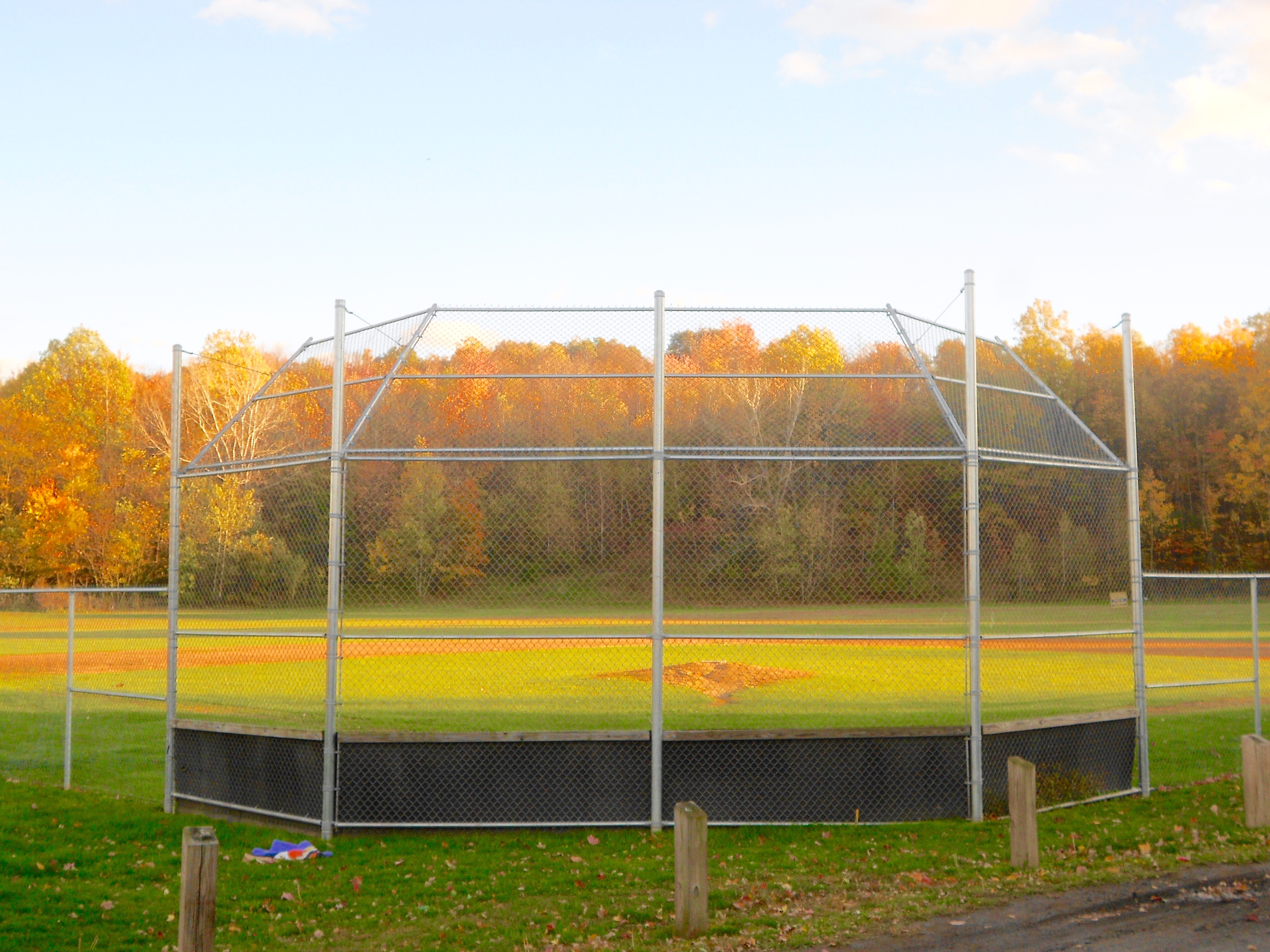
Baseball backstop

== Demographics ==
Historical population
Census	Pop.	Note	%±
2020	1,720		—
U.S. Decennial Census

== Education ==
It is in the Pittston Area School District.
