= 1982 Wilkes-Barre shootings =

Spree shooting in Pennsylvania, U.S.

- Location: Wilkes-Barre and Jenkins Township, Pennsylvania, U.S.
- Date: September 25, 1982; 44 years ago
- Attack type: Mass shooting; spree shooting; mass murder; familicide
- Weapon: Colt AR-15 SP1 semi-automatic rifle
- Deaths: 13
- Injuries: 1
- Perpetrator: George Emil Banks
- Motive: Mental illness, delusions of imminent Race war
- Verdict: Guilty on all counts
- Convictions: First-degree murder (12 counts); Third-degree murder Attempted murder
- Sentence: Death

The 1982 Wilkes-Barre shootings was a spree shooting which occurred in the United States on September 25, 1982, carried out by George Emil Banks, a former Camp Hill prison guard. Banks fatally shot 13 people in Wilkes-Barre and Jenkins Township, Pennsylvania. The victims included seven children – five being his own – their mothers, their relatives, and one bystander.

Banks' attorneys argued for the insanity defense, but following a trial, Banks was convicted of 12 counts of first-degree murder and sentenced to death.

On November 29, 1990, the Pennsylvania State Legislature barred further use of the electric chair amid debate that electrocution was cruel and unusual punishment; it approved execution by lethal injection. Banks's case was appealed and, on December 2, 2004, he received a stay of execution following a determination that he was incompetent for execution. On May 12, 2010, Banks was declared incompetent to be executed, following a competency hearing held the previous month. On November 2, 2025, Banks died in prison at the age of 83.

The shooting remains the deadliest in the history of Pennsylvania.

== Shootings ==
On the night of September 24, 1982, Banks drank a large quantity of gin and took prescription drugs at his home on Schoolhouse Lane in Wilkes-Barre, Pennsylvania. The next morning on September 25, 1982, he used an AR-15 semi-automatic rifle to kill eight people in his house, including three women in their 20s (all girlfriends and mothers of his children) and five children, four of them his. Two of the women were sisters. Banks dressed in military fatigues and went outside, where he saw 22-year-old Jimmy Olsen and 24-year-old Ray Hall Jr, leaving a house across the street. He shot them both, reportedly yelling that they "would not tell anyone about this" before firing. He hit both men, fatally wounding Hall; Olsen survived. Banks drove away.

Banks went to Heather Highlands mobile home park, where his former girlfriend Sharon Mazzillo and their son Kissamayu lived, of whom he had been trying to gain custody. Banks forced his way in and shot Mazzillo. He then shot and killed his sleeping son. Banks killed Sharon's mother, who was trying to call the police, and Sharon's 7-year-old nephew, who was also in the home. Sharon was shot in the heart and the other three were shot in the head. Sharon's brothers, whom Banks did not see, hid, one in a closet and one under his mother's bed. They were the only survivors. They called the police and identified Banks as the shooter.

When police examined the victims at the mobile home park, they connected the incident to Olsen and Hall's shooting, which had been discovered at Schoolhouse Lane. They next found Banks's victims in his house. Police began to search for Banks, who abandoned his car and carjacked another vehicle. After abandoning the stolen vehicle, Banks stopped in an isolated grassy area to rest, and subsequently fell asleep.

After Banks awoke, he visited his mother's house (also in Wilkes-Barre.) He was said to have confessed his crimes to her. She drove him to the house of Jacob Whitt, a friend of Banks, where he sent her away and prepared for a standoff with police.

A standoff between Banks and police began. The police brought his mother to their base to talk with Banks. They tried various tactics to get the murderer to surrender, including having a false news report played over WILK radio saying that the children were alive and needed blood to survive. The police tried other tactics to draw Banks out of the house. Finally, Robert Brunson, a former co-worker of Banks, was able to talk him out after a 4-hour standoff. On September 30, 1982, Banks was charged with eight counts of murder, attempted murder, aggravated assault, reckless endangerment, grand theft auto, armed robbery, and felonious theft. Banks was held without bail.

== Victims ==
=== Killed ===
At Schoolhouse Lane

1. Regina Clemens (29) - Girlfriend of George Banks.
2. Montanzima Banks (6) - Daughter of Clemens and Banks.
3. Susan Yuhas (23) - Girlfriend of Banks, sister of Regina Clemens.
4. Boende Banks (4) - Son of Yuhas and Banks.
5. Mauritania Banks (20 months) - Daughter of Yuhas and Banks.
6. Dorothy Lyons (29) - Girlfriend of George Banks.
7. Nancy Lyons (11) - Daughter of Dorothy Lyons.
8. Foraroude Banks (1) - Son of Dorothy Lyons and George Banks.
9. Raymond F. Hall Jr. (24) - Bystander shot across from Banks' house on Schoolhouse Lane.

At Heather Highlands mobile home

1. Sharon Mazzillo (24) - Former girlfriend.
2. Kissmayu Banks (5) - Son of Sharon Mazzillo and George Banks.
3. Scott Mazzillo (7) - Nephew of Sharon Mazzillo.
4. Alice Mazzillo (47) - Sharon Mazzillo's mother.

=== Wounded ===
1. James Olsen (22) - Bystander, shot on Schoolhouse Lane.

== Perpetrator ==
George Emil Banks (June 22, 1942 – November 2, 2025) was born in Wilkes-Barre, Pennsylvania, on June 22, 1942, to John Mack, who was black, and Mary Yelland, who was white. His parents were not married.

In 1961 at 19, after being discharged from the Army, Banks and some accomplices robbed a tavern, shooting and injuring the unarmed owner. He was sentenced to six to fifteen years in prison, which was extended when he briefly escaped in 1964; however, he was granted parole in 1969, and his sentence was commuted by then Governor Milton Shapp in 1974.

After his release from prison, he married a black woman, Doris M. Banks on August 23, 1969. They had two daughters together. The couple divorced in 1976, after which Banks exclusively dated white women. By September 1982, he had broken up with girlfriend Sharon Mazillo, who had lived with him at one time, and they were disputing custody of their young son. He was living together with three girlfriends and their four children he had fathered; one also had another man's daughter living with them.

Banks was hired as a correctional officer at Camp Hill, Pennsylvania, in 1980, despite his criminal record that included the eight years served in prison after the 1961 armed robbery. In 1982, shortly before his murder spree, Banks told coworkers that he believed a race war was imminent and that he wished to save the five children he had fathered with four different white girlfriends from the horrors of racism he had supposedly suffered as a child. On September 6, he locked himself in a guard tower with a shotgun and threatened to commit suicide—as a result, he was placed on extended leave and ordered to undergo mental-health examination at a Harrisburg-area hospital.

== Aftermath ==
On June 6, 1983, Banks' trial began at the Luzerne County Courthouse in Wilkes Barre, Pennsylvania. Albert Joseph Flora Jr. was appointed to be his defense attorney. Banks insisted on testifying. He said that he had only wounded some of the victims and police had killed them. Several scene witnesses, Banks family members, and Olsen testified. Olsen identified Banks as the person who shot him and left him for dead. Closing arguments took place on June 21, 1983. At his murder trial, his attorneys tried to argue that, because he was mixed race, he had suffered severely from racism as a child. Banks' attorney also argued that he was insane. However, the jury found Banks guilty of 12 counts of first-degree murder, one count of third-degree murder, attempted murder, aggravated assault, and one count each of robbery, theft, and endangering the life of another person. On June 22, 1983, the jury recommended the death penalty.

Banks was incarcerated in the maximum-security unit at Huntingdon until November 1985. His appeals reached the U.S. Supreme Court, but it refused to overturn his verdict. He was then sent to the Correctional Institute at Graterford, where he was housed in a contained housing unit.

From 1987 to 2000, Banks' attorneys continued to appeal his case. The U.S. Supreme Court refused to hear his attorneys' argument that he lacked the mental competency to be executed. Pennsylvania Governor Tom Ridge twice signed a death warrant for Banks; however, both times federal appellate courts stayed his execution.

In 2001, 2006, and 2008, the court held hearings about the mental state of Banks to determine if he could be executed. He exhibited delusional behavior that caused the court to rule him incompetent for execution. During this period, various appeals were being heard by state and federal courts. In 2010, another hearing was held on his competency; his attorney said his mental state had deteriorated significantly since 1982. A judge ruled that Banks was mentally incompetent for execution or to assist his attorneys in seeking clemency. He would continue to be held in a restricted housing unit at Graterford Prison. In September 2017, he was still on death row in Pennsylvania. He was later transferred to SCI-Phoenix in May 2018.

On November 2, 2025, Banks died at the age of 83 in his cell at SCI-Phoenix. The coroner said in a statement that an autopsy was performed, and the cause of death was kidney cancer.

== Determined incompetent for execution ==
During appeals of his case, Banks was examined more than once in competency hearings by the court to determine if he was competent for execution. He was found mentally incompetent on three occasions. In 2006, psychiatrists testified that he was "psychotic, delusional, and irrational." In May 2010, a Luzerne County Common Pleas judge held a new hearing and determined that Banks was mentally incompetent for execution or to assist his attorney in a clemency appeal. In September 2017, he was held in a restricted housing unit at Graterford prison. He was relocated to SCI Phoenix following the 2018 closure of SCI Graterford.

== See also ==
- List of rampage killers
- Gun violence in the United States
- Mass shootings in the United States
