= Port Griffith, Pennsylvania =

Unincorporated community in Pennsylvania, US

- Unincorporated community
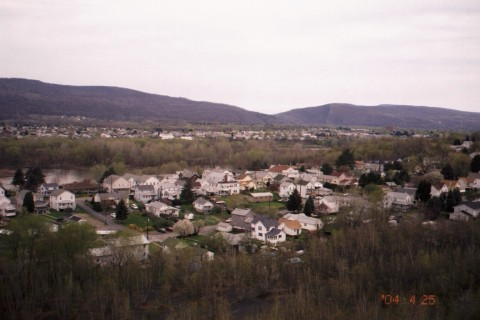
- View looking down on the southern end of the Village of Port Griffith

- Location of Port Griffith in Pennsylvania Port Griffith, Pennsylvania (the United States)
- Coordinates: 41°18′39″N 75°48′38″W
- Country: United States
- State: Pennsylvania
- County: Luzerne
- Township: Jenkins
- Elevation: 643 ft (196 m)
- Time zone: UTC-5 (Eastern (EST))
  - Summer (DST): UTC-4 (EDT)
- ZIP code: 18640
- Area code: 570
- FIPS code: 42-42079
- GNIS feature ID: 1212505

Port Griffith is an unincorporated community found within the Greater Pittston metropolitan area of Jenkins Township, Luzerne County, Pennsylvania, United States.

== Geography ==
Port Griffith is located at 41°18′39″N 75°48′38″W (41.310914, -75.810472) in the Greater Pittston Area of Jenkins Township. Its elevation is 643 feet (196 m). Port Griffith can be found bordering the Susquehanna River.

== History ==
On January 22, 1959, a cave-in occurred at the Knox Coal Mine in Greater Pittston's Port Griffith. Twelve people died, 69 others escaped. The bodies of the twelve who died were never recovered, despite efforts of divers and an attempt to pump the water out of the mining shafts. The Knox Mine Disaster essentially shut down the mining industry in Northeastern Pennsylvania.
