= Old Boston, Pennsylvania =

Unincorporated community in Pennsylvania, U.S.

Coordinates: 41°17′36″N 75°46′06″W

Old Boston is an unincorporated community in Jenkins Township, Luzerne County, Pennsylvania. It is located in the Wyoming Valley, east of Interstate 81 and along Interstate 476, just south of the Wyoming Valley Interchange of the Pennsylvania Turnpike. WVIA-TV, the Scranton/Wilkes-Barre PBS affiliate, is located in Old Boston, which uses the Pittston ZIP code of 18640.
