= Laflin, Pennsylvania =

Borough in Pennsylvania, US

- Borough
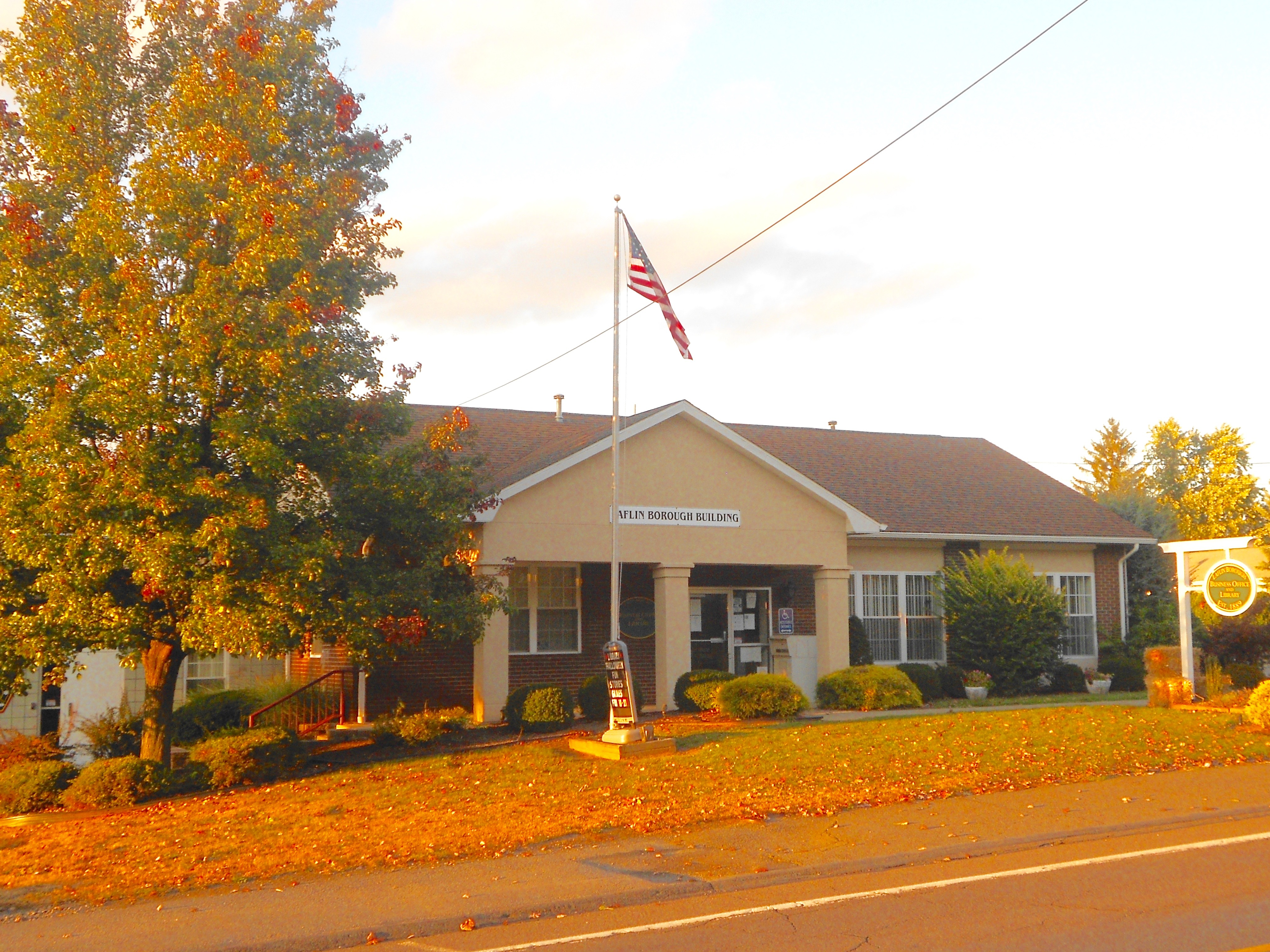
- Municipal Building

- Location of Laflin in Luzerne County, Pennsylvania.

- Location within Pennsylvania Location within the United States
- Coordinates: 41°17′25″N 75°47′34″W
- Country: United States
- State: Pennsylvania
- County: Luzerne
- Region: Greater Pittston
- Incorporated: 1889

Government
  - Type: Borough Council
  - Mayor: William C. Kennedy

Area
  - Total: 1.31 sq mi (3.40 km^{2})
  - Land: 1.31 sq mi (3.40 km^{2})
  - Water: 0 sq mi (0.00 km^{2})

Population (2020)
  - Total: 1,451
  - Density: 1,106.7/sq mi (427.28/km^{2})
- Time zone: UTC-5 (Eastern (EST))
  - Summer (DST): UTC-4 (EDT)
- Zip code: 18702
- Area code: 570
- FIPS code: 42-40848
- Website: www.laflinboro.com

Laflin is a borough in the Greater Pittston area of Luzerne County, Pennsylvania, United States. The population was 1,443 at the time of the 2020 census.

== History ==
Laflin was incorporated as a borough in 1889. It was likely named for one of the owners of the Laflin & Rand Powder Company. The following year, in 1890, the population of the newly formed borough was just over two hundred. Coal mining led to a population boom in the region.

Laflin witnessed its greatest increase between 1970 and 1980, when the number of residents grew by over 313% (or from 399 people to 1,650 people).

== Geography ==
According to the United States Census Bureau, the borough has a total area of 1.4 square miles (3.5 km^{2}), all of it land.

== Demographics ==
Historical population
Census	Pop.	Note	%±
1890	231		—
1900	254		10.0%
1910	528		107.9%
1920	473		−10.4%
1930	421		−11.0%
1940	386		−8.3%
1950	258		−33.2%
1960	235		−8.9%
1970	399		69.8%
1980	1,650		313.5%
1990	1,498		−9.2%
2000	1,502		0.3%
2010	1,487		−1.0%
2020	1,451		−2.4%
2021 (est.)	1,446	▼	−0.3%

As of the census of 2000, there were 1,502 people, 612 households, and 452 families residing in the borough.

The population density was 1,111.0 inhabitants per square mile (429.0/km^{2}). There were 632 housing units at an average density of 467.5 per square mile (180.5/km^{2}).

The racial makeup of the borough was 95.61% White, 0.13% African American, 3.66% Asian, 0.13% from other races, and 0.47% from two or more races. Hispanic or Latino of any race were 0.60% of the population.

There were 612 households, out of which 26.6% had children under the age of eighteen living with them; 62.9% were married couples living together, 9.0% had a female householder with no husband present, and 26.1% were non-families. 24.7% of all households were made up of individuals, and 12.1% had someone living alone who was sixty-five years of age or older.

The average household size was 2.44 and the average family size was 2.90.

In the borough the population was spread out, with 20.5% under the age of eighteen, 4.5% from eighteen to twenty-four, 24.8% from twenty-five to forty-four, 33.4% from forty-five to sixty-four, and 16.8% who were sixty-five years of age or older. The median age was forty-five years.

For every one hundred females there were 88.9 males. For every one hundred females aged eighteen and over, there were 86.9 males.

The median income for a household in the borough was $55,658, and the median income for a family was $69,226. Males had a median income of $50,433 compared with that of $29,375 for females.

The per capita income for the borough was $29,581.

Roughly 1.5% of families and 2.5% of the population were living below the poverty line, including 4.0% of those who were under the age of eighteen and 3.9% of those who were aged sixty-five or over.

== Government ==
The government consists of a mayor and a five-member borough council. As of June 2024, the mayor is William C Kennedy, and the members of the Borough Council are Marc Malvizzi (Council President), Joe Boos (Vice President), Drew Malvizzi, Melissa Werner, and Carl Yastremski.

== Infrastructure ==
Major highways include Interstate 81 and Route 315.

== Education ==
It is in the Wilkes-Barre Area School District.
