= Knox Mine disaster =

1959 coal mining accident in Pennsylvania, United States

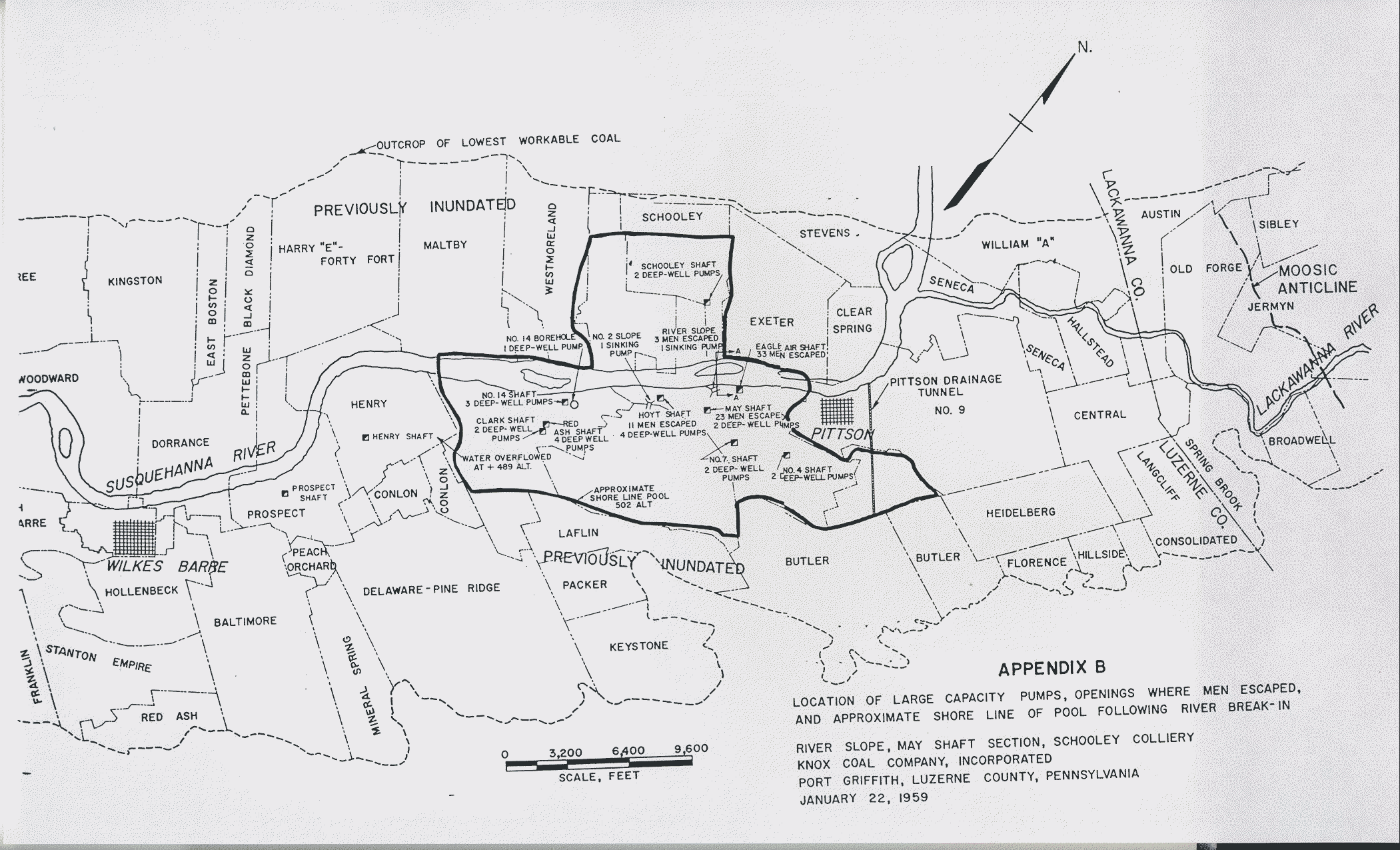
- Map of Knox Mine disaster showing inundated area and shafts used for escape and dewatering
- Date: January 22, 1959
- Location: Jenkins Township, Pennsylvania, United States; 41.308°N 75.823°W
- Type: Mining accident
- Cause: Mining too close to waterway resulting in breaching of mine ceiling and walls and flooding
- Deaths: 12

The Knox Mine disaster was a mining accident on January 22, 1959, at the River Slope Mine, an anthracite coal mine, in Jenkins Township, Pennsylvania. The Susquehanna River broke through the ceiling and flooded the mine. Twelve miners were killed. The accident all but ended deep mining in the northern anthracite field of Pennsylvania.

== Accident ==
The River Slope mine was leased by the Knox Coal Company from the Pennsylvania Coal Company. In late 1956, with the first lease approaching exhaustion, Knox extended the mine into a new area, much of which was under the Susquehanna. It was legal to mine under the river, but various required precautions were neglected. The thickness of the roof (rock under which drilling was done) was largely unknown. It was supposed to be established by drilling boreholes down from the riverbed. A thickness of at least 50 feet (15 m) was considered normal. But the mine was extended into areas where no boreholes had been drilled, and Knox did not drill any new ones. Knox dug chambers beyond what had been requested in the original proposal, without updating mine maps, and chambers climbed toward the surface, to follow the coal seam. Ultimately it was found that the location of the cave-in had a roof cover of only 6 to 8 feet (1.8 to 2.4 m). On the day of the cave-in, the river was dangerously high and icy due to a thaw and heavy rain.

The hole in the riverbed caused the river to flood into many interconnected mine galleries in the Wyoming Valley between the right-bank (western shore) town of Exeter, Pennsylvania, and the left-bank (eastern shore) town of Port Griffith in Jenkins Township, near Pittston. It took three days to plug the hole, which was done by dumping large railroad cars, smaller mine cars, coal waste, and other debris into the whirlpool formed by the water draining into the mine. Eventually, an estimated 10 billion US gallons (38,000,000 m^{3}; 8.3×10^{9} imp gal) of water filled the mines.

Twelve mineworkers died, out of 81 who had reported to work. Amedeo Pancotti was awarded the Carnegie Medal for climbing 50 feet (15 m) up the abandoned Eagle Air Shaft and alerting rescuers, which resulted in the safe recovery of 33 men including Pancotti himself. The bodies of the twelve who died were never recovered, despite efforts to pump the water out of the mine. The victims were Samuel Altieri, John Baloga, Benjamin Boyar, Francis Burns, Charles Featherman, Joseph Gizenski, Dominick Kaveliski, Frank Orlowski, Eugene Ostrowski, William Sinclair, Daniel Stefanides, and Herman Zelonis.

== Aftermath and legacy ==
In the months after the hole in the riverbed was plugged, the mine was made safe for entry by sealing the breach. First a cofferdam was built around it in the Susquehanna; then water was pumped out from inside the cofferdam to expose the riverbed; and loam and clay were dumped over the breach. When it was safe to enter the mine, a workforce reinforced the spot with iron bars, built wooden bulkheads, and poured concrete into the prepared area through boreholes that had been drilled in the riverbed. Finally the cofferdam was removed, allowing the Susquehanna to take its course.

Seven people were indicted on charges of involuntary manslaughter as a result of the disaster, including Robert Dougherty and Louis Fabrizio, owners of the Knox Coal Company; August J. Lippi, president of District 1 of the United Mine Workers; the superintendent and an assistant foreman; and two engineers from the Pennsylvania Coal Company. Although some were convicted, the convictions were reversed on appeal.

Twelve persons and three companies were convicted for giving or accepting bribes, or violations of the Taft-Hartley labor law, or tax evasion. These included Dougherty, Fabrizio, Lippi, and two union officials, who served jail time. During the course of his trials, Lippi was found to be secretly a co-owner of the Knox Coal Company, in violation of Taft-Hartley labor law. After the disaster, the widows of the twelve victims did not receive death benefit payments from the Anthracite Health and Welfare Fund for more than four years.

Within months of the Knox mine disaster, large companies including the Pennsylvania Coal Company, from which the River Slope Mine had been leased, started withdrawing from the anthracite business. By the 1970s no underground mines were extracting anthracite from the northern field. Anthracite production nationally had been in decline since 1917, with only a small rebound during World War II.

== See also ==
- Avondale Mine disaster

== Bibliography ==
- Wolensky, Robert P.; Wolensky, Kenneth C; Wolensky, Nicole H. (1999). The Knox Mine disaster, January 22, 1959: The Final years of the Northern Anthracite Industry and the Effort to Rebuild a Regional Economy. Harrisburg, Pennsylvania: Pennsylvania Historical and Museum Commission. ISBN 0-89271-081-0.
