= Little Nescopeck Creek =

Tributary of Nescopeck Creek in Luzerne County, Pennsylvania, United States

Coordinates: 41.01121°N 75.98862°W

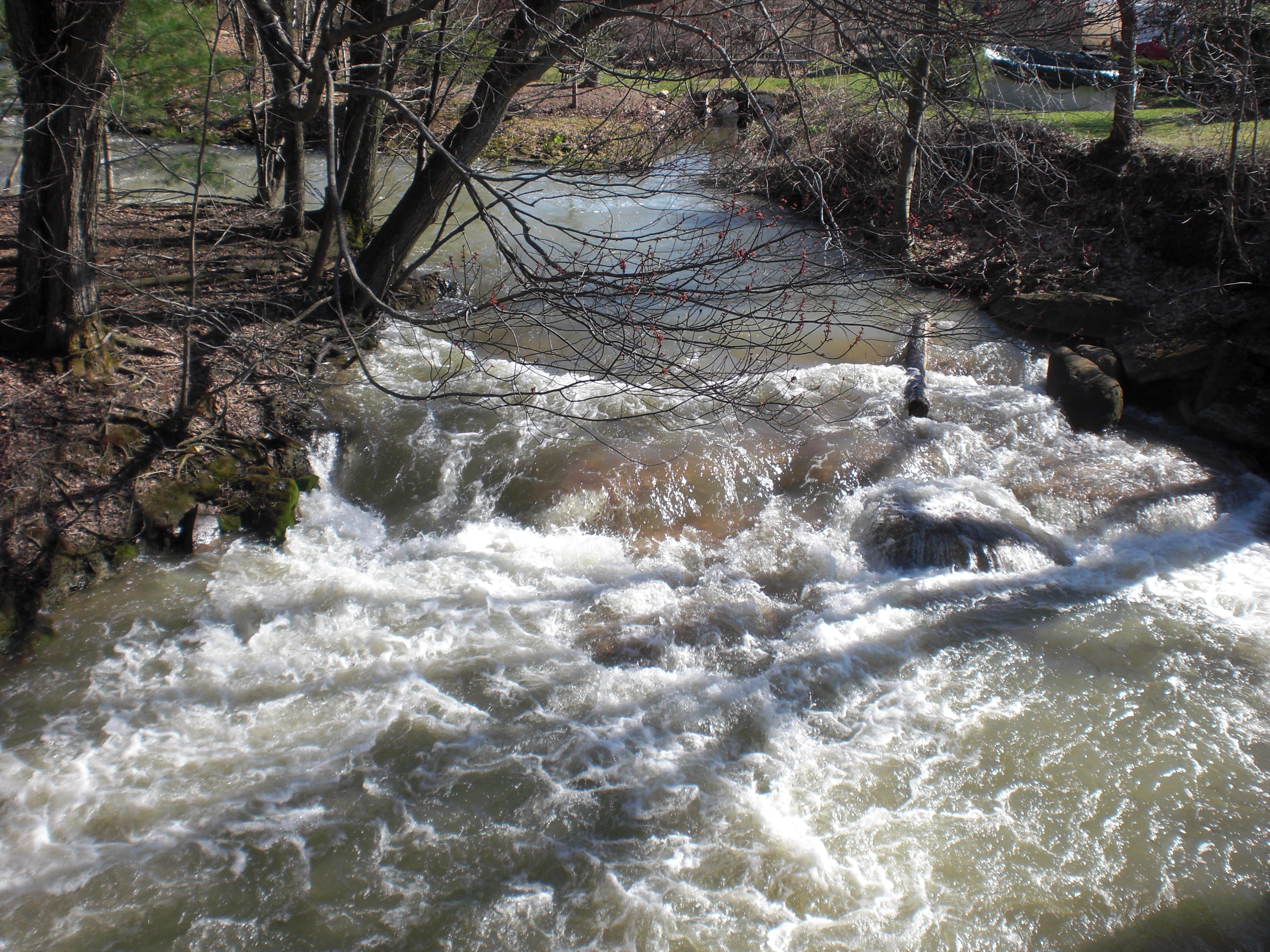
- Little Nescopeck Creek looking upstream near its mouth

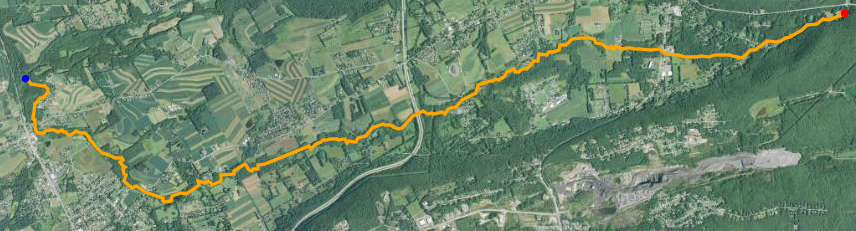
- Satellite map of Little Nescopeck Creek. The red dot is the stream's source and blue dot is its mouth.

Physical characteristics
- Source
  - location: Butler Township
- Mouth
  - location: Sybertsville
  - elevation: 900 ft (270 m)
- Length: 8.5 mi (13.7 km)
- Basin size: 14 sq mi (36 km^{2})

Little Nescopeck Creek is a tributary of Nescopeck Creek in Luzerne County, Pennsylvania, in the United States. It is approximately 8.5 miles (13.7 km) long and flows through Butler Township, Sugarloaf Township, and Conyngham. The watershed of the creek has an area of 14.0 square miles (36 km^{2}). The creek is acidic and receives mine water from the Jeddo Tunnel. The main rock formation in the watershed is the Mauch Chunk Formation. However, the Pottsville Formation also appears in some areas. Soil series in the drainage basin include the Arnot Series, the Basher Series, and various other soil types.

There is one source of acid mine drainage in the watershed of Little Nescopeck Creek: the Jeddo Tunnel. Major roads in the creek's watershed include Interstate 80, Pennsylvania Route 93, and Pennsylvania Route 309. Additionally, wetlands occur in the drainage basin. The watershed of the creek was inhabited by 8000 B.C.E. However, European settlers did not arrive until the 18th century. The Sugarloaf Massacre occurred near the creek in 1780. Recreational opportunities in the watershed include swimming and boating, and there are golf courses, public parks, and rail-trails in within the watershed.

The watershed of Little Nescopeck Creek is designated as a Coldwater Fishery and a Migratory Fishery. Several fish species inhabit the creek near its headwaters, but there is no aquatic life downstream of the Jeddo Tunnel. Fourteen amphibian species and eight reptile species also inhabit the watershed; some of them breed there as well. Dozens of species of insects and macroinvertebrates live in the creek's drainage basin. Common mammals include white-tailed deer, cottontail rabbits, and others. Plants inhabiting the watershed include conifer and hardwood trees, herbs, legumes, and grasses.

== Course ==
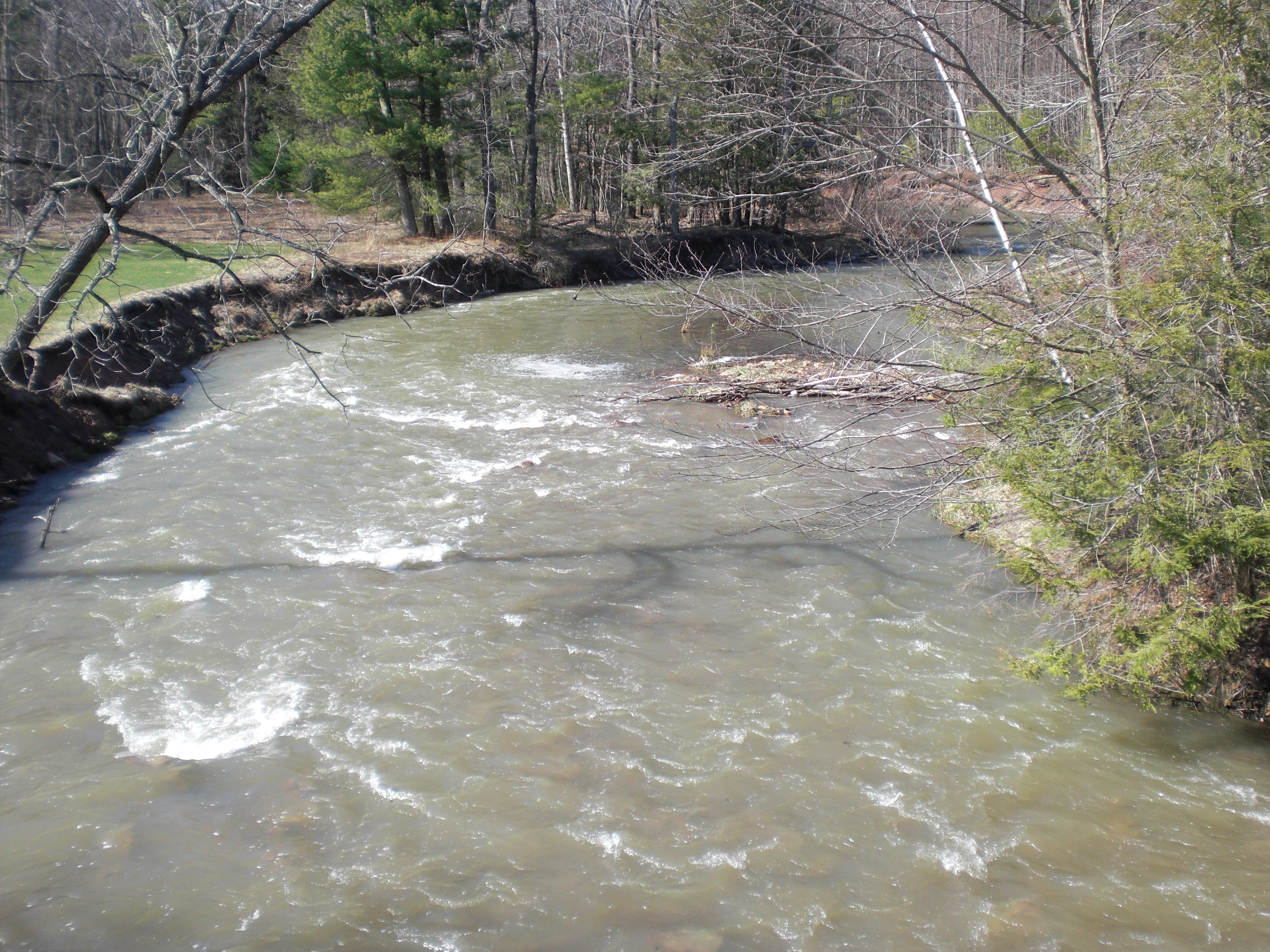
Little Nescopeck Creek north of Conyngham

Little Nescopeck Creek begins in a valley near Prospect Rock in Butler Township. It flows west-southwest for a few tenths of a mile before turning west-northwest as its valley broadens. The creek crosses Pennsylvania Route 309 before turning west-southwest after more than a mile. It then turns west-southwest for several miles, crossing Interstate 81 and entering Sugarloaf Township, where it flows along the base of Butler Mountain. In Sugarloaf Township, the creek turns northwest for several tenths of a mile, passing through Conyngham before turning north. Several tenths of a mile further downstream, it reaches its confluence with Nescopeck Creek. Little Nescopeck Creek joins Nescopeck Creek 19.26 miles (31.00 km) upstream of its mouth.

== Hydrology ==
Before the Jeddo Tunnel was constructed, Little Nescopeck Creek was around ten feet wide. However the creek it is currently around 30 to 40 feet wide. This is also ten times wider than the creek was in the early 18th century. However, other factors besides the Jeddo Tunnel, such as discharges from sewage treatment plants and an increase in storm water runoff have also contributed to the widening of the creek. Plans to fix the pollution of Little Nescopeck Creek via the Jeddo Tunnel include reducing the tunnel's discharge and the construction of wetlands. Little Nescopeck Creek's discharge upstream of the Jeddo Tunnel is 2.18 cubic feet per second. Downstream of the tunnel, the discharge is 60.02 cubic feet per second. The creek's specific conductance upstream of the Jeddo Tunnel is 178.3 micromhos per centimeter. Downstream of the tunnel, the specific conductance is 446.13 micromhos per centimeter.

The average level of precipitation in the Little Nescopeck Creek watershed between 1932 and 1998 was 49 inches per year. Near Little Nescopeck Creek's confluence with Nescopeck Creek, there are white-water rapids that are rated as Class III. Some areas of the creek are also rated Class IV. Little Nescopeck Creek is one of the main sources of flooding in Conyngham.

=== Water quality ===
Between 1996 and 1998, the average pH of Little Nescopeck Creek was 4.6. During the same period, the waters of the creek contained an average of 130.87 milligrams per liter of sulfate, 4.03 milligrams per liter of aluminum, 2.01 milligrams per liter of iron, 1.83 milligrams per liter of manganese, and 0.31 milligrams per liter of zinc.

Upstream of the Jeddo Tunnel, the manganese concentration of the water of Little Nescopeck Creek averages around 108 micrograms per liter. Downstream of the tunnel, the average manganese concentration is 3320 micrograms per liter. Upstream of the tunnel, the average aluminum concentration is under 200 micrograms per liter. Downstream of the tunnel, the average aluminum concentration is 7470 micrograms per liter. Upstream of the tunnel, the average iron concentration is 380 micrograms per liter. Downstream of the tunnel, the average iron concentration is 1947 micrograms per liter. Upstream of the tunnel, the average nickel concentration is below 50 micrograms per liter. The average nickel concentration for the whole watershed is almost three times higher, at 144 micrograms per liter. The average zinc concentration is under 10 micrograms per liter above the Jeddo Tunnel but 519 micrograms per liter downstream of the tunnel. The calcium average concentration above the tunnel is 16.2 milligrams per liter. The average calcium concentration below the tunnel is 32.5 milligrams per liter.

There are between 10 and 36 micrograms per liter of copper in nine different sites in and near Little Nescopeck Creek. There are between 1 and 3.3 micrograms per liter of lead at these sites on the creek. There are between 10 and 621 micrograms per liter of zinc at these sites. The average concentration of sulfates upstream of the Jeddo Tunnel is below 10 milligrams per liter, but it is 257 milligrams per liter downstream of the tunnel. The average concentration of calcium carbonate upstream of the tunnel is 33 milligrams per liter, and downstream of it, it is 272 milligrams per liter.

There are also a number of non-metallic pollutants in the Little Nescopeck Creek watershed. Ammonia is one such pollutant, although the Jeddo Tunnel contributes little to the creek. There is also phosphorus and nitrite in the creek, but the tunnel does not contribute a measurable amount of such compounds.

In three different sites on Little Nescopeck Creek downstream of the Jeddo Tunnel, the daily load of aluminum passing through ranges from 2,871 to 3,175 pounds (1,302 to 1,440 kg). In the same sites, the daily load of iron ranges between 859 and 1,126 pounds (390 and 511 kg). The daily load of manganese at the sites ranges from 1,350 to 1,432 pounds (612 to 650 kg). At one site upstream of the Jeddo Tunnel, these values are much lower. The daily load of aluminum is 2.8 pounds (1.3 kg), the daily load of iron is 11.3 pounds (5.1 kg), and the daily load of manganese is 2.6 pounds (1.2 kg).

== Geography and geology ==
The elevation near the mouth of Little Nescopeck Creek is 860 feet (260 m) above sea level. The elevation of the creek's source is between 1,420 and 1,440 feet (430 and 440 m) above sea level. The creek is in the ridge and valley physiographic province.

Little Nescopeck Creek is mostly situated on top of the Mauch Chunk Formation, a Mississippian period rock that consists of shale, conglomerate, and coarse gray sandstone. Areas containing the Mauch Chunk Formation in the watershed include the bottom of the Little Nescopeck Creek valley and Nescopeck Mountain. The Pottsville Formation is another formation in the creek's watershed. It consists of coarse sandstone, gray quartz conglomerate, and shale with some coal. The Pottsville Formation is found in small amounts on Nescopeck Mountain. There is no coal in the watershed of Little Nescopeck Creek. The watershed has never been mined.

There are several main types of soil in the watershed of Little Nescopeck Creek. Two of them are the Arnot Series and the Alluvial land. The Arnot Series soil is shallow and drained well. It ranges between close to flat and steep. The Alluvial land ranges between close to flat and moderately sloping. It contains gravel and stones and is found along flood plains within the watershed. A large number of other types of soils are found in very small amounts in the creek's watershed. One type of soil that is also found in the Little Nescopeck Creek watershed is the Basher Series. Along the creek near Sybertsville, this type of soil is reddish-brown and sticky to a depth of six there inches (15 centimeters). From 6 to 18 inches (15 to 46 centimeters), the soil is reddish-brown with some areas of yellowish-red. From 18 to 24 inches (46 to 61 centimeters), the soil is reddish-brown with pinkish-gray areas and is a sandy loam. From 24 to 37 inches (61 to 94 centimeters), the soil is reddish-brown with pinkish-gray areas and is a sandy loam. From 37 to 47 inches (94 to 119 centimeters), the soil is reddish-brown with light gray and yellowish-red areas, and is a coarse sandy loam. From 47 to 53 inches (120 to 130 centimeters), the soil is a reddish-gray sandy loam with some yellowish-red areas. From 53 to 62 inches (130 to 160 centimeters), the soil is reddish-gray and contains sand and gravel.

The creek's river valley is steep and narrow. Nescopeck Mountain is in the northern part of the watershed and Buck Mountain is in the southern part. The elevation in the watershed ranges from between 850 and 1800 feet. There is very little limestone near the creek, thus making it very acidic.

There are several floodplains in the watershed of Little Nescopeck Creek. The largest of them is near where the creek turns northward, but there is also one not far from its headwaters.

== Watershed ==
The watershed of Little Nescopeck Creek has an area of 14.0 square miles (36 km^{2}). The mouth of the creek is in the United States Geological Survey quadrangle of Sybertsville. The watershed extends over Sugarloaf Township, Butler Township, Conyngham, and an extremely small part of Hazle Township. The communities of Drums and Kis-Lyn are also in the watershed. The Little Nescopeck Creek watershed is bordered by the Black Creek watershed to the south and the main stem of Nescopeck Creek to the north.

The Little Nescopeck Creek watershed is affected by pollution from the Jeddo Tunnel. However this is the only source of acid mine drainage in the watershed. The pollution of the Jeddo Tunnel affects Nescopeck Creek, the Susquehanna River, and the Chesapeake Bay. The creek's watershed consists mostly of farmland and suburbs. However, there are also some woodlands and riparian buffers. The major highways in the Little Nescopeck Creek watershed are Interstate 80, Pennsylvania Route 93, and Pennsylvania Route 309.

There are a number of different types of wetlands in the Little Nescopeck Creek watershed. One type of wetland is the various palustrine, which is scattered in small areas along the creek. The palustrine forested wetland is the type of wetland that makes up the largest patch of wetland in the creek's watershed. This patch's dimensions are 1 by 0.1 miles (1.61 by 0.16 km). In the northeastern part of the watershed there are palustrine shrub-scrub, deciduous, broad-leaved evergreen wetlands. In the northwestern portion of the watershed there are palustrine unconsolidated bottom and palustrine forested broad-leaved deciduous wetlands.

== History ==
The area in the vicinity of Little Nescopeck Creek was inhabited by Native Americans as early as 8000 B.C. Some of the earliest people to settle in the Little Nescopeck Creek watershed were the Lenni Lenape. European occupation of the creek's watershed began at the middle of the 1700s. The construction of the Susquehanna and Lehigh Turnpike also helped to increase the population of the Little Nescopeck Creek watershed.

The Sugarloaf Massacre occurred near Little Nescopeck Creek on September 11, 1780. In 1809, Redmond Conyngham built a sawmill on M. Beishline's land on Little Nescopeck Creek in southwestern Butler Township. In 1810, a carding mill was built on the creek in what was then known as the community of Ashville. Redmond Conyngham also built a gristmill across the creek from the sawmill in 1814. Phillip Drum built a woolen mill near the carding mill in 1835. The creek flooded during Hurricane Agnes in 1972.

There are a number of historical sites in the Little Nescopeck Creek watershed. Most of them are devoted to the anthracite industry. Little Nescopeck Creek's name comes from a Lenni Lenape word meaning "deep black river".

In 1995, a $50,000 grant was given to the Wildlands Conservancy to improve the water quality of Little Nescopeck Creek. Since the beginning of the 21st century, traffic in the Little Nescopeck Creek watershed has multiplied fourfold. The Environmental Protection Agency has established five sites along Little Nescopeck Creek. They are called LNESC5, LNESC6, LNESC7, and LNESC9. The last of these is upstream of the Jeddo Tunnel, but the other sites are downstream of the tunnel.

== Biology ==
The drainage basin of Little Nescopeck Creek is designated as a Coldwater Fishery and a Migratory Fishery. However, downstream of the Jeddo Tunnel there is no aquatic life. Although there are plans to restore the fish population on the creek, such plans are impossible to carry out in the near future, due to the expense that would be required for such a restoration. Near the creek's headwaters there are sunfish, brook trout and brown trout and bass. The brown trout and brook trout are native. In 1998, a total of 56 fish over eight different taxa were discovered upstream of the Jeddo Tunnel. The most common species were creek chub and white sucker. One brook trout was discovered in the creek. Upstream of the Jeddo Tunnel, there are also turtle and salamander populations. There are a total of 14 species of amphibians in the watershed. Of these, ten species breed in the watershed. There are also a total of eight species of reptiles in the watershed. They consist of two turtles and six snakes. Only the two turtles breed in the watershed. Additionally, there are more than 50 species of birds in the watershed.

The most common large game animal in the Little Nescopeck Creek watershed is the white-tailed deer. Cottontail rabbits are also common in the watershed, especially in the areas devoted to farming. Beavers, raccoons, and muskrats are the most common fur-bearing animals in the watershed.

The macroinvertebrates in the area of Little Nescopeck Creek include five species of flies, five species of caddisflies, four species of mayflies, three species of stone flies, two species of alder flies, two species of beetles, one species of gastropod, and one species of sow bug. There are 30 species of butterflies on the watershed of Little Nescopeck Creek. Of these, seven breed in the creek's watershed. The creek's watershed is also home to seven species of dragonflies and damselflies. Of these, three species breed in the creek's watershed.

Common plants in the Little Nescopeck Creek watershed include conifer and hardwood trees, herbs, legumes, and grasses. The plants in the Little Nescopeck Creek watershed are fairly typical for the Ridge-and-Valley province. Resident deciduous trees in the watershed include five species of oak, one species of cherry, five species of maple, one species of walnut, two species of hickory, and four species of birch, two species of dogwood, and one species each of basswood, poplar, ash, and beech. All but four of these trees are found in the creek's riparian zone. Coniferous trees in the watershed include three species of pine, two species of spruce, and one species of hemlock. Four of these species are found in the creek's riparian zone. There are also 16 species of legumes, grasses, and weeds, seven species of bushes, and six species of perennials. All of the bushes and perennials, and seven of the grasses are found in Little Nescopeck Creek's riparian zone. There are also a number of aquatic plants in Little Nescopeck Creek. These include bulrush, pondweed, duckweed, waterweed, and some types of algae, all of which are typical for a stream in the eastern United States. The forest around the creek's headwaters are composed mostly of oak and hickory.

Little Nescopeck Creek's riparian zone has survived to date due to conservation efforts of the local community. The narrowest area of the riparian zone is zero feet in a pasture one mile upstream of the Jeddo Tunnel. The widest area of the riparian zone is 500 feet (150 m) on the Keystone Jobs Corps Center property. At Little Nescopeck Creek's confluence with Nescopeck Creek, the riparian zone is 100 feet (30 m) wide or more.

There are a total of five species of special concern in the Little Nescopeck Creek watershed. These include the mountain starwort, which is critically endangered in Pennsylvania.

== Recreation ==
There are few opportunities for activities in Little Nescopeck Creek itself, such as swimming and boating. However, there are some golf courses, public parks, and rail-trails within the creek's watershed. The four golf courses are the Sugarloaf Golf Course, the Sand Springs Golf Course, the Edgewood in the Pines Golf Course, and the private Valley Country Club. There are three recreational sites in the creek's watershed. One is the Butler Recreation Complex in the eastern part of the watershed. The other two are the Whispering Willow Park and the Historic Brainard Church in the western part of the watershed.

In 1998, there were plans to convert abandoned railroad beds in the Little Nescopeck Creek watershed to rail-trails. There are already a number of trails in the watershed. Some of these date back to Native American times. There are also a number of outlooks in the creek's watershed. There is some kayak traffic on the creek during the spring. There is a 24-acre area of fields and woodlands known as the Bishop Tract; a portion of this tract is along Little Nescopeck Creek.

== See also ==
- Black Creek (Nescopeck Creek), next tributary of Nescopeck Creek going downstream
- Long Run (Nescopeck Creek), next tributary of Nescopeck Creek going upstream
