= Little Nescopeck Creek A =

Little Nescopeck Creek Little Nescopeck Creek A

Physical characteristics
- Source
  - location: Crystal Lake in Bear Creek Township, Pennsylvania
  - elevation: between 1,940 and 1,960 feet (590 and 600 m)
- Mouth
  - location: Nescopeck Creek in Dennison Township, Luzerne County, Pennsylvania
  - coordinates: 41°05′23″N 75°51′00″W
  - elevation: 1,099 ft (335 m)
- Length: 8.2 mi (13.2 km)
- Basin size: 10.7 mi^{2} (28 km^{2})

Basin features
- Progression: Nescopeck Creek → Susquehanna River → Chesapeake Bay
- Tributaries
  - right: Conety Run

Little Nescopeck Creek is a tributary of Nescopeck Creek in Luzerne County, Pennsylvania, in the United States. It is approximately 8.2 miles (13.2 km) long and flows through Bear Creek Township, Fairview Township, and Dennsion Township. The watershed of the creek has an area of 10.7 square miles (28 km^{2}). The creek has one named tributary, which is known as Conety Run. Little Nescopeck Creek is designated as a Coldwater Fishery and Class A Wild Trout Waters. It is one of the main sources of flooding in Dennison Township. The surficial geology in the vicinity of the creek mainly features alluvium, Wisconsinan Till, Wisconsinan Ice-Contact Stratified Drift, bedrock, and fill. Little Nescopeck Creek shares its name with another river in southern Luzerne county.

== Course ==
Little Nescopeck Creek begins in Crystal Lake in Bear Creek Township. It flows south for several tenths of a mile, passing by several swamps and ponds before turning sharply to the east and then turning southeast. After several tenths of a mile, it exits Bear Creek Township and briefly passes through Fairview Township before entering Dennison Township. Several tenths of a mile further downstream, the creek turns north for several hundred feet before turning south. After a few tenths of a mile, it turns east before turning south and then south-southwest, flowing down Stony Cabin Ridge. After approximately a mile and a half (two and a half kilometers), it reaches the bottom of the ridge and turns west-southwest, entering a valley. After more than a mile, it turns south-southwest for several tenth of a mile before turning southwest and crossing Pennsylvania Route 437. Several tenths of a mile further downstream, the creek receives Conety Run, its only named tributary, from the right. It then turns south before turning southwest and then south again. The creek then turns southwest and after several tenths of a mile, reaches its confluence with Nescopeck Creek.

Little Nescopeck Creek joins Nescopeck Creek 36.58 miles (58.87 km) upstream of its mouth.

=== Tributaries ===
Little Nescopeck Creek has one named tributary, which is known as Conety Run. It joins Little Nescopeck Creek 1.00 mile (1.61 km) upstream of its mouth. Its watershed has an area of 2.32 square miles (6.0 km^{2}).

== Hydrology ==
The pH of Little Nescopeck Creek ranges from 5.8 to 7. The concentration of alkalinity in the creek ranges between 2 and 5 milligrams per liter. The concentration of water hardness ranges from 3 to 8 milligrams per liter and the specific conductance ranges between 19 and 24 micro-siemens.

At its mouth, the peak annual discharge of Little Nescopeck Creek has a 10 percent chance of reaching 1,184 cubic feet per second (33.5 m^{3}/s). It has a 2 percent chance of reaching 2,092 cubic feet per second (59.2 m^{3}/s) and a 1 percent chance of reaching 2,563 cubic feet per second (72.6 m^{3}/s). The peak annual discharge has a 0.2 percent chance of reaching 3,825 cubic feet per second (108.3 m^{3}/s).

Upstream of the tributary Conety Run, the peak annual discharge of Little Nescopeck Creek has a 10 percent chance of reaching 876 cubic feet per second (24.8 m^{3}/s). It has a 2 percent chance of reaching 1,565 cubic feet per second (44.3 m^{3}/s) and a 1 percent chance of reaching 1,923 cubic feet per second (54.5 m^{3}/s). The peak annual discharge has a 0.2 percent chance of reaching 2,950 cubic feet per second (84 m^{3}/s).

== Geography and geology ==
The elevation near the mouth of Little Nescopeck Creek is 1,099 feet (335 m) above sea level. The elevation of the creek's source is between 1,940 and 1,960 feet (590 and 600 m) above sea level.

In its lower reaches, the surficial geology along Little Nescopeck Creek mainly consists of alluvium. There is also a glacial or resedimented till known as Wisconsinan Till in the vicinity of the creek. Some patches of Wisconsinan Ice-Contact Stratified Drift and bedrock consisting of sandstone and shale are present as well, as are a few small patches of fill. In the upper reaches of the creek, the surficial geology features some alluvium and some bedrock. There is also Wisconsinan Till in the area and several wetlands and lakes near its headwaters.

== Watershed ==
The watershed of Little Nescopeck Creek has an area of 10.7 square miles (28 km^{2}). This is slightly smaller than the Little Nescopeck Creek that joins Nescopeck Creek approximately 17 miles (27 km) further downstream. The portion that is upstream of the tributary Conety Run has an area of only 7.30 square miles (18.9 km^{2}). The watershed is in the extreme northeastern part of the watershed of Nescopeck Creek. The creek's mouth is in the United States Geological Survey quadrangle of White Haven. However, its mouth is in the quadrangle of Wilkes-Barre East.

More than 80 percent of the land within 100 feet (30 m) of Little Nescopeck Creek is forested land. Slightly less than 10 percent is agricultural land and only a trace amount is barren land. Some land owned by the Pennsylvania Game Commission is in the watershed of Little Nescopeck Creek. Swamps in the upper reaches of the creek's watershed include Jimmy Kane Swamp and Long Swamp. Lakes include Crystal Lake.

Little Nescopeck Creek is one of the main sources of flooding in Dennison Township.

== History ==
Little Nescopeck Creek was entered into the Geographic Names Information System on August 2, 1979. Its identifier in the Geographic Names Information System is 1179622.

Several substantial floods have occurred on Little Nescopeck Creek. One such flood was caused by Tropical Storm Agnes in June 1972. Other significant floods occurred in September 1924 and May 1942.

== Biology ==
Little Nescopeck Creek is designated as a Coldwater Fishery. It is also considered by the Pennsylvania Fish and Boat Commission to be Class A Wild Trout Waters for a portion of its length, from an unnamed tributary at river mile 3.5 to its mouth.

== See also ==
- Oley Creek, next tributary of Nescopeck Creek going downstream
- Creasy Creek, next tributary of Nescopeck Creek going upstream
- List of rivers of Pennsylvania
