= Gerard & Kelly =

American artist duo

Gerard & Kelly is an American artist duo composed of Brennan Gerard (born 1978, Piqua, OH) and Ryan Kelly (born 1979, Drums, PA). Paris-based artists Brennan Gerard and Ryan Kelly have collaborated for nearly two decades on performance, video, and installation, amongst other formats. With an academic background rooted in ballet, visual art, literature, and gender studies, Gerard & Kelly apply conceptual strategies to art and dance. Through this, they examine themes of memory, history, sexuality, and identity that are fundamental to their practice. The duo has collaborated with Solange Knowles and dancers of the Paris Opera Ballet.

Gerard received a BA in women's and gender studies from Yale University, New Haven (2001), and Kelly received a BA in comparative literature from Fordham University, Bronx, New York (2008). Both artists completed the Whitney Museum Independent Study Program (2010) and received MFAs from the Interdisciplinary Studio at the University of California, Los Angeles (UCLA) School of Art (2013).

Their work is included in the Solomon R. Guggenheim Museum collection, New York; LACMA, Los Angeles. They have also performed at the Pinault Collection in Paris.
