= Long Run (Nescopeck Creek tributary) =

Physical characteristics
- Source
  - location: southern side of a ridge in Butler Township, Luzerne County, Pennsylvania
  - elevation: 1,300 ft (400 m)
- Mouth
  - location: Nescopeck Creek in Butler Township, Luzerne County, Pennsylvania
  - coordinates: 41°01′38″N 76°00′21″W
  - elevation: 958 ft (292 m)
- Length: 3.0 mi (4.8 km)
- Basin size: 4.62 sq mi (12.0 km^{2})

Basin features
- Progression: Nescopeck Creek → Susquehanna River → Chesapeake Bay
- Tributaries
  - left: one unnamed tributary
  - right: one unnamed tributary

Long Run is a tributary of Nescopeck Creek in Luzerne County, Pennsylvania, in the United States. It is approximately 3.0 miles (4.8 km) long and flows through Butler Township. The watershed of the stream has an area of 4.62 square miles (12.0 km^{2}). Land uses in the watershed include forested land, agricultural land, and barren land. The waters of the stream are slightly acidic, but this is not caused by acid mine drainage. It is considered to be Class A Wild Trout Waters, a Coldwater Fishery, and a Migratory Fishery. The stream has two unnamed tributaries and at least one bridge crosses it.

== Course ==
Long Run begins on the southern side of a ridge in Butler Township. It flows west-southwest for several tenths of a mile before crossing Interstate 80 and turning south. After some distance, the stream receives an unnamed tributary from the left and turns west for a few hundred feet. It then receives another unnamed tributary from the right. After this, the stream turns southeast and passes through a large pond before turning southwest. After a few tenths of a mile, it turns west and reaches its confluence with Nescopeck Creek.

Long Run joins Nescopeck Creek 23.80 miles (38.30 km) upstream of its mouth.

== Hydrology ==
Long Run is slightly acidic, with a pH of 6.6. The total concentration of alkalinity in the stream's waters is 4 milligrams per liter and the total concentration of water hardness is 21 milligrams per liter. The specific conductance of the water is 192 micro-mhos. The specific conductance of the stream is nearly twice as high as that of any other major headwater tributary of Nescopeck Creek.

Long Run is not affected by acid mine drainage.

== Geography and geology ==
The elevation near the mouth of Long Run is 958 feet (292 m) above sea level. The elevation of the stream's source is approximately 1,300 feet (400 m) above sea level. Long Run is one of the major tributaries of Nescopeck Creek.

Several rock formations occur in the vicinity of the watershed of Long Run. These include the Mauch Chunk Formation, the Sphechty Kopf Formation, and the Pocono Formation.

== Watershed ==
The watershed of Long Run has an area of 4.62 square miles (12.0 km^{2}). The mouth of the creek is in the United States Geological Survey quadrangle of Sybertsville, but the source is in the United States Geological Survey quadrangle of Freeland. The watershed of the stream is in the north-central part of the Nescopeck Creek watershed and is on the edge of that watershed.

The watershed of Long Run contains approximately 100 miles (160 km) of local roads and approximately 15 miles (24 km) of state roads. This is equal to 12 percent of all the roads in the Nescopeck Creek watershed. Of the sub-watersheds of Nescopeck Creek, only the watershed of the main stem, the Black Creek watershed, and the Little Nescopeck Creek watershed contain more roads. 13 percent of the watershed of Long Run is on agricultural land. This is more than any other sub-watershed of Nescopeck Creek except for the watershed of the main stem (24 percent) and the watershed of Little Nescopeck Creek (30 percent).

Approximately 90 percent of the land within 100 feet (30 m) of Long Run is forested. The remainder of the land is agricultural land or barren land, with agricultural land being more common. However, the riparian buffer of the stream is less complete 500 feet (150 m) away than it is 100 feet (30 m) away.

== History ==
Long Run was entered into the Geographic Names Information System on August 2, 1979. Its identifier in the Geographic Names Information System is 1179893. The stream, along with several dozen other streams in Pennsylvania, was investigated by the Pennsylvania Department of Environmental Protection with the aim of giving it Class A Wild Trout Waters status as early as May 26, 2012.

A concrete culvert bridge was built over Long Run in 2002. It carries State Route 3040 and St. Johns Road and is 23.0 feet (7.0 m) long. A bridge over the stream was replaced at some point. A two-lane temporary road was temporarily installed at the site while the bridge was being replaced.

== Biology ==
Long Run is considered by the Pennsylvania Fish and Boat Commission to be Class A Wild Trout Waters between its headwaters and its mouth. It is also considered to be a Coldwater Fishery and a Migratory Fishery throughout its entire drainage basin. The stream is inhabited by brook trout.

== See also ==
- Oley Creek, next tributary of Nescopeck Creek going upstream
- Little Nescopeck Creek, next tributary of Nescopeck Creek going downstream
