= Skyline Motorsports Park =

Motorsport venue in Tioga Center, New York

- Location: Tioga Center, New York
- Coordinates: 42.0835°N 76.3372°W
Skyline Drags
- Operator: James Robinson, George Coleman and Dave Gennett
- Broke ground: 1999
- Opened: 2004
- Former names: Skyview Drags
- Website: www.skylinedrags.com
- Surface: Pavement
- Length: .2 km (.125 miles)
Shangri-La II Speedway
- Operator: Ray Hodge
- Opened: 2009
- Former names: Shangri-La II Motor Speedway
- Website: www.shang2speedway.com
- Surface: Concrete
- Length: .8 km (.5 miles)
- Turns: 4
- Banking: High-banked

Skyline Motorsports Park is an automotive racing facility in the Southern Tier Region of New York State which features an eighth-mile dragway along with a 1/2-mile (0.80 km) high-banked concrete oval.

== Overview ==
In 1999, George Swansbrough, a part-time oval track racing driver, bought property adjacent to his scrap yard to expand his business. That property, formerly the Skyline Amusement Park, included a partially completed airstrip, which Swansbrough proceeded to finish and open in 2004 as the dragstrip Skyview Drags.

The original Shangri-La Speedway was located less than five miles away from the dragstrip, and was where Swansbrough claimed the 2002 Late Model track championship. When the original closed in 2005, Swansbrough began planning for an oval track next to his dragstrip, opening it in 2009 as Shangri-La II Motor Speedway. Low car counts led to the oval's closure in mid-2015. The dragstrip continued operating until 2018, and the property was sold to Pacific Crest Management in 2023.

== Skyline Drags ==
Drag racing returned to the venue in 2024 with sanctioning by the World Drag Racing Alliance (WDRA). The facility was renamed the following year to Skyline Motorsports Park, and in addition to the WDRA the dragstrip began hosting car shows, tractor pulls, and diesel races, as well as Wednesday night grudge racing.

== Shangri-La II Speedway ==
In 2025, Jason Makarewicz, promoter of Evergreen Raceway in Saint Johns, Pennsylvania, was tapped to re-open the oval. The speedway was refreshed and restarted with a once-a-month schedule which features Sportsman Modifieds, Super Stocks, Hobby Stocks and 4-Cylinder Stocks. In December 2025 it was announced that Ray Hodge, previously the promoter of Chemung Speedrome, had joined the management team.
