= Oley Creek =

- Etymology: after Oley, Pennsylvania

Physical characteristics
- Source
  - location: Foster Township, Luzerne County, Pennsylvania
- Mouth
  - location: Nescopeck Creek in Butler Township, Luzerne County, Pennsylvania
  - coordinates: 41°02′44″N 75°56′21″W
  - elevation: 1,033 ft (315 m)
- Length: 5.2 mi (8.4 km)
- Basin size: 7.2 mi^{2} (19 km^{2})

Basin features
- Tributaries
  - right: Long Hollow

Oley Creek is a tributary of Nescopeck Creek in Luzerne County, Pennsylvania, in the United States. It is approximately 5.2 miles (8.4 km) long. It flows through Foster Township, Dennison Township, and Butler Township. Long Hollow is a tributary of the creek. The creek's watershed has an area of 7.2 square miles (19 km^{2}). It is a high-quality coldwater fishery in its upper reaches and a Class A Wild Trout Fishery for part of its distance. The creek is in the upper reaches of the Nescopeck Creek watershed. It is named after a community in Berks County, Pennsylvania known as Oley.

== Course ==
Oley Creek begins in Foster Township, on the northern side of Green Mountain. It flows north for some distance before crossing Interstate 80 and receiving the tributary Long Hollow. Here, the creek turns west, exiting Foster Township and entering Dennison Township. It continues flowing parallel to Interstate 80 in this township, as well as flowing near the southern edge of Mount Yeager. After a short distance, it turns southwest, away from Interstate 80 and Mount Yeager. The creek passes by a strip mine and turns west, exiting Dennison Township. Upon exiting Dennison Township, the creek enters Butler Township, where it enters a lake. On the other side of the lake, the creek flows for a short distance before reaching its confluence with Nescopeck Creek.

=== Tributaries ===
Oley Creek has one named tributary: Long Hollow. It is in the creek's upper reaches and mostly flows west. Its source is on Mount Yeager.

== Hydrology ==
The pH of Oley Creek is 6.4 and the concentration of alkalinity is 6 milligrams per liter. The hardness of the creek's water is 7 milligrams per liter. The specific conductance is 63 μmhos.

Oley Creek is somewhat affected by acid mine drainage. It has also experienced acid rain.

Annually, 489,900 kilograms (1,080,000 lb) of erosion flows through Oley Creek, as does 837,000 kilograms (1,845,000 lb) of sediment. The annual load of nitrogen in the creek is 5,453 kilograms (12,022 lb) and the annual load of phosphorus is 487 kilograms (1,074 lb). The creek's nitrogen and phosphorus accounts for 1.7 percent and 3 percent of Nescopeck Creek's nitrogen and phosphorus, respectively.

== Watershed, geography, and geology ==
The watershed of Oley Creek is located in the upper part of the Nescopeck Creek watershed. It has an area of 7.2 square miles. The elevation of the creek at its mouth is 1,033 feet (315 m) above sea level. The creek is 4 miles (6.4 km) from the Lehigh River, but is not part of that river system.

There are 10 miles (16 km) of state roads in the watershed of Oley Creek. Significantly more than 80 percent of the watershed's area is forest. Within 100 feet (30 m) of the creek, approximately 80 percent of the land is forested, while less than 10 percent is agricultural land and less than 3 percent is barren.

Beech Mountain Lake is near part of Oley Creek. There is a pond with a surface area of 2.2 acres (8,900 m^{2}) that is located at the headwaters of an unnamed tributary of the creek.

A valley known as the Oley Valley is located on Oley Creek.

All of the Class A Wild Trout Waters on Oley Creek are public and open.

== History and etymology ==
Oley Creek's name comes from the historic community of Oley, in Berks County, which in turn may derive from the Delaware words olink, wólink, olo, or wahlo, which mean "a cavern cell, a sinkhole, a dug hole to bury anything in, as also a tract of land encompassed by high hills".

Historically, Oley Creek was on the western edge of the territory of the Munsee people.

In the past, there were coal mines on Oley Creek near Green Mountain. In the early 1970s, a tributary of the creek was dammed to produce the Lake of the Four Seasons, also known as Beech Mountain Lake. In 2000, the Eastern Pennsylvania Marine Properties Company purchased 2,000 acres (810 ha) on the lake.

The Oley Creek Watershed Association was established on September 4, 2003.

== Biology ==
Although Oley Creek is considered to be an infertile stream, it is also designated as a Class A Wild Brook Trout fishery for a 2.3-mile-long (3.7 km) stretch from the mouth of Long Hollow downstream to Interstate 80. The upper reaches of the watershed are designated as a high-quality coldwater fishery.

== See also ==
- Long Run (Nescopeck Creek), next tributary of Nescopeck Creek going downstream
- Little Nescopeck Creek A, next tributary of Nescopeck Creek going upstream
- List of rivers of Pennsylvania
