= Conety Run =

River in Pennsylvania, United States

Conety Run Conety's Run

Physical characteristics
- Source
  - location: Stony Cabin Ridge in Fairview Township, Luzerne County, Pennsylvania
  - elevation: between 1,980 and 2,000 feet (600 and 610 m)
- Mouth
  - location: Little Nescopeck Creek in Dennison Township, Luzerne County, Pennsylvania
  - coordinates: 41°06′02″N 75°50′32″W
  - elevation: 1,178 ft (359 m)
- Length: 3.6 mi (5.8 km)
- Basin size: 2.32 mi^{2} (6.0 km^{2})

Basin features
- Progression: Little Nescopeck Creek → Nescopeck Creek → Susquehanna River → Chesapeake Bay

Conety Run (also known as Conety's Run) is a tributary of Little Nescopeck Creek in Luzerne County, Pennsylvania, in the United States. It is approximately 3.6 miles (5.8 km) long and flows through Fairview Township and Dennison Township. The watershed of the stream has an area of 2.32 square miles (6.0 km^{2}). The stream is designated as Class A Wild Trout Waters, but was historically stocked. It has an alkalinity concentration of 2 milligrams per liter, but is slightly acidic. The surficial geology in its vicinity mainly consists of alluvium, Wisconsinan Till, Wisconsinan Ice-Contact Stratified Drift, and bedrock consisting of sandstone and shale.

== Course ==
Conety Run begins on Stony Cabin Ridge in Fairview Township. It flows west for a short distance before turning south-southwest for several tenths of a mile. It then passes through Fountain Lake and turns south for several tenths of a mile. The stream then enters Dennison Township and turns south-southeast. After more than a mile, it turns south-southwest and then south, crossing Pennsylvania Route 437. The stream then flows south-southeast for several tenths of a mile until it reaches its confluence with Little Nescopeck Creek.

Conety Run joins Little Nescopeck Creek 1.00 mile (1.61 km) upstream of its mouth.

== Hydrology ==
Conety Run is not considered to be impaired. The concentration of alkalinity in Conety Run is 2 milligrams per liter. The stream is slightly acidic, with a pH of 6.2. The concentration of water hardness is 5 milligrams per liter.

The specific conductance of the waters of Conety Run is 22 micro-siemens.

== Geography and geology ==
The elevation near the mouth of Conety Run is 1,178 feet (359 m) above sea level. The elevation near the stream's source is between 1,980 and 2,000 feet (600 and 610 m) above sea level.

The surficial geology along the lower reaches of Conety Run mainly consists of alluvium. However, bedrock consisting of sandstone and shale, a glacial or resedimented till known as Wisconsinan Till, and a small patch of Wisconsinan Ice-Contact Stratified Drift are also present in the stream's vicinity. In the stream's upper reaches, the surficial geology consists almost entirely of bedrock and Wisconsinan Till.

== Watershed ==
The watershed of Conety Run has an area of 2.32 square miles (6.0 km^{2}). The mouth of the stream is in the United States Geological Survey quadrangle of White Haven. However, its source is in the quadrangle of Wilkes-Barre East. The watershed is in the northwestern part of the Nescopeck Creek watershed. The watershed is considerably longer than it is wide.

Considerably more than 80 percent of the watershed of Conety Run is forested land.

There are fewer than 20 miles (32 km) of local roads in the watershed of Conety Run. There are only a few miles of state roads in the watershed. Pennsylvania Route 437 is in the vicinity of the stream.

A lake known as Fountain Lake is located near the headwaters of Conety Run.

== History ==
Conety Run was entered into the Geographic Names Information System on August 2, 1979. Its identifier in the Geographic Names Information System is 1172312.

The community of Glen Summit Springs was historically located near Conety Run. The Central Railroad of New Jersey and the Lehigh Valley Railroad also passed through that area.

In 2012, the Pennsylvania Fish and Boat Commission requested that Conety Run, along with several dozen other streams in Pennsylvania, be upgraded to High-Quality Coldwater Fishery status. This was requested because of the Class A Wild Trout Waters status of the streams.

== Biology ==
Conety Run is considered by the Pennsylvania Fish and Boat Commission to be Class A Wild Trout Waters for brook trout from its headwaters downstream to its mouth. It has held this status since at least 2012. However, the stream is considered to be infertile.

Fish were stocked in Conety Run in the early 1960s.

== See also ==
- List of rivers of Pennsylvania
