= Sugarloaf massacre =

1780 battle of the American Revolutionary War

Coordinates: 41.011°N 75.989°W

- Part of the American Revolutionary War
Date	September 11, 1780
Location	Little Nescopeck Creek in Luzerne County, Pennsylvania

Belligerents
Natives; Loyalists	Northampton County volunteer militia

Commanders and leaders
Unknown, possibly Roland Montour	Lieutenant John Fish, Lieutenant John Moyer

Strength
Unknown, at least 30	41 men

Casualties and losses
Unknown	At least 10 dead 2 captured Unknown number wounded

The Sugarloaf massacre was a skirmish which occurred on September 11, 1780, in the U.S. state of Pennsylvania when a number of Natives and a handful of Loyalists attacked a small detachment of militia from Northampton County. According to pension files and witness depositions, the militia detachment was led by Lieutenants John Moyer and John Fish of Captain Johannes Van Etten's company of volunteers.

== Background ==
Previous violence between the Iroquois and settlers was one of the contributing factors to the events of the Sugarloaf Massacre. In 1780, there were a large number of attacks by Natives in the vicinity where the massacre took place, including an attempted attack on Moses Van Campen. On June 15, 1780, a group of militia in Northampton were commissioned to serve for seven months, led by Captain Johannes Van Etten.

The communities of Bloomsburg and Catawissa were home to large numbers of Loyalists who aided the British during the American Revolutionary War, and a detachment of 41 of Van Etten's men headed to Northumberland to investigate these settlements in 1780. They were placed under the command of Lieutenants Moyer and Fish, and they left Northampton County in the beginning of September 1780 from Fort Allen and headed into Sugarloaf Valley (Note: Referred to as Scotch Valley in the 1700s) to search for Loyalist sympathizers and spies.

On September 6, approximately 250 to 300 Native warriors and Loyalist soldiers arrived at Fort Rice, near Chillisquaque Creek in Lewis Township, Northumberland County. They attacked the fort and the surrounding residences, but Colonel Hunter sent some troops from Fort Jenkins to their aid. Approximately 200 men arrived at Fort Rice, and the Loyalists and Natives dispersed. Upon retreating, these people went over Knob Mountain and a group of 30 to 40 of them went down the stream known as Cabin Run to Fort Jenkins, which they burned down, along with numerous buildings in the fort's vicinity. They then crossed the Susquehanna River and went to Sugarloaf Valley in southwestern Luzerne County.

== The attack and aftermath ==
The men of the volunteer detachment had just sat down to eat dinner on September 11, 1780, according to survivor Peter Crum, when the Loyalists and Natives started firing muskets at them. Ten militiamen were killed, according to Lieutenant Colonel Stephen Balliet, who had gone with a small force of 150 militia to bury the dead. He wrote in his report:

"On the first notice of this Un fortuned event the officers of the militia have Exerted themselves to get Volunteers out of their Respective Divisions to go up & Burry the Dead, their Labour Proved not in Vain we collected about 150 men & officers Included from the Colonels Kern, Giger & my own Battalions who would undergo the fatigue & Danger to go their & pay that Respect to their slaughtered Brethren, Due to men who fell in support of the freedom of their Country. On the 15th we took up our line of march (want of amination prevented us from going Sooner) on the 17th we arrived at the place of action, where we found Ten of our Soldiers Dead, Scalped, Striped Naked, & in a most cruel & Barbarous manner Tome hawked, their throads Cut, &c. &c. whom we Buried & Returned without even seeing any of these Black allies, & Bloody executors of British Tirrany."

Balliet's burial detail apparently skirmished with some scouts from the Loyalist and Native forces while burying the dead, as Balliet went on to report:

"We also have great Reason to believe that several of the Indians have been killed by our men, in Particular one by Col. Kern & an other by Capt. Moyer both of whom went Volunteers with this party."

Most of the militiamen escaped, with Lieutenant John Moyer, Ensign Scoby, and an unnamed private taken prisoner. Moyer managed to escape, but the other two men were taken to Niagara. Moyer traveled to Fort Wyoming, which he reached on September 14.

After the skirmish, the Loyalist and Native war party searched the surrounding area for several hours. The next day, they took their prisoners down Nescopeck Creek and towards the Susquehanna River before turning towards Berwick and Catawissa, Pennsylvania. The soldiers who escaped the massacre spread the news as far as the Delaware River.

In 1933, the Pennsylvania Historical Commission, the Wyoming Historical and Genealogical Society, and the Sugarloaf Commemorative Committee built a memorial near the location of the massacre. In 1947, a historical marker was installed on Pennsylvania Route 93, near Conyngham.

== Controversy ==
=== Number of men killed ===
The number of militiamen killed in action at the skirmish is difficult to confirm. The earliest and best source, Lieutenant Colonel Stephen Balliet, reported that ten men were buried. Samuel Rea, the County Lieutenant of Northampton County, indicated that Balliet's numbers were probably the most accurate:

"Col. Baliort [Balliet] informs me that he had Given Council a relation of the killed and wounded he had found Burned near Neskipeki as he was at the place of action his Accts must be as near the truth as any, I could procure..."

Lieutenant Moyer, upon his return, said he had seen thirteen scalps on the belts of his captors, but it is hard to believe that they let him count the scalps while he was detained. Captain Van Etten did take a return at the end of the Volunteer's tour of duty, in January 1781. He indicates that 14 men were killed on September 11, 1780. But at least three of these men—George Schellhammer, Peter Crum, and Baltzar Snyder—show up on a few months later, and again in returns the following year, as substitutes (volunteers, not drafted) in Captain William Moyer's (father of Lieutenant John Moyer) company of militia and again a year later, in 1783. Peter Crum lived long enough to file a pension in 1833. It is likely that Van Etten did not know who had been killed (his company was spread over two dozen miles, east to west, along frontier forts in Northampton County) or these men had deserted after the massacre and returned to their farms.

The number commonly believed, 15, is not sustainable according to the evidence. Thus the plaque at the site listing that many names is inaccurate.

=== Captain Daniel Klader ===
Rogan Moore asserts that a Captain Daniel Klader commanded a detachment of 41 men at Sugarloaf. However, Thomas Verenna asserts that no historical evidence exists which places a man named Daniel Klader at the scene. No correspondence or militia returns mention his name. No birth record, marriage record, or death record for him exists. No survivor mentions his name or his death in their depositions and no surviving pension file from any of the Volunteers indicate that they served under a Daniel Klader of any kind.

== See also ==
- Sullivan Expedition
- Battle of Wyoming
- Cherry Valley massacre
- Penn's Creek massacre
