= Luzerne County Fresh Air Camp =

- U.S. National Register of Historic Places
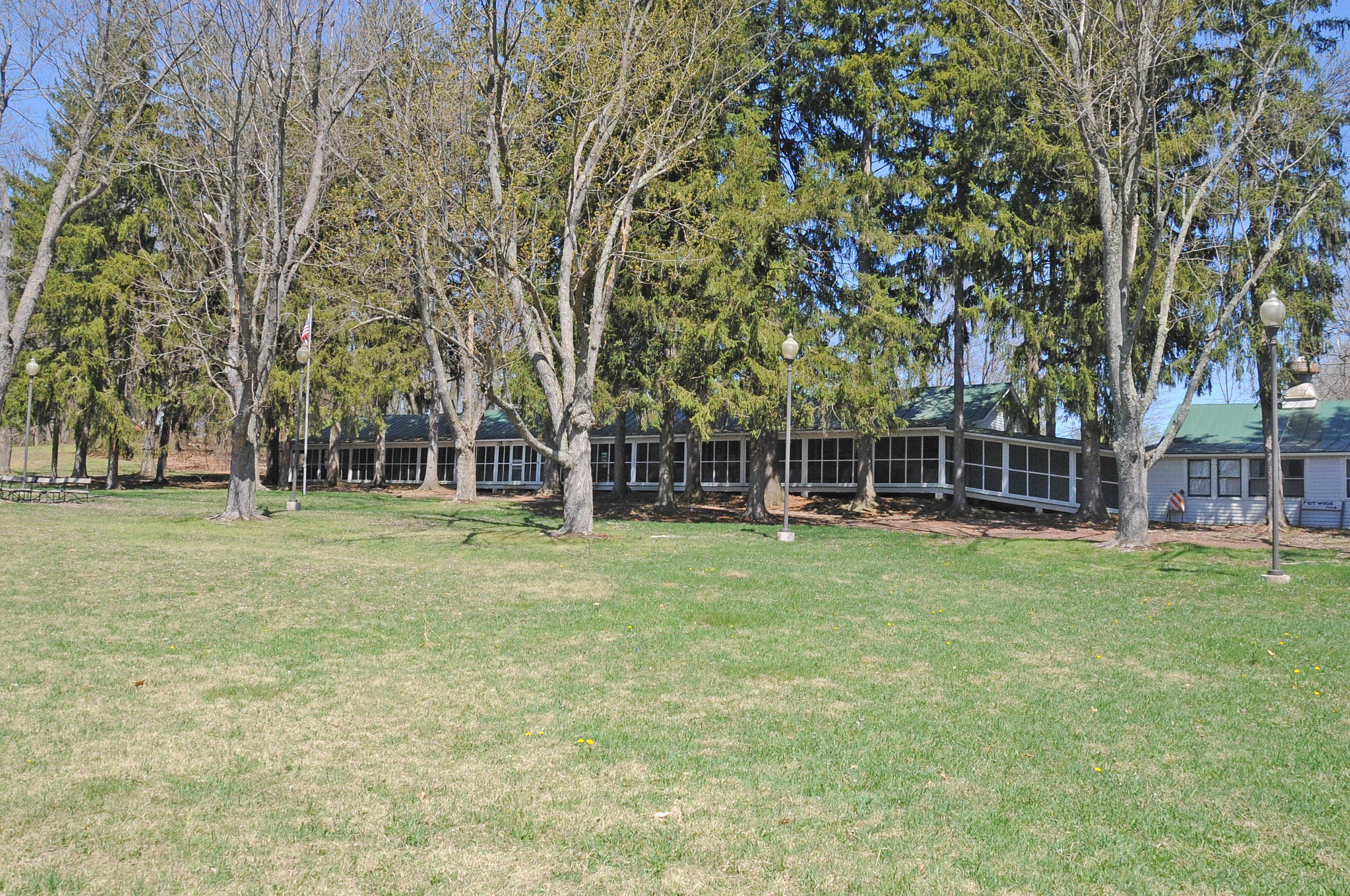
- Dormitory

- Location within Pennsylvania Location within the United States
- Location: Middle Rd., approx. 0.25 mi. NE of jct. of Middle Rd. and PA 3021, Butler Township, Pennsylvania
- Coordinates: 41°00′46″N 75°59′46″W
- Area: 17.8 acres (7.2 ha)
- NRHP reference No.: 04000064
- Added to NRHP: February 20, 2004

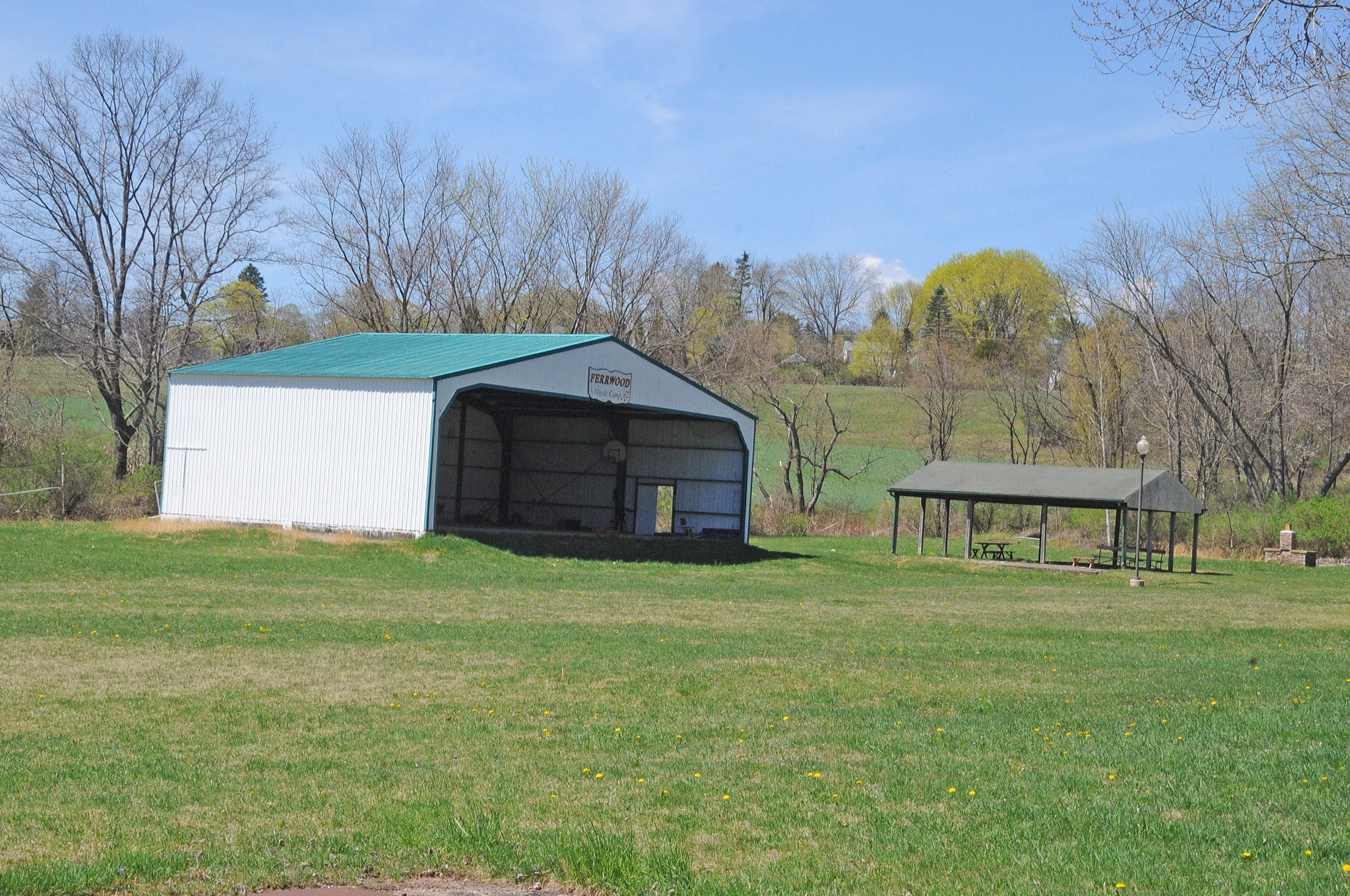
Modern buildings at the camp

The Luzerne County Fresh Air Camp, also known as the Ferrwood Music Camp, is an historic fresh air camp which is located in Butler Township, Luzerne County, Pennsylvania.

The camp was added to the National Register of Historic Places in 2004.

== History and architectural features ==
The historic buildings and structure are a dormitory (1927), dining room / kitchen (c. 1935), and wood frame pump house (1927). It originally operated as a camp for undernourished children predisposed to tuberculosis. The Ferrwood Music Camp, operated by the Greater Hazleton Philharmonic Society, opened in 1969. The camp is currently run by the CAN DO Community Foundation.
