= Beech Mountain Lakes, Pennsylvania =

Unincorporated community in Pennsylvania, US

Beech Mountain Lakes
- Census-designated place
- Location in Pennsylvania Location in the United States
- Coordinates: 41°2′36″N 75°55′51″W
- Country: United States
- State: Pennsylvania
- County: Luzerne
- Township: Butler

Area
  - Total: 1.78 sq mi (4.62 km^{2})
  - Land: 1.55 sq mi (4.02 km^{2})
  - Water: 0.23 sq mi (0.60 km^{2})

Population (2020)
  - Total: 2,157
  - Density: 1,388.8/sq mi (536.22/km^{2})
- Time zone: UTC-5 (Eastern (EST))
  - Summer (DST): UTC-4 (EDT)
- Area code: 570
- FIPS code: 42-05028

Beech Mountain Lakes is a census-designated place (CDP) in Butler Township, Luzerne County, Pennsylvania, United States. As of the 2020 census, Beech Mountain Lakes had a population of 2,157.

== Geography ==
According to the United States Census Bureau, the CDP has a total area of 2.4 square miles (6.2 km^{2}), of which 2.2 square miles (5.6 km^{2}) is land and 0.23 square miles (0.6 km^{2}), or 9.73%, is water. The CDP consists of a housing development adjacent to an artificial lake in the valley of Nescopeck Creek. I-80 passes just north of the CDP. Exit 262 on I-80 serves Pennsylvania Route 309, which runs past the western edge of the CDP.

== Demographics ==
Historical population
Census	Pop.	Note	%±
2010	2,022		—
2020	2,157		6.7%
U.S. Decennial Census

The 2020 United States census gave the population as 2,157 people.

== Education ==
The school district is the Hazleton Area School District.
