= Kis-Lyn School for Boys =

Coordinates: 41°00′20″N 75°59′13″W

Kis-Lyn School for Boys was a reform school that was located in Butler Township, Luzerne County, Pennsylvania. It operated from 1912 to 1965.

== History ==
This school offered a full, high school-level curriculum, and housed boys who had committed non-violent offenses. The students lived in cottages that were run by married couples who were responsible for overseeing the boys when they were not in school or performing chores. Each cottage specialized in different projects on the farm: one cottage handled laundry while others handled farm chores, the dairy barn, the kitchen, and the hen house, respectively.

The boys slept in dormitory style conditions and ate at communal tables. Much of the food provided was raised on the farm. A typical breakfast consisted of hot cereal fortified with raisins, hot rolls and fresh milk. At lunch and dinner, soups, stews, pasta, meats and fresh fruit were served.

Students who adhered to the school's conduct code were allowed visitors once per month and were allowed to leave the farm with their parents or sponsors for the day. They were also allowed to bring back personal items, such as candy, peanut butter and other edible items. During the summer, each cottage was allowed to use the pool, as well as to play baseball or other sports. In winter, during school time, the boys played basketball, staged talent shows and plays, or joined the Boy Scouts. They were also allowed to watch television and were occasionally taken to e circus and other events outside of the facility.

The average stay at Kis-Lyn was one year with some boys being released earlier when proper homes were found for them or when their home lives stabilized. Many of the students at Kis-Lyn were there because of poor living conditions at home; others were there because they had shoplifted or committed other minor offenses.

The school was open to boys of all races and religions with boys coming from all over the state of Pennsylvania including the urban areas of Philadelphia, Reading, Harrisburg, and Pittsburgh. For most boys it was their first exposure to any type of farm life.
