= Conyngham, Pennsylvania =

Borough in Pennsylvania, US

- Borough
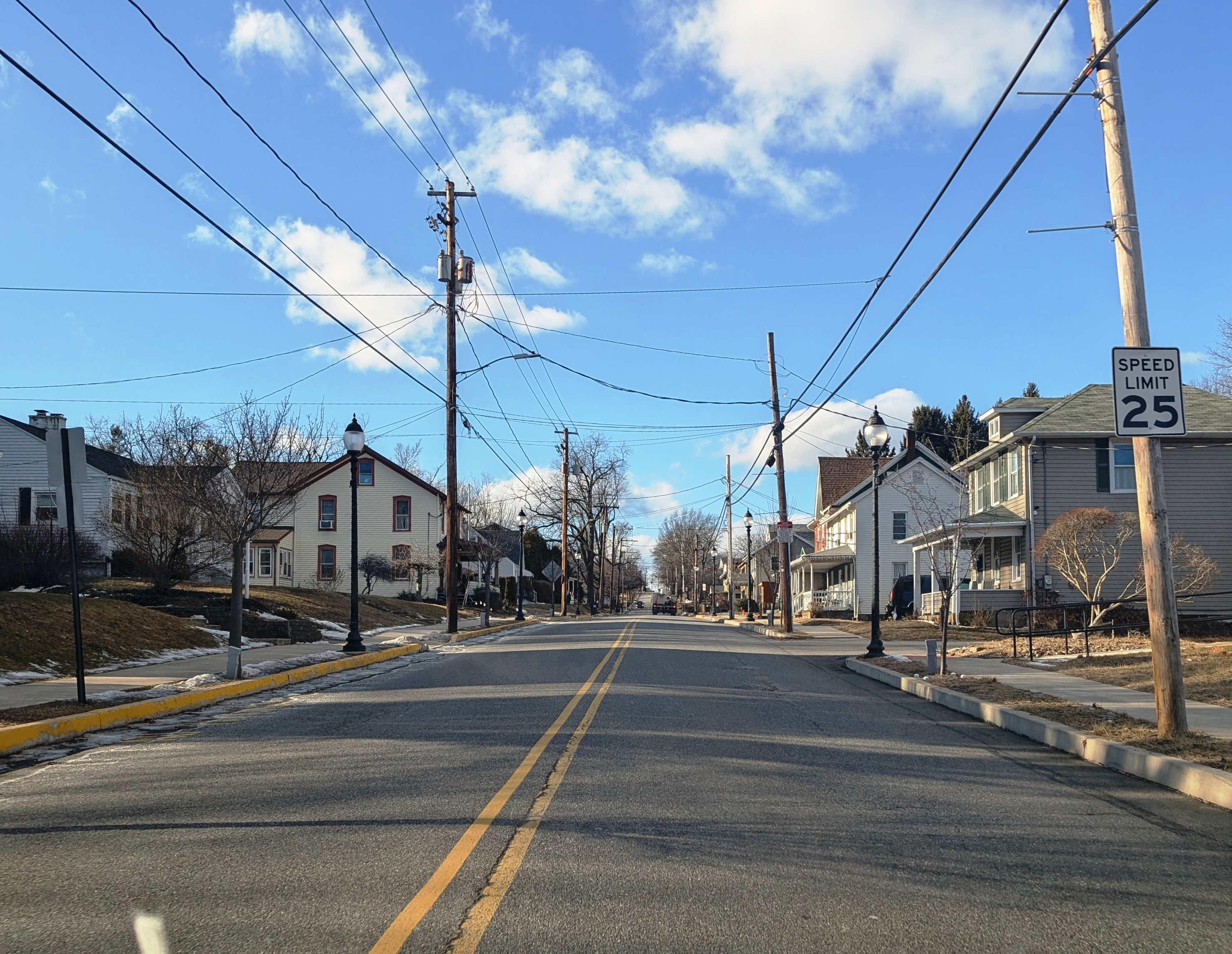
- Main Street, Conyngham

- Location of Conyngham in Luzerne County, Pennsylvania.

- Location within Pennsylvania Location within the United States
- Coordinates: 40°59′24″N 76°03′42″W
- Country: United States
- State: Pennsylvania
- County: Luzerne
- Settled: late 1700s
- Incorporated: 1921

Government
  - Type: Borough Council
  - Mayor: Tricia Marnell

Area
  - Total: 1.03 sq mi (2.66 km^{2})
  - Land: 1.03 sq mi (2.66 km^{2})
  - Water: 0 sq mi (0.00 km^{2})
- Elevation: 1,014 ft (309 m)

Population (2020)
  - Total: 1,825
  - Density: 1,779.5/sq mi (687.08/km^{2})
- Time zone: UTC-5 (Eastern (EST))
  - Summer (DST): UTC-4 (EDT)
- Zip code: 18219
- Area code: 570
- FIPS code: 42-15888
- Website: www.conynghamborough.org

Conyngham is a borough in Luzerne County, Pennsylvania, United States. The population was 1,820 at the 2020 census.

== History ==
The first settler of Conyngham was George Drum (in the late 1700s) who served in the American Revolution and was elected justice of the peace in 1811. George Drum was an entrepreneurial businessman and was a large landowner who also owned the Drums Hotel, a shoe shop, tavern, and the Drums Post Office. He and his family developed the adjacent village of Drums, of which the village is named after the family, along with helping the development of Conyngham. Drums is a sister village to Conyngham. The George Drum residence remains standing in impeccable condition on Conyngham's Main Street.

The Sugarloaf Massacre of September 11, 1780, was one of a series of bloody engagements fought in the frontier of northeastern Pennsylvania between Iroquois (allies of British troops) and settlers loyal to the cause of American independence. Today, this event is commemorated by a historic monument with a bronze plaque bearing the names of the fifteen men who lost their lives near modern-day Conyngham.

In 1815, Redmond Conyngham represented Luzerne County in the Pennsylvania House of Representatives. In 1820, he served a term in the State Senate. Captain Gustavus Conyngham was his cousin. He was an unsung hero of the Revolution. He commanded a privateer and was the first to carry the American flag in the English Channel. The townspeople suggested naming the village after Redmond Conyngham, but he replied that the town should be named in honor of his cousin, Gustavus, who frequently made trips to England to obtain military supplies for revolutionary colonists.

In the 1800s, the Lehigh-Susquehanna Turnpike traveled through the middle of modern-day Main Street in Conyngham. PA 93 was later constructed as another route through the town. It was not until 1921 when Conyngham became a borough.

== Geography ==
According to the United States Census Bureau, the borough has a total area of 1.0 square mile (2.6 km^{2}), all land. Sugarloaf Township encircles Conyngham. Pennsylvania Route 93 runs through the borough. Conyngham is located near Interstate 80 (to the north) and 81 (to the south and east).

=== Attractions ===
Conyngham has a town park called Whispering Willows. At the park, there is a community pool owned by the Conyngham Valley Civic Organization (CVCO). The Hazleton Area Library, Conyngham Branch, is also located nearby. The borough is also home to a museum.

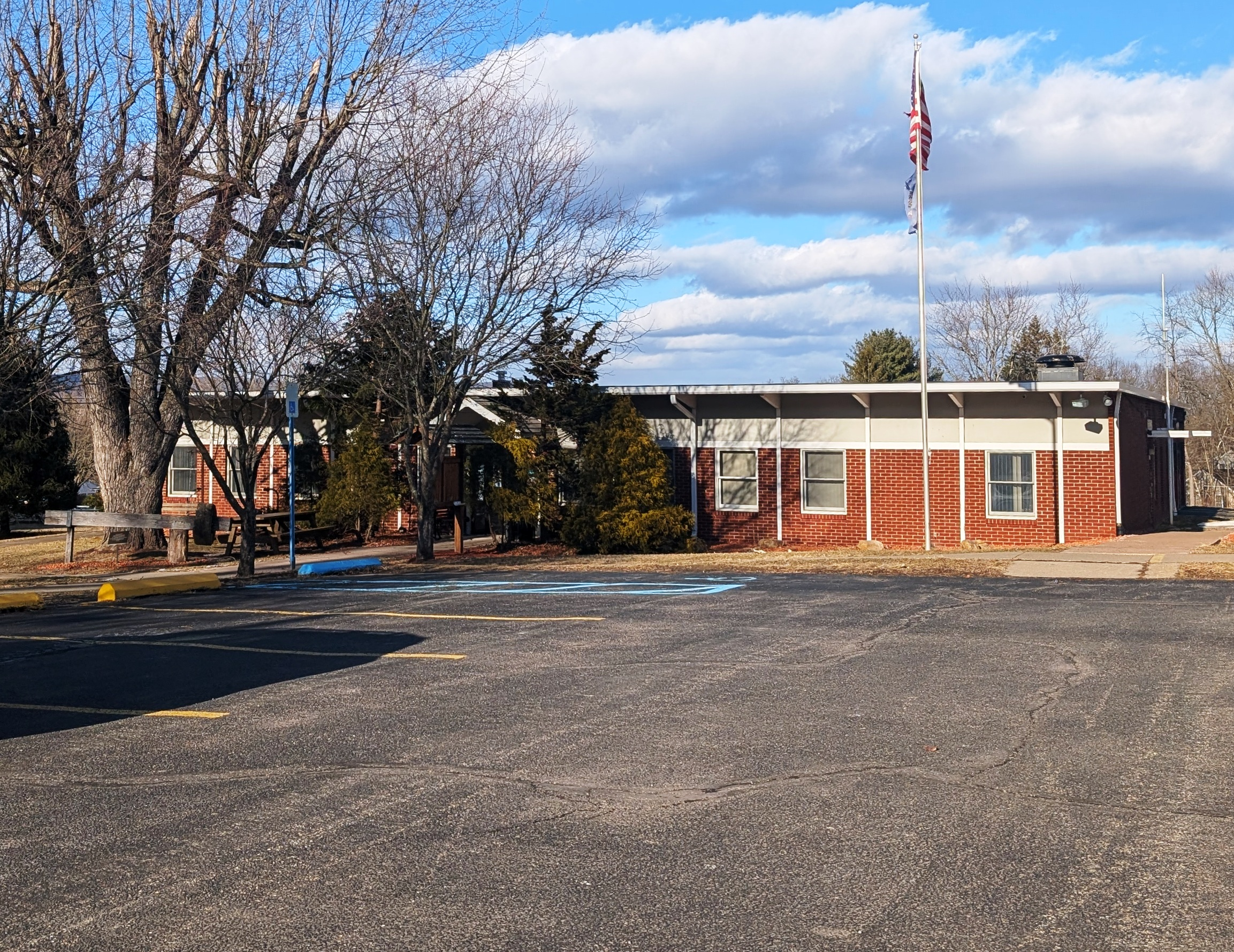
Municipal building

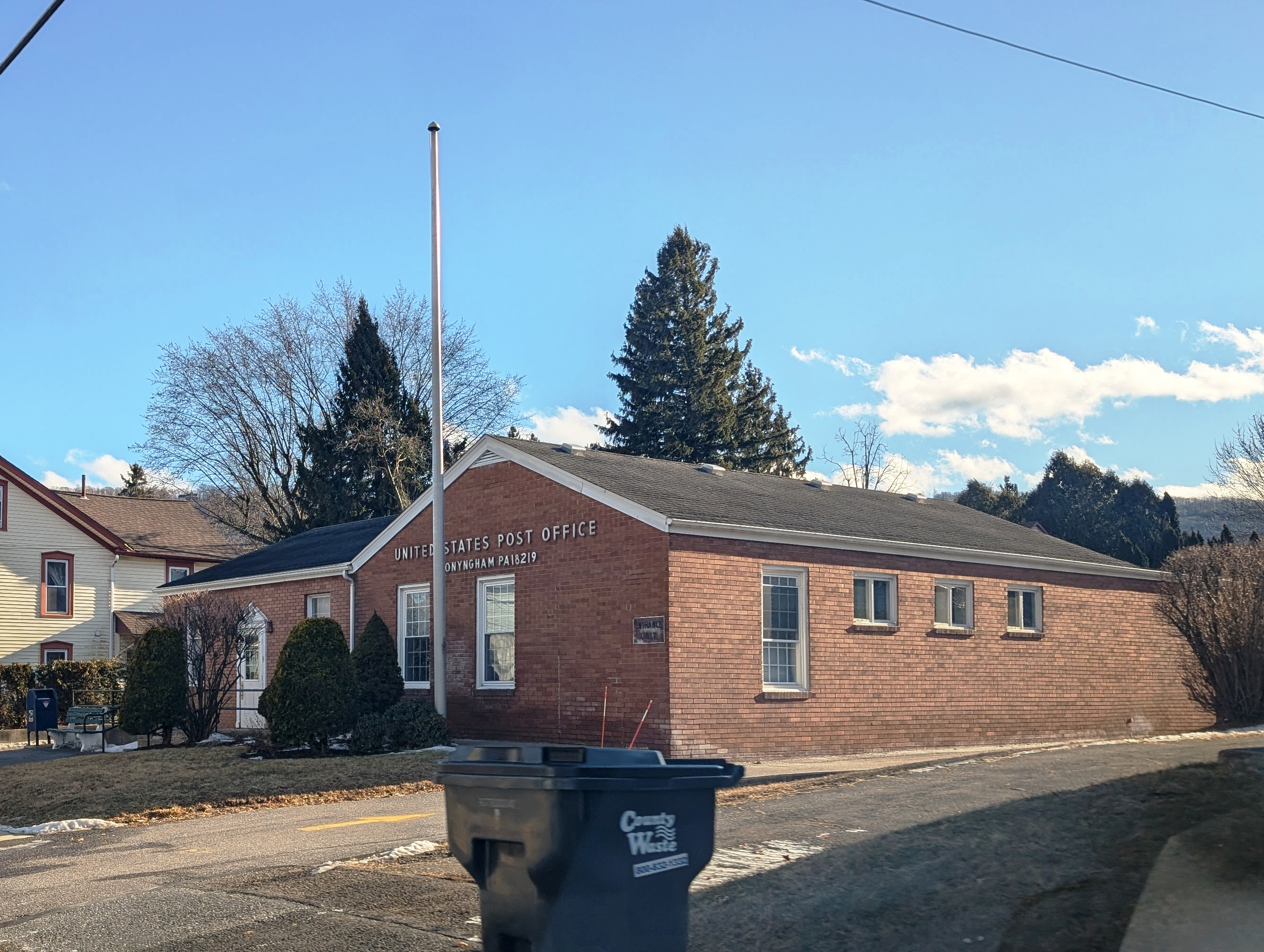
Post office

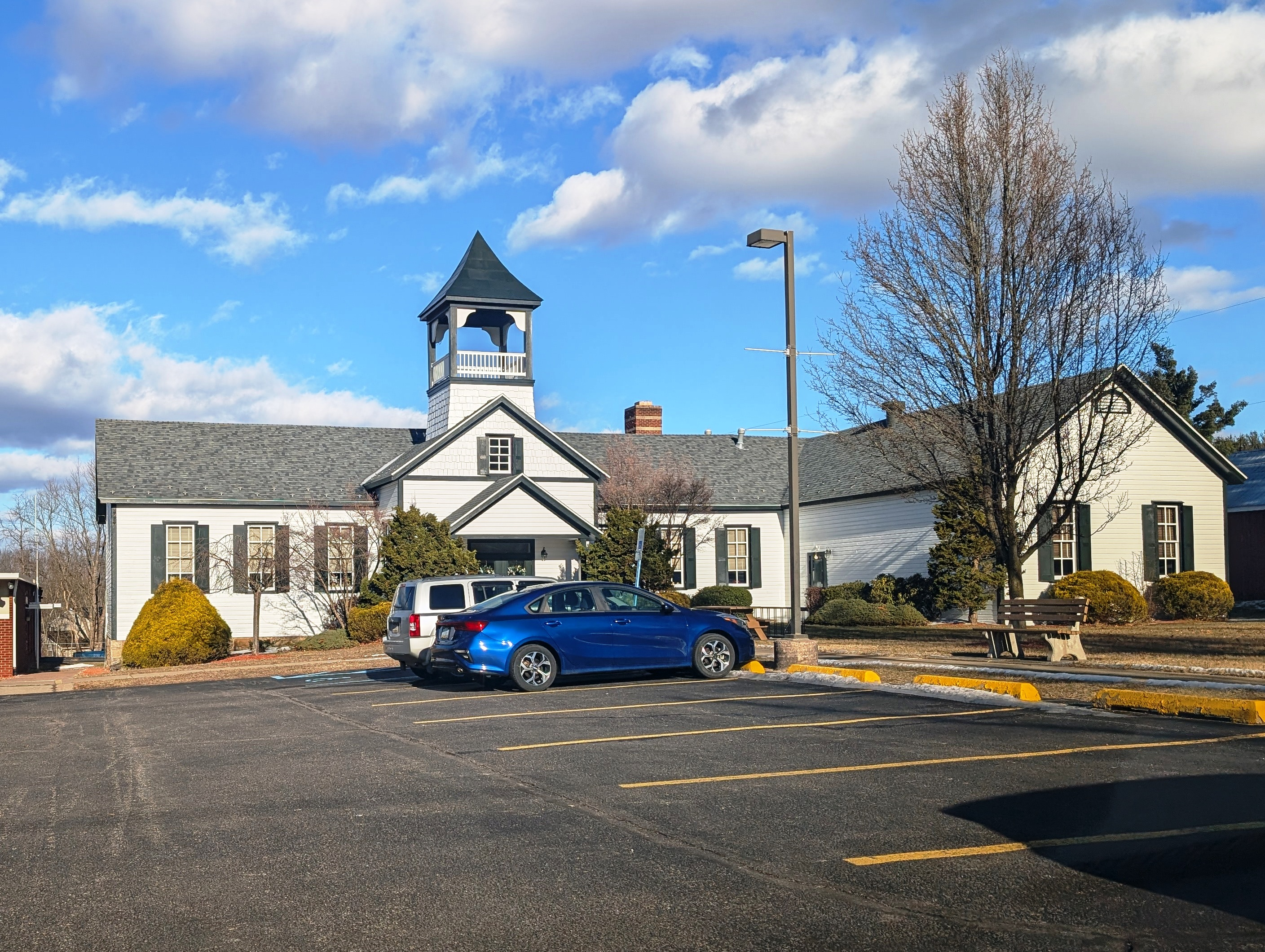
Library in Conyngham

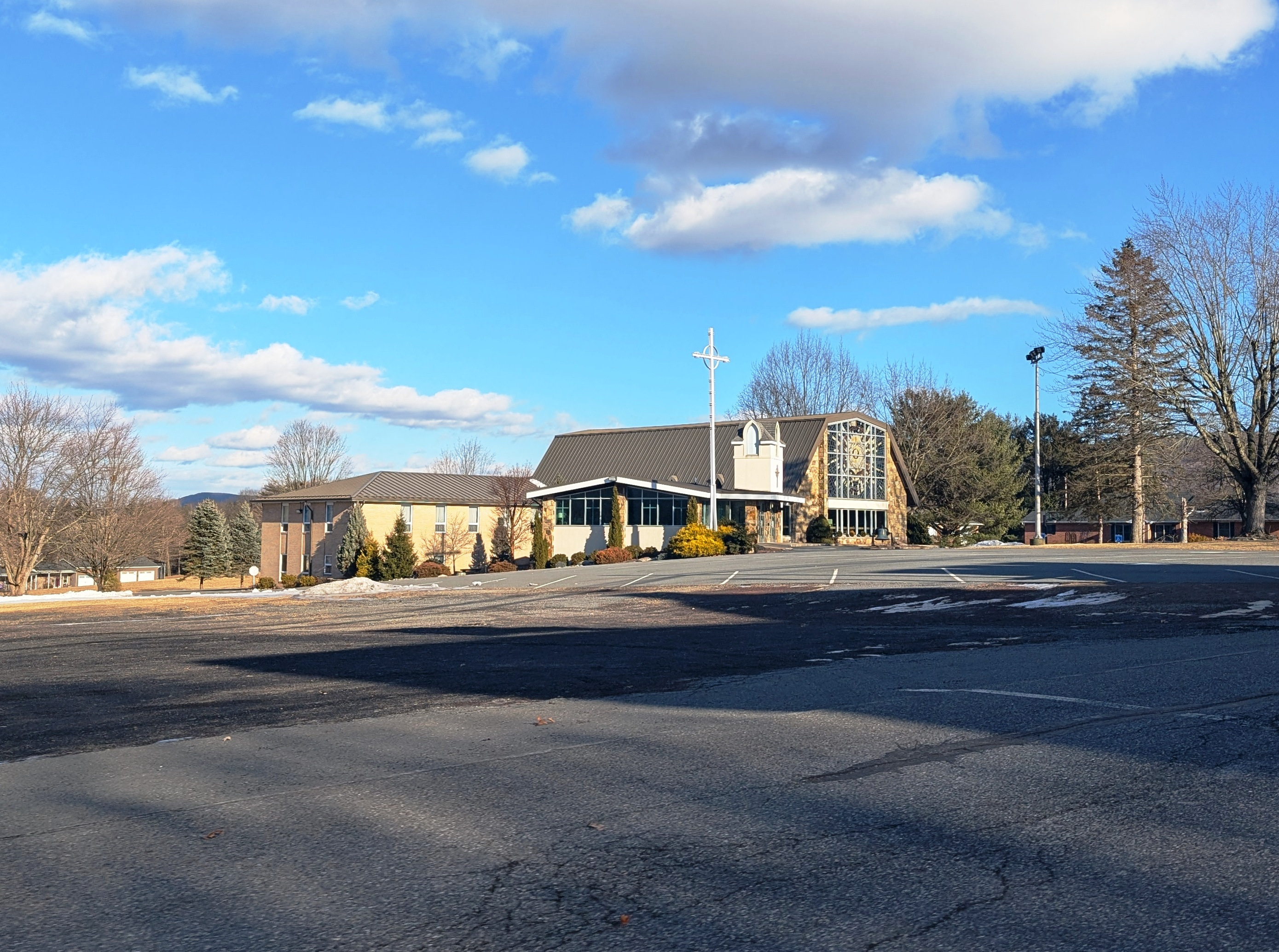
Church in Conyngham

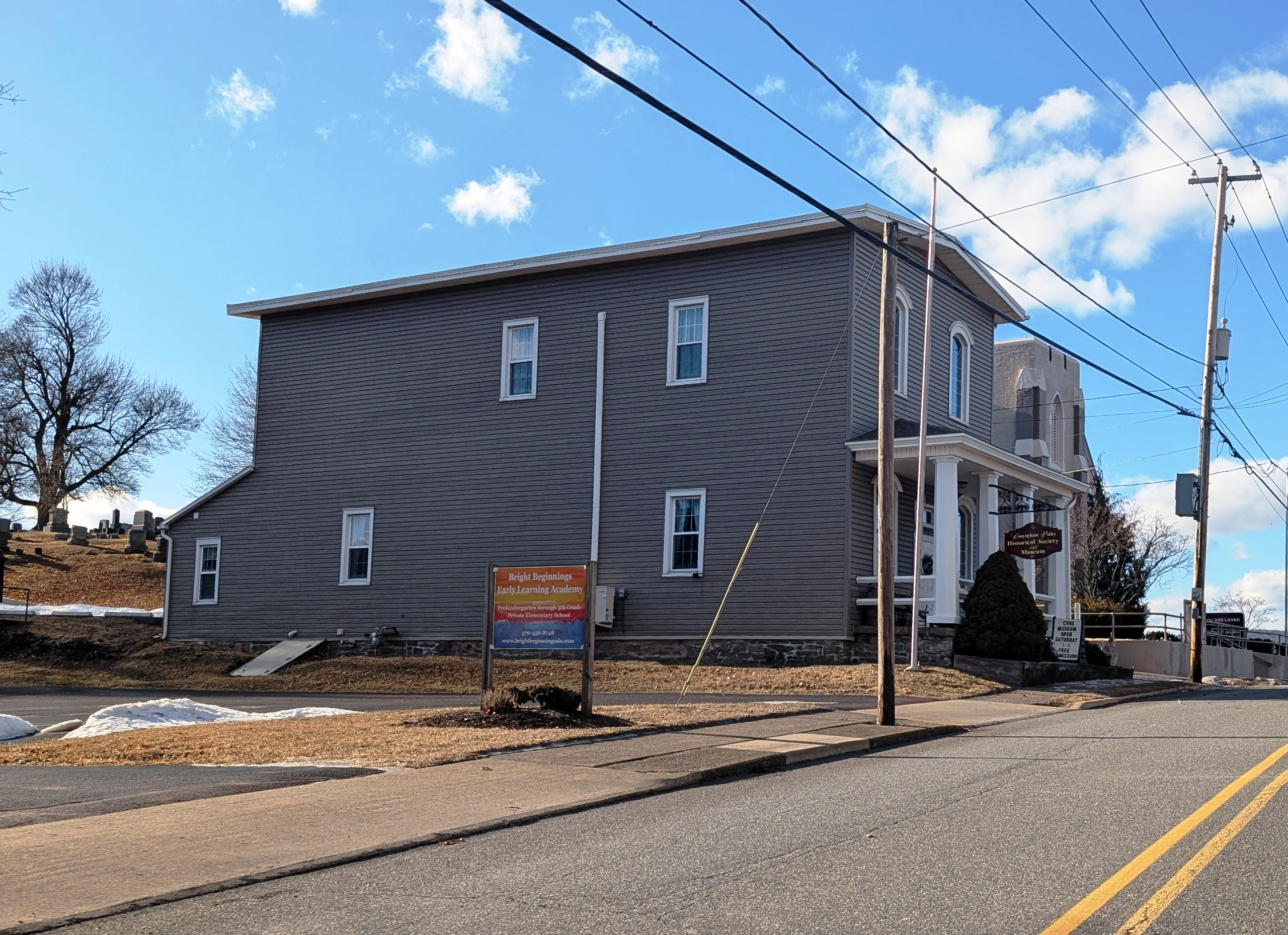
Historial society and museum in the borough

== Demographics ==
Historical population
Census	Pop.	Note	%±
1910	406		—
1920	385		−5.2%
1930	522		35.6%
1940	744		42.5%
1950	935		25.7%
1960	1,163		24.4%
1970	1,850		59.1%
1980	2,242		21.2%
1990	2,060		−8.1%
2000	1,958		−5.0%
2010	1,914		−2.2%
2020	1,825		−4.6%
2021 (est.)	1,818	▼	−0.4%

As of the census of 2000, there were 1,958 people, 793 households, and 574 families residing in the borough. The population density was 1,834.8 inhabitants per square mile (708.4/km^{2}). There were 817 housing units at an average density of 765.6 per square mile (295.6/km^{2}).

The racial makeup of the borough was 97.40% White, 0.05% African American, 2.25% Asian, and 0.31% from two or more races. Hispanic or Latino of any race were 0.72% of the population.

There were 793 households, out of which 30.3% had children under the age of 18 living with them, 61.9% were married couples living together, 8.8% had a female householder with no husband present, and 27.5% were non-families. 23.8% of all households were made up of individuals, and 14.1% had someone living alone who was 65 years of age or older. The average household size was 2.47 and the average family size was 2.95.

In the borough the population was spread out, with 24.0% under the age of 18, 5.5% from 18 to 24, 23.8% from 25 to 44, 28.1% from 45 to 64, and 18.6% who were 65 years of age or older. The median age was 43 years. For every 100 females there were 89.7 males. For every 100 females age 18 and over, there were 84.6 males.

The median income for a household in the borough was $48,529, and the median income for a family was $59,083. Males had a median income of $49,732 versus $22,226 for females. The per capita income for the borough was $26,352. About 2.1% of families and 3.8% of the population were below the poverty line, including 8.1% of those under age 18 and 1.1% of those age 65 or over.

== Education ==
The school district is the Hazleton Area School District.
