= Saint Johns, Pennsylvania =

Unincorporated community in Pennsylvania, US

- Unincorporated community
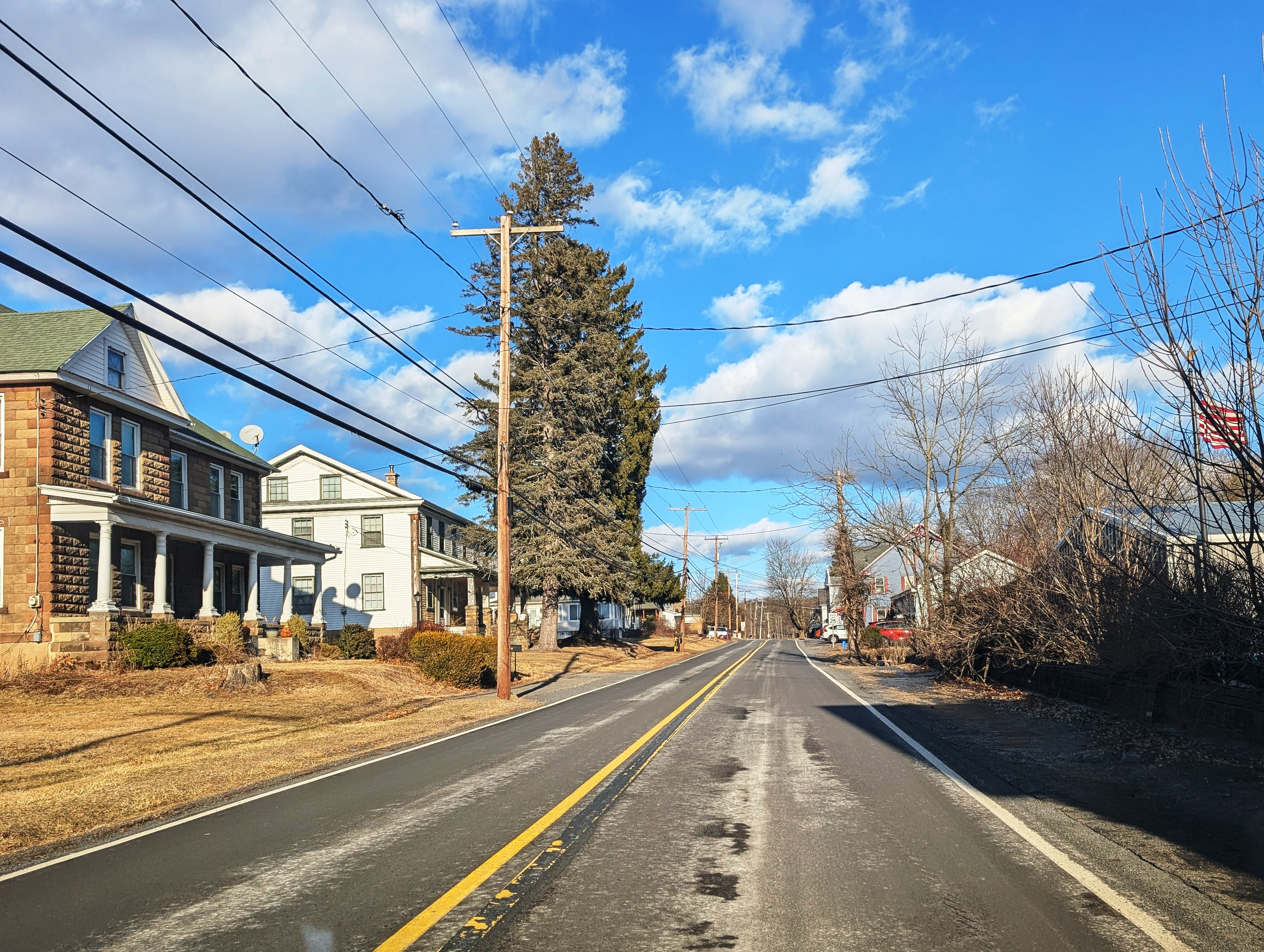
- Eastbound St. Johns Road
- Nicknames: St. Johns, Pennsylvania
- Location within Pennsylvania Location within the United States
- Coordinates: 41°01′41″N 76°00′22″W
- Country: United States
- State: Pennsylvania
- County: Luzerne
- Township: Butler
- Elevation: 971 ft (296 m)
- Time zone: UTC-5 (Eastern (EST))
  - Summer (DST): UTC-4 (EDT)
- ZIP code: 18247
- Area codes: 570 and 272
- GNIS feature ID: 1186054

Saint Johns is an unincorporated community located in Butler Township in Luzerne County, Pennsylvania. Saint Johns is located at the intersection of St. Johns Road and Mill Mountain Road to the north of Hazleton.
