= Butler Township, Luzerne County, Pennsylvania =

Township in Pennsylvania, US

Coordinates: 40°59′30″N 75°59′29″W

- Township
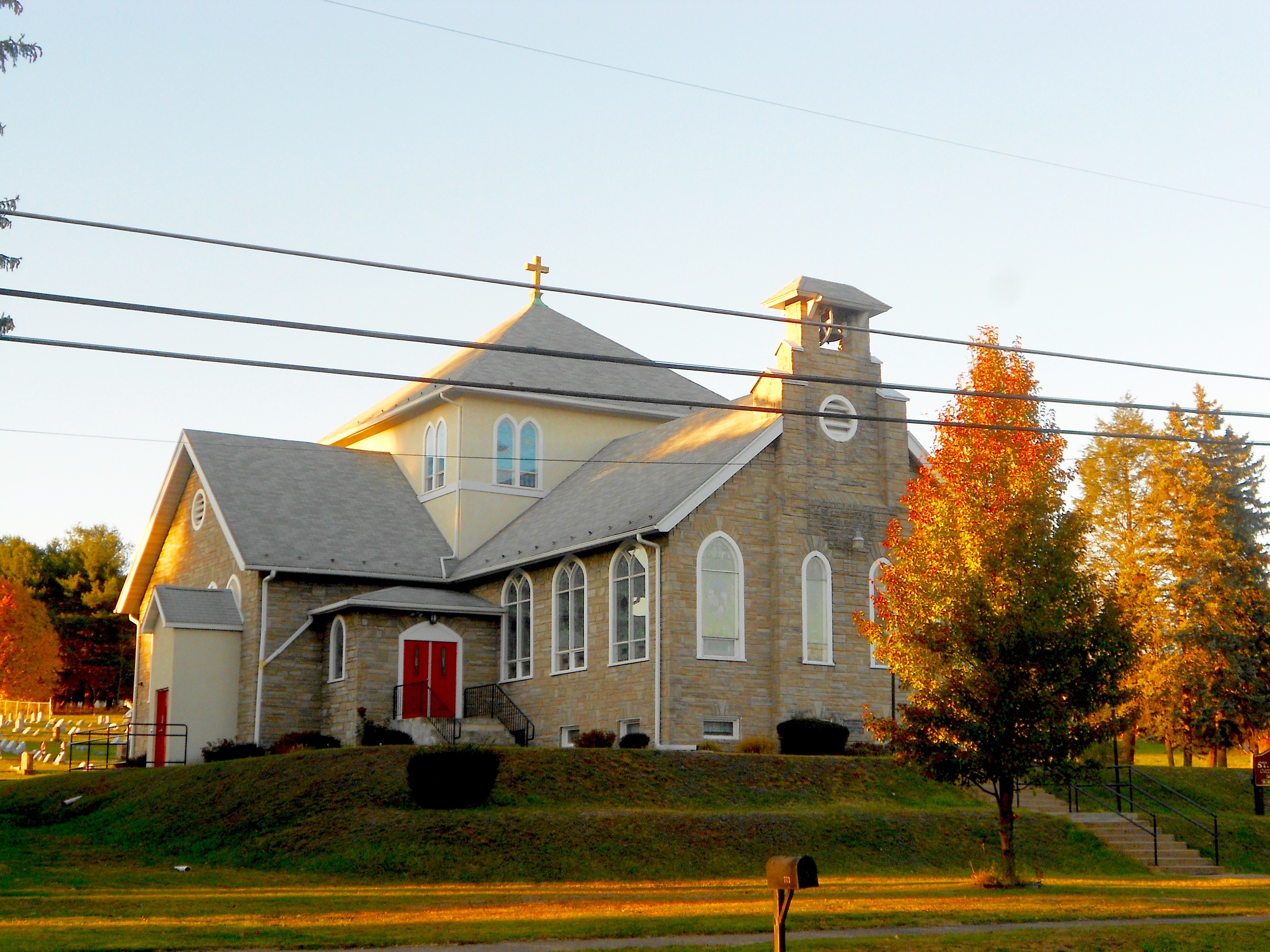
- St. John's United Church of Christ in Butler Township

- Logo

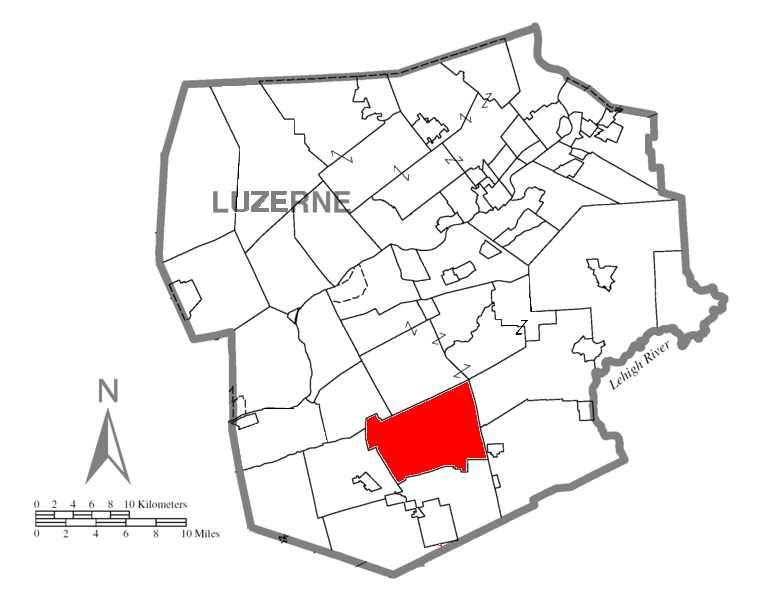
- Map of Luzerne County highlighting Butler Township

- Map of Pennsylvania highlighting Luzerne County
- Country: United States
- State: Pennsylvania
- County: Luzerne

Area
  - Total: 33.61 sq mi (87.06 km^{2})
  - Land: 33.36 sq mi (86.40 km^{2})
  - Water: 0.25 sq mi (0.65 km^{2})

Population (2020)
  - Total: 9,469 ▲
  - Estimate (2021): 9,651
  - Density: 289.0/sq mi (111.59/km^{2})
- Time zone: UTC-5 (Eastern (EST))
  - Summer (DST): UTC-4 (EDT)
- FIPS code: 42-079-10480
- Website: butlertownship.org

Butler Township is a township in Luzerne County, Pennsylvania, United States. The population was 9,469 at the 2020 census.

== History ==
=== Founding ===
An old map of Butler Township

The township is named after Col. Zebulon Butler; he is most famous for his action at the Battle of Wyoming, which resulted in his defeat by British-allied forces. Butler lost 340 men while attacking a superior force of Loyalists and Iroquois. In 1839, Butler Township was formed from a section of Sugarloaf Township. The southern portion of Butler Township was transferred over to Hazle Township in 1861.

=== Drums Village ===
==== 18th century ====
Drums is an unincorporated community in Butler Township. The village was named after the Drum family, whose members developed the village's first school, post office, hotels, churches, roads, and businesses. Family members held positions as pioneers, land developers, justices of the peace, postmasters, school presidents, educators, tailors, shoe makers, hotel proprietors, lawyers, and Pennsylvania state legislators.

In 1738, Philip Drum, aged 36, immigrated to America from Germany with his eight-year-old son Jacob. In 1749, Jacob married Catharine Strauss, who gave birth to a son, George, on June 12, 1762, in Williams Township, Northampton County. According to the 1790 United States Federal Census, George Drum lived in "Allen Township" (now West Bethlehem) during the 1790s before moving his family to the Nescopeck Valley (now Sugarloaf Valley). While in the valley, he established a hotel business and eventually established the towns of Drums and Conyngham.

==== 19th century ====
In 1808, Philip Drum (son of George Sr.) bought land in Luzerne County from Benjamin Rush, who was a close advisor to George Washington during the American Revolutionary War and signed the United States Declaration of Independence. In 1810, Philip established Drums' first carding mill on the Little Nescopeck River. In addition, Philip established the first wool-processing mill in 1835; it was located a short distance from the carding mill. In 1814, George's second son, George Jr. (born October 16, 1792), bought land next to his brother Philip. Philip bought additional land in 1814, 1826, 1836, and 1847. George Sr., George Jr., Philip, and other Drum family members owned vast acreage of land in Drums, Conyngham, and surrounding counties. George Drum's two century old estate still stands in immaculate condition in Conyngham and is a fine example of colonial architecture. George Sr. and George Jr. both died in 1831. On February 27, 1858, Philip died at the age of 71 in Drums, Butler Township.

Further community and land development by family members made Drums and St. Johns the commercial centers of Butler Township. Drums is the principal village of the township.

=== Recent history ===
The Luzerne County Fresh Air Camp was listed on the National Register of Historic Places in 2004.

== Geography ==
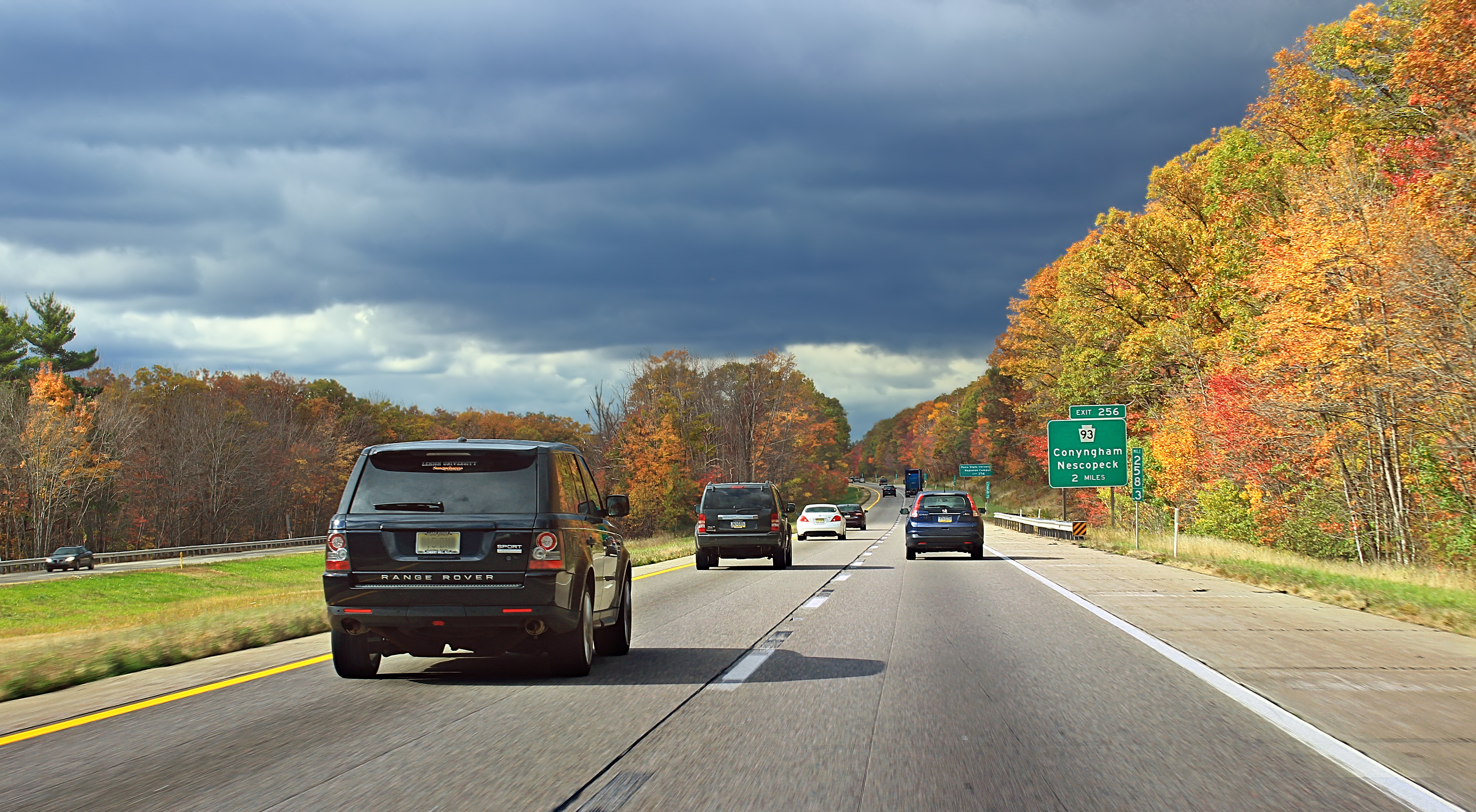
Interstate 80 westbound near Butler

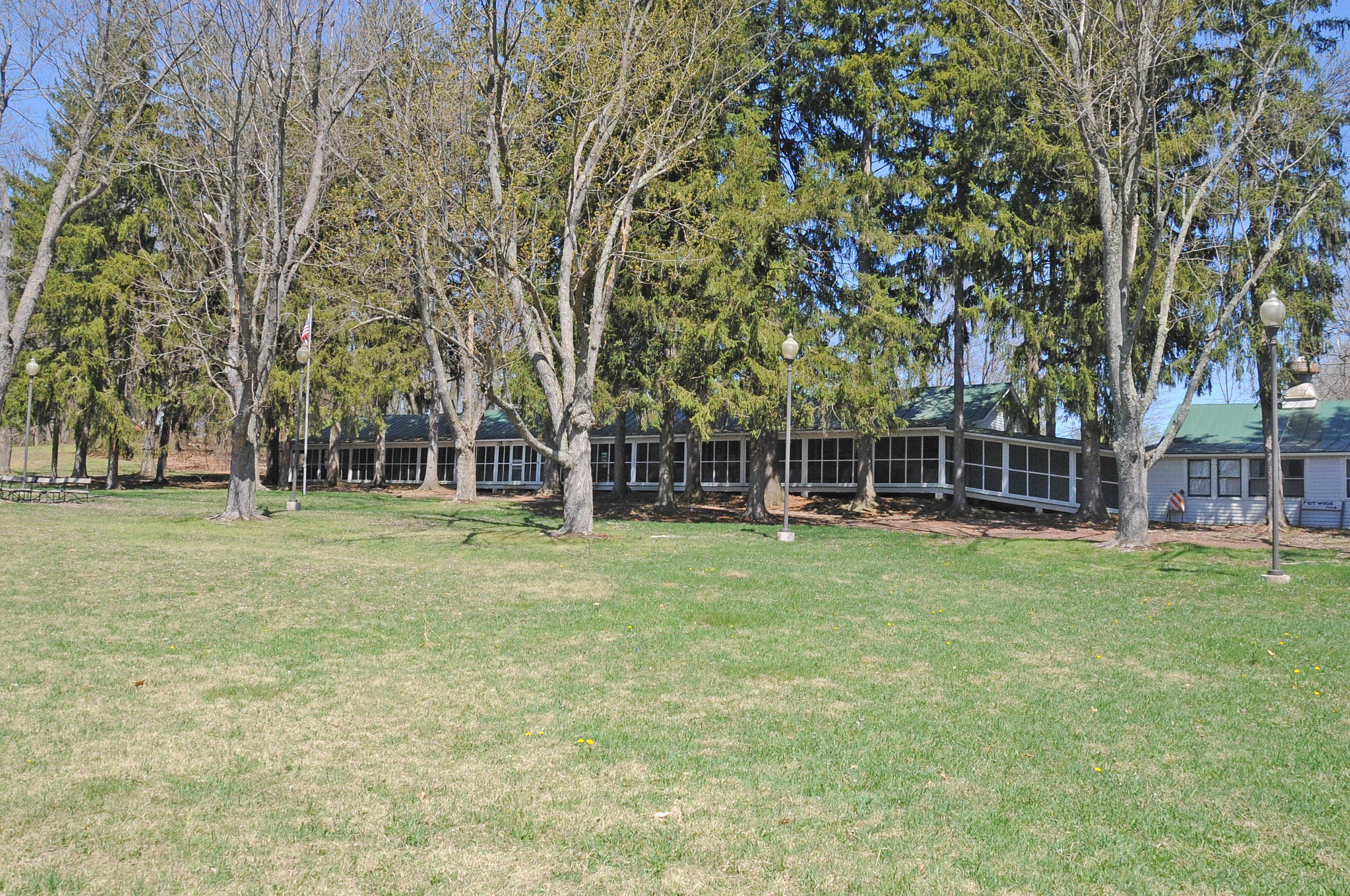
Luzerne County Fresh Air Camp dormitory

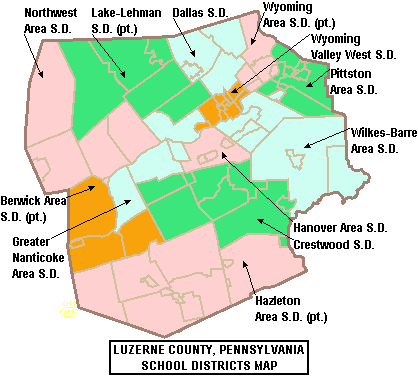
Hazleton Area School District is located in the southern portion of Luzerne County.

According to the United States Census Bureau, the township has a total area of 33.6 square miles (87.1 km^{2}), of which 33.4 square miles (86.4 km^{2}) is land and 0.27 square miles (0.7 km^{2}), or 0.75%, is water. It is drained by Nescopeck Creek westward into the Susquehanna River. Lake of the Four Seasons is a body of water located in the eastern portion of the township.

Butler Township is a mostly rural community consisting of farmland and forests. It is located mainly in the Sugarloaf Valley between Nescopeck Mountain to the north and Buck Mountain to the south. Its villages include Beech Mountain Lakes, Drums, Edgewood, Kis-Lyn, Nescopeck Pass (also in Dorrance Township), St. Johns, and Sand Spring.

=== Climate ===
Butler Township has a warm-summer humid continental climate (Dfb) and the hardiness zone is 6a. Average monthly temperatures in St. Johns range from 25.4 °F in January to 70.8 °F in July.

=== Transportation ===
- I-80 and I-81 intersect in Butler Township.
- PA 309 also passes through the community.

=== Education ===
Hazleton Area School District operates public schools in the township. They include:

- Drums Elementary-Middle School
- Hazleton Area Academy of Sciences in Drums

Hazleton Area High School in Hazle Township is the zoned high school for all Butler Township residents.

=== Neighboring municipalities ===
- Dorrance Township (north)
- Wright Township (tangent to the northeast)
- Dennison Township (east)
- Foster Township (east)
- Hazle Township (south)
- Sugarloaf Township (west)
- Hollenback Township (northwest)

== Weather ==
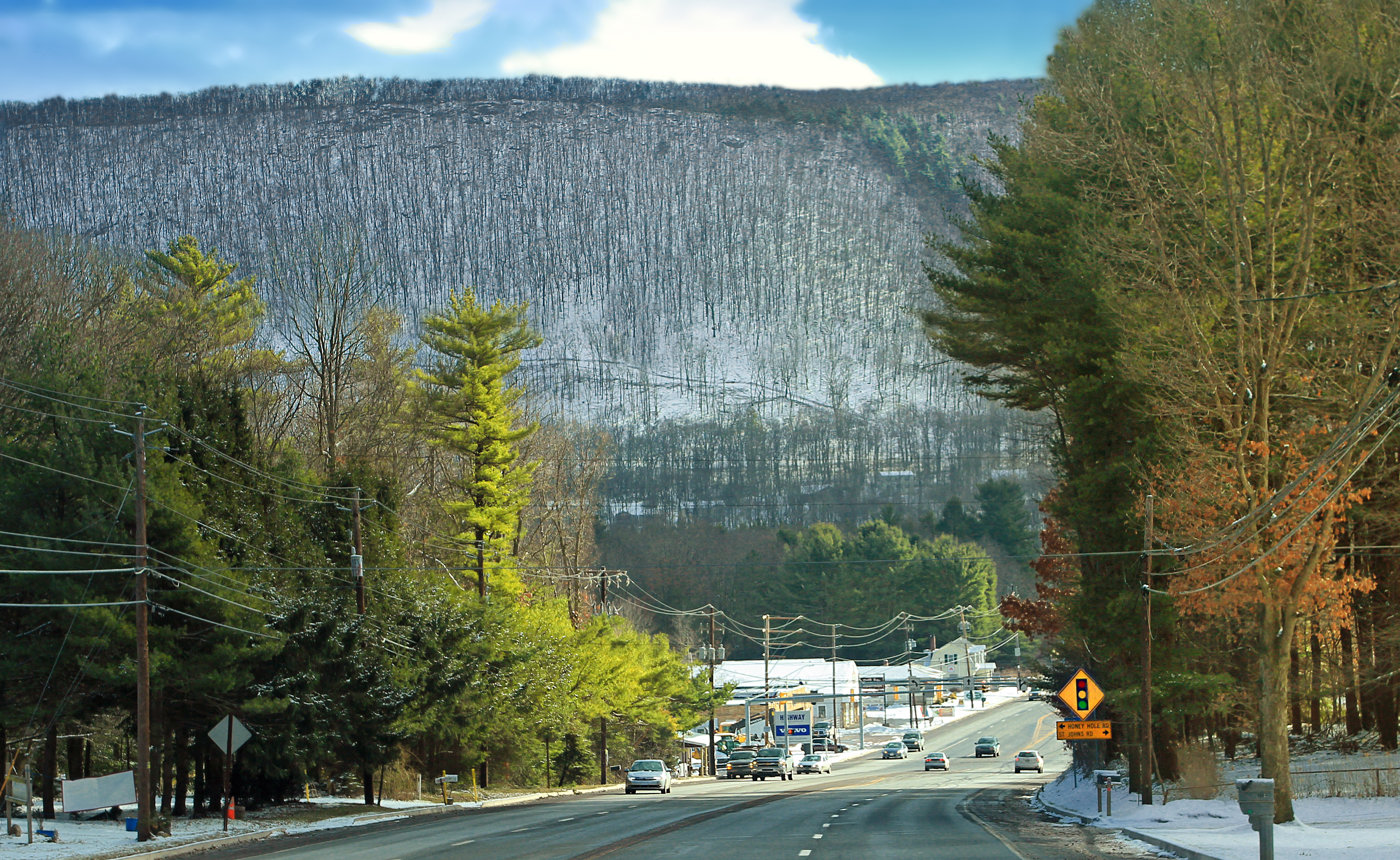
Butler Township during winter

=== 2005 Butler Township weather summary ===
- Highest recorded temperature: 98 °F on 8/13/05
- Lowest recorded temperature: −8 °F on 12/14/05
- Yearly precipitation (rain & melted snow): 42.78 inches

=== 2006 weather summary ===
- Highest recorded temperature: 94 °F on 8/1, 8/2, & 8/3/06
- Lowest recorded temperature: 6 °F on 2/19/06
- Yearly precipitation (rain & melted snow): 55.98 inches (12.31 for the month of June alone)

=== 2007 weather summary ===
- Highest recorded temperature: 94 °F on 8/2 & 8/25/07
- Lowest recorded temperature: −1 °F on 2/5/07
- Yearly precipitation (rain & melted snow): 43.96 inches

== Demographics ==
Historical population
Census	Pop.	Note	%±
2000	7,166		—
2010	9,221		28.7%
2020	9,469		2.7%
2021 (est.)	9,651		1.9%

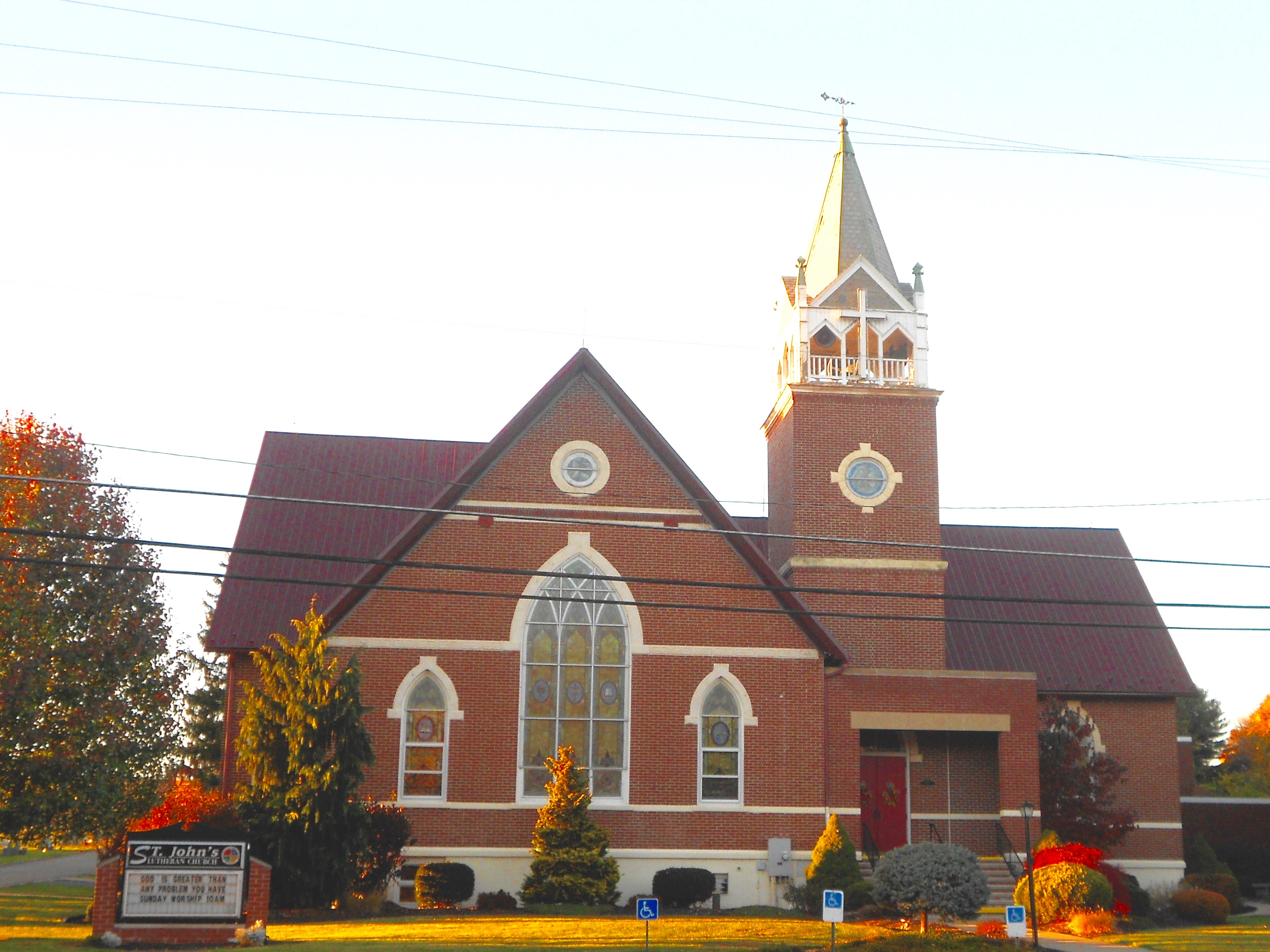
St. John's Lutheran Church in Butler Township

As of the census of 2000, there were 7,166 people, 2,523 households, and 1,899 families residing in the township. The population density was 215.2 inhabitants per square mile (83.1/km^{2}). There were 2,747 housing units at an average density of 82.5 units per square mile (31.9 units/km^{2}). The racial makeup of the township was 92.69% White, 5.67% African American, 0.15% Native American, 0.50% Asian, 0.01% Pacific Islander, 0.39% from other races, and 0.59% from two or more races. Hispanic or Latino of any race were 1.79% of the population.

There were 2,523 households, out of which 32.1% had children under the age of 18 living with them, 64.4% were married couples living together, 7.2% had a female householder with no husband present, and 24.7% were non-families. 20.6% of all households were made up of individuals, and 8.9% had someone living alone who was 65 years of age or older. The average household size was 2.54 and the average family size was 2.93.

In the township the population was spread out, with 23.5% under the age of 18, 9.1% from 18 to 24, 27.3% from 25 to 44, 25.5% from 45 to 64, and 14.6% who were 65 years of age or older. The median age was 39 years. For every 100 females, there were 100.1 males. For every 100 females age 18 and over, there were 97.5 males.

The median income for a household in the township was $46,783, and the median income for a family was $53,958. Males had a median income of $38,926 versus $23,299 for females. The per capita income for the township was $21,020. About 3.2% of families and 10.3% of the population were below the poverty line, including 2.7% of those under age 18 and 6.1% of those age 65 or over.

== Notable people ==
- Nate Eachus, NFL football player
- Jack Palance, film actor

== See also ==
- Angela Park - a former amusement park in Butler Township
