= Drums, Pennsylvania =

Unincorporated community in Pennsylvania, U.S.

- Unincorporated community
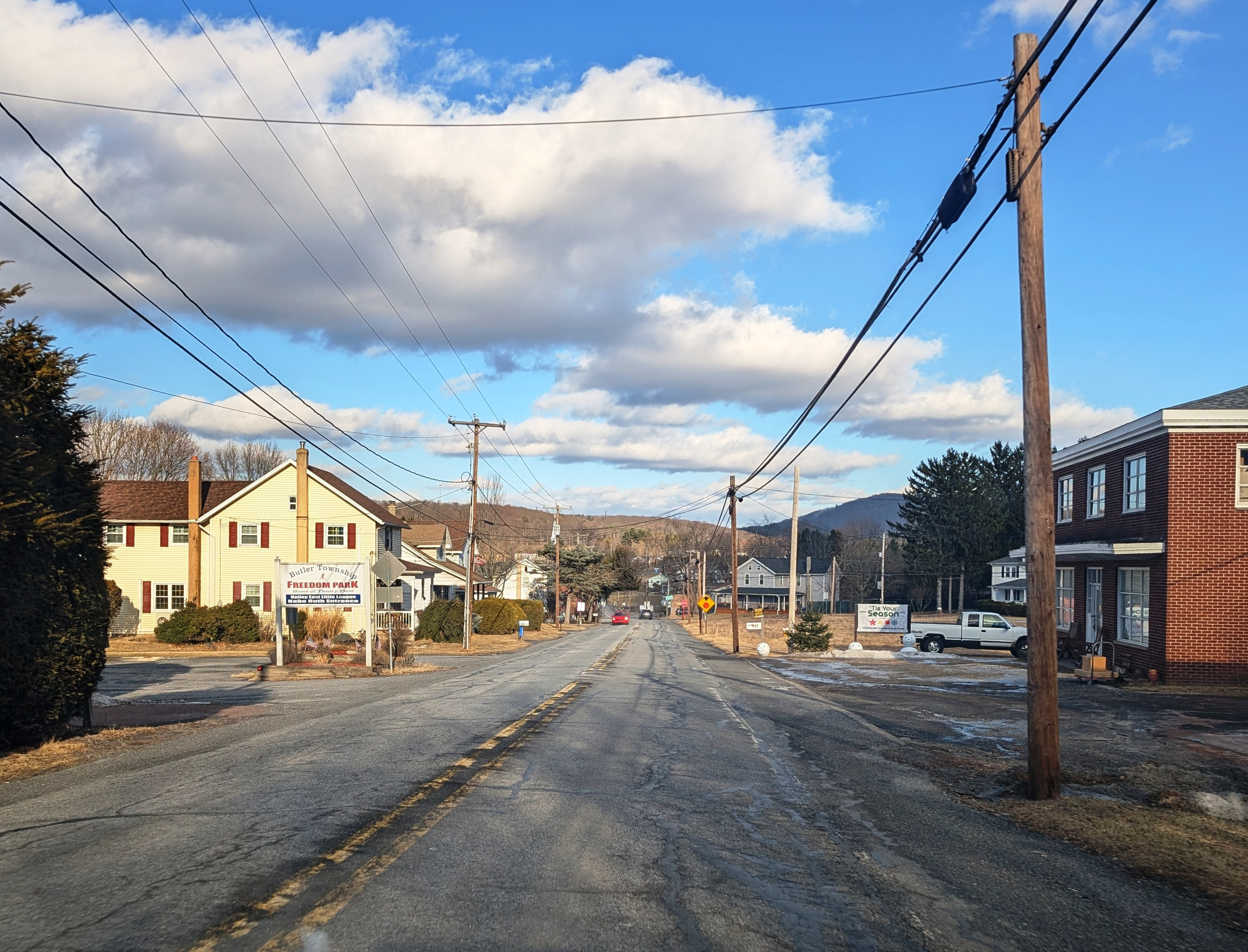
- Eastbound West Butler Drive in Drums

- Location within Pennsylvania Location within the United States
- Coordinates: 41°01′05″N 75°59′42″W
- Country: United States
- State: Pennsylvania
- County: Luzerne
- Township: Butler
- Time zone: UTC-5 (Eastern (EST))
  - Summer (DST): UTC-4 (EDT)
- ZIP code: 18222
- Area codes: 570 and 272
- GNIS feature ID: 1192370

Drums is an unincorporated community in Butler Township, Luzerne County, Pennsylvania. Located about 1,500 feet (460 m) altitude in the Sugarloaf Valley, it is situated east of Interstate 81 and south of Nescopeck Creek, a tributary of the Susquehanna River. Drums was developed by Drum family members beginning in the late 18th century and was originally known as Drum's. Its ZIP Code is 18222, served by the 788 exchange in Area Code 570.

== History ==
=== 18th century ===
The village was originally named "Drum's" by virtue of the creative labor and basic "foundational infrastructure" built by Drum family members which is required for a community settlement. Drum family members were intrinsic to the creation of the village's first church/school, post office, a legal justice system, hotels, churches, roads, and businesses, can rightly be honored as "founders" because, after all is said and done, the settlement was named Drums because of Drum family contributions of their time, labor, and charitable investments for the community. Pioneering family members were farmers, builders, justices, lawyers, postmasters, school presidents, teachers, tailors, shoe makers, Luzerne County sheriff, hotel proprietors, and Pennsylvania county representatives/legislators.

In 1738, Philip Drum, aged 36, immigrated to America from Germany with his eight-year-old son Jacob. In 1749, Jacob married Catharine Strauss, who gave birth to a son, George, on June 12, 1762, in Northampton County, Williams Township, adjacent to Bethlehem and Easton, Pa. This was a revolutionary time in this area because America's founders such as George Washington, Martha Washington, Benjamin Franklin, John Adams and Alexander Hamilton visited Bethlehem numerous times where they lodged at the Moravian Sun Inn before and during the American Revolution. According to the 1790 United States Federal Census, George Drum lived in "Allen Township" (now West Bethlehem) during the 1790s before moving his family to the Nescopeck Valley (now Sugarloaf Valley) to build a house and develop a tavern-hotel business eventually developing Drums and establishing the Drums post office operation with his sons help serving Luzerne County. A 1758 map of "Bethlehem" clearly shows that "Allen Township" was the area of what is now West Bethlehem. George Drum and his family appears to have lived in Allen Township before moving North to help develop the community which became known as Drums and Conygham in Drums Valley.

According to the Drum family legend, tragedy struck the family in 1774 when their farmhouse was attacked by Indians. The Indians killed Jacob and took Catharine. George (age 12) managed to escape harm by hiding in the fireplace. George survived. George was attracted to the beautiful Sugarloaf Valley area in Luzerne County as were other pioneers, such as John Balliet, who is also part of the Drum family tree. George became one of the pioneering settlers there in the late 18th century beginning the development of Drums village and Conyngham. George Drum was the first settler within the village of Conyngham, which is where his estate still stands in impeccable condition after 2 centuries of Drum family ownership .... honorable justice of the peace; Susan (Drum) Walter (GG daughter of George Sr.) became the last known Drum family owner of the (George) Drum family estate up until 1973. Susan lived till the age of 97, becoming the town's oldest resident at that time.

In the late 1700s, George Drum bought land in the Nescopeck Valley (renamed Sugarloaf Valley in 1809) in areas that would become Drums and Conyngham. "Among the early settlers were George Drum, Philip Woodring, Andrew Mowery, and Henry Davis". George Drum was an entrepreneur and government documents indicate he was a carpenter, contractor, builder, farmer, and justice of the peace for Sugarloaf Township. George built the first hotel-tavern in Drums. The original Drums Hotel building still stands in Drums, but is now a privately owned residence in superb condition. The original Drums Post Office building still remains also, but is now a business center still located directly across the road from the Drums Hotel. During the 1960s the post office was moved next to the hotel into a newer brick building. The Drums Post Office operated there up until the early 21st century when it closed after nearly two centuries of service there and moved to a mall where it remains to this day. In addition, and according to church records, George was also an investor/builder consistory council member of St. Johns Church and cemetery founded in 1799. George, his wife, and many other family members are all buried at St. Johns Cemetery. Other family members are buried at Drums Community Cemetery and Conyngham Union Cemetery.

During the American Revolution (1775–83), George joined the Revolutionary War as a private in May 1782 (at age 19) starting with the 6th Company, 4th Battalion in Captain Peter Hay's company under Colonel Philip Boehm in Williams Township, Northampton County. George was eventually promoted and commissioned as Captain of Militia for Frontier Service, 5th Company, Eighth Regiment.

George married Anna Margaret Woodring (born 1765), a daughter of Philip Woodring (a French Huguenot 1741–1819) and Mary Elisabetha Wagner (1743–1829) from Alsace, France. Anna & her family were from the Williams Township, Northampton County area adjacent to Easton and Bethlehem. Anna Margaret descended from an enterprising French/German family line. Her ancestors included town mayors in Alsace that alternatively belonged to France and Germany. Her surname evolved from the French "Vatrin" (pronounced "Vatree" in French) to the German "Wotring" (pronounced "Votring" in German) to the angliczed "Woodring" in America.

=== 19th century ===
In 1808, Philip Drum (son of George Sr.) bought land in Luzerne County from Benjamin Rush, who was a close advisor to George Washington during the American Revolutionary War and signed the United States Declaration of Independence. In 1810, Philip established Drums' first carding mill on the Little Nescopeck River. In addition, Philip established the first wool-processing mill in 1835; it was located a short distance from the carding mill. In 1814, George's second son, George Jr. (born Oct. 16, 1792), bought land next to his brother Philip. Philip bought additional land in 1814, 1826, 1836, and 1847. George Sr., George Jr., Philip, & other Drum family members owned vast acreage of land in Drums, Conyngham, and surrounding counties. George Drum's two century old estate still stands in immaculate condition in Conyngham and is a fine example of colonial architecture. George Sr. and George Jr. both died in 1831. On February 27, 1858, Philip died in Drums, Butler Township, aged 71, he was buried at St. Johns Cemetery. His wool mill passed to his son Jacob.

Further community and land development by family members made Drums and St. Johns the commercial centers of the township. Drums is the principal village in Butler Township. It is in the heart of a rich agricultural section and is on the Old State Road leading to Hazleton, Pennsylvania, and Wilkes-Barre, about six miles from the former, its natural trading point, between Big and Little Nescopeck.

George Drum Sr. was elected justice of the peace for Sugarloaf Township, Luzerne County, in 1811; George Drum Jr. later held the same office, George Sr.'s grandson, George W. Drum, born March 12, 1832, was elected justice of the peace in 1860 for Luzerne County based in the town of Conyngham adjacent to Drums. George W. Drum was elected to the Pennsylvania General Assembly (Pennsylvania legislature) and served from 1879 to 1882. George W. Drum III was also a member and trustee of the German Lutheran Church and trustee of the Conyngham Church and school land lot. Jacob Drum, a son of Philip Drum and namesake of his great-grandfather, Jacob, served as justice of the peace in 1847 and 1852. Jacob's mother was Philip's first wife, Magdalene Beisal, for whom Beisals Road in Drums may be named. Jacob and his wife Susan are buried at St. John's Cemetery and have an obelisk for a gravestone.

William Drum, son of George Sr., established the first post office in Drums in 1826 as postmaster. George Jr. was the postmaster for a time as well during the late 1820s. William Drum also helped organize the Conyngham Post Office as postmaster there in 1828. According to the "Appointments of U.S. Postmasters" register, George Drum (son of Abraham) was appointed on April 28, 1854, as postmaster for the Drums post office during the 1850s. During the 1880s, Abraham Alex Drum (son of Josiah Drum & Maria Balliet) became postmaster. Carrie Drum (grand daughter of Philip the 2nd) was postmistress from the 1890s into the early 1900s. All told, the Drum family personally operated the Drums post office for at least a century. The Drums post office continues to operate but has moved to a local mall.

George Sr's son, Abraham (b. 1797), took over operations of the Drums Hotel in the center of the town and also opened another hotel in the mountains named "The Stage Coach Stop". Abraham's son, George Drum (b. Dec. 2, 1827), then became proprietor of the Drums Hotel by the mid 19th century and married Emma Fritzinger. The hotel was passed on to succeeding generations in the family. The Drums Hotel (which operated for over a century) and other family businesses, sat within a triangle of roads that was the commercial heart of Drums called Drums Corner. During the 1850s and until his death in 1862, Abraham Drum was sheriff of Luzerne County.

=== 20th century ===
Philip L. Drum III (b. 1871) was the grandson of Philip Drum and son of Nathan from Drums. He was an alumnus of Lafayette College and a graduate of the University of Pennsylvania. Philip became a popular lawyer and a Pennsylvania state legislator in 1901 and 1902.

The advent of the car required modification of the township's roads. During the 1920s most of the town's roads were paved. In 1929 construction began on the present Route 309 to permit horseless carriages a more gradual incline up Butler Mountain. The automobile offered new business opportunities. Drums and Saint Johns served as the commercial centers of the township for most of its history, but with the advent of automobiles and housing developments, the hub of commercial activity shifted to Route 309 by 1936.

As early as 1923, the Rose Progressive Development Company plotted Drums Manor as a suburban development, but the company was unable to translate its plans into reality. In 1929, however, Mr. Creast from Media, Pennsylvania, successfully developed Stone Croft Manor.

Charles Lindbergh landed twice at Reifenberg Airport, the airport that served Drums and St. Johns, flying The Spirit of St. Louis in 1928 and a Ford Tri-motor in 1931.

In 1938, a group of men organized the Drums Lions Club.

In 1958, Susan (Drum) Walters, great-granddaughter of George Sr., was elected justice of the peace for the Sugarloaf Valley, serving the community until her death in 1973. She was the oldest resident at age 97. From 1811 to 1973 (162 years) the Drum family held office as justices.

In 1962, the Conyngham National Bank opened a branch in Drums. Later, the Conyngham Bank merged with the First Eastern Bank of Wilkes-Barre. Under the capable direction of Frederick Peters, the Drums office of First Eastern expanded with the township with deposits of several millions.

On January 3, 1990, Edward W. Drum was elected Sugarloaf County Chairman for the community's government. Edward died on March 17, 2005, at age 79 bringing an end to nearly two centuries of Drum family governmental leadership.

== City services ==
Drums is served by the Butler Township Police Department, which employs Chief David Pavelko, a sergeant, and five other officers. Fire, rescue and emergency medical services are provided by volunteers from Valley Regional Fire and Rescue, which was formed when Butler Township Fire Company and Conyngham Fire Company merged in 2005.

The city's zoning and code enforcement department issues building permits.

== Schools ==
The pioneers did not overlook the need to educate their children. During the first years, the children's instruction took place at home. They then constructed a log school on the grounds of the Union Church in 1809. As with the church services, instruction was in German. Between 1830 and 1870, Butler Township had constructed eight one-room schoolhouses. The Drums school was moved in 1870 from its original site to a new location on Old Turnpike Road. At that time, the school curriculum was extended to include the 10th-grade level. In 1941, the original wooden Drums school was closed and a larger, brick structure was built across the street. The following year, the small one-room schools were closed and their students bused to the Drums school. The school directors sold the small buildings to the adjoining landowners the same year. The Butler Township Parent-Teacher Association was formed in 1955. In 1966, the Butler Township School District merged with several others to form the Hazleton Area School District. In 2001, the Drums school closed when the new Drums Elementary/Middle School opened just down the road.

Drums Elementary/Middle School is served today by the Hazleton Area School District. In addition to the Drums Elementary Middle School, the Hazleton Area Academy of Sciences (HAAS) is located within Drums, in the CanDo Industrial Park, and opened for the 2013–2014 school year. HAAS is a magnet program that focuses on science, technology, engineering, and mathematics. Drums will also be home to the Hazleton Area Academy of the Arts and Humanities (HAAH) in the near future. The HAAH will also be located within the CanDo Industrial Park, next to the HAAS, in the former Web.com building.

== Churches ==
The Trinity Church project, which George W. Drum donated his land to, organized a Sunday School on May 6, 1844. The president, Isaac Drum, was born in 1820, the son of Jacob Drum. Isaac served in the American Civil War. And other officers included superintendent James Smith; secretary James Hillman; treasurer William Harker; and managers Adam Beisal, Mrs. Beisal, Daniel Durst, Mrs. Yost and Mrs. Hunt. A constitution was adopted August 25, 1844. Around 1880, a new group of officers took control: president Nathan S. Drum (Son of Philip); vice president John S. Spencer; superintendent Cyrus Straw; secretary Abraham Alexander Drum (son of Josiah Drum and Maria Balliet); librarian Mary Jacobs; treasurer Josiah Drum; and managers Cyrus Straw, Henry Gilmore, John Spencer, Mrs. Hedian, Mrs L. Straw and Miss E. Jacobs.

St. John's Church was organized on December 26, 1799. George Drum (the first) was a founding member of the church, invested in its construction, and helped build it. George Drum and Anna Margaret gave birth to a son, Isaac, on Oct. 18, 1799 who died as a child in 1804 and was the first Drum's family members buried at St. John's Cemetery on May 8, 1804. By April 18, 1809, Rev. Frederick Van de Sloat wrote a constitution and by-laws for the government of the congregation. The subscribers to this document were consistory George Drum, John Balliet Sr, Philip Woodring, Jacob Speth, George Wenner, S. Earles, Jacob Balliet, Peter Hill, John Balliet Jr, Peter Scheide, Michael Beishline, Jacob Drumheller, A. Maurer, P. Ruth, J. Fuse, J. Wenner, H. Maurer, George Beishline, and Michael Bitterle. One of the founders, Jacob Drumheller (in the Drum family tree), constructed the first building in what became Hazleton, Pennsylvania, in 1809. Many members of the Drum family have their final resting place at St. John's Cemetery, including the original George Drum Sr. and wife Anna Margaret Woodring; Philip Drum and second wife Magadalena, Jacob Drum and wife Susan Mochamaer, Abraham Drum and wife Magdalene, John Drum and wife Anna Marie, and Isaac Drum. Present day descendants are also buried at St. Johns such as Edward T. Drum (Corporal — Sergeant j in WW II, d. 1995 who is survived by his son; Gary E. Drum, grandchildren; Celeste, Christos, Angelica, and great-grandson Xaeden Andrew-Drum Leo . Edward is the 3rd great-grandson of George Drum Sr.. St. Johns has become the family's primary cemetery for the past 215 years.

Balliet, Beisal, Beishline, Butz, Chapin, Curwood, Drasher, Dreisbach, Drumheller, Eroh, Fink, Fisher, Fritzinger, Gilmore, Greece, Hart, Heller, Helman, Hess, Hughes, Klinger, Lauderbach, Miller, Mochamer, Morgan, Santee, Schleppy, Shearer, Strauss, Straw, Turnbach, Roth, Wagner, Whitenight, Whitebread, Wilkins, Winter, Wolfe, Woodring, Wotring, Yoch, Young, and Zimmerman are some names in the extended Drum family who lived in the Drums area and contributed to the community.

Trinity Methodist Episcopal Church was founded with the building committee team consisting of Rev. Colborn, Stephen Drum (son of Abraham), Cyrus & Andrew Straw, an A. P. Goedecke.

As of 2013, places of worship includes the Drums United Methodist Church, Good Shepherd Church, Christ Reformed Episcopal Church, St. Paul's United Methodist Church and Seventh Day Adventist Church.

== Notable people ==
- Nate Eachus, NFL player.
- Jack Palance, film actor.
