= Reilly Creek =

Physical characteristics
- Source
  - location: a short distance northwest of Bear Creek Junction in Dennison Township, Luzerne County, Pennsylvania
  - elevation: between 1,300 and 1,320 feet (400 and 400 m)
- Mouth
  - location: Creasy Creek in Dennison Township, Luzerne County, Pennsylvania
  - coordinates: 41°05′33″N 75°49′15″W
  - elevation: 1,158 ft (353 m)
- Length: 2.3 mi (3.7 km)

Basin features
- Progression: Creasy Creek → Nescopeck Creek → Susquehanna River → Chesapeake Bay
- Tributaries
  - left: Mill Creek

Reilly Creek is a tributary of Creasy Creek in Luzerne County, Pennsylvania, in the United States. It is approximately 2.3 miles (3.7 km) long and flows through Dennison Township. Reilly Creek has one named tributary, which is known as Mill Creek. The creek is slightly acidic, but has some alkalinity and water hardness. It is relatively unlikely that the creek will experience water pollution. The main rock formations in the vicinity of the creek include the Mauch Chunk Formation and the Pocono Formation. The creek is considered to be a Coldwater Fishery.

== Course ==
Reilly Creek begins a short distance northwest of Bear Creek Junction in Dennison Township. It flows southwest for several tenths of a mile before turning west-southwest for nearly two miles (three kilometers). The creek then turns southwest for a few tenths of a mile and receives the tributary Mill Creek from the left. After receiving this tributary, Reilly Creek turns northwest and after several tenths of a mile reaches its confluence with Creasy Creek.

== Hydrology ==
Reilly Creek is slightly acidic, with a pH of 6.4. The concentration of alkalinity in the creek is 22 milligrams per liter and the concentration of water hardness is 28 milligrams per liter. The specific conductance of the creek's waters is 97 micromhos.

The DRASTIC score for the upper reaches of the Nescopeck Creek watershed, where Reilly Creek is located, ranges between 69 and 90. This indicates a relatively low probability of water pollution.

== Geography and geology ==
The elevation near the mouth of Reilly Creek is 1,158 feet (353 m) above sea level. The elevation of the creek's source is between 1,300 feet (400 m) and 1,320 feet (400 m) above sea level.

Reilly Creek is considerably shorter than its tributary, Mill Creek.

Rock of the Mauch Chunk Formation (which contains the most productive aquifers in the area of Nescopeck Creek) and the Pocono Formation occurs in or near the watershed of Reilly Creek. Several water wells are in the vicinity of the watershed.

== Watershed ==
The mouth of Reilly Creek is in the United States Geological Survey quadrangle of White Haven, as is the source of the creek. The watershed of the creek is in the northeastern part of the watershed of Nescopeck Creek. Adjacent watersheds include those of Mill Creek and Creasy Creek.

There are only a few miles of local roads in the watershed of Reilly Creek. There are even fewer state roads in the watershed of the creek. The creek is one of six streams in the upper Nescopeck Creek watershed to have considerably more than 80 percent forest coverage.

== History ==
Reilly Creek was entered into the Geographic Names Information System on August 2, 1979. Its identifier in the Geographic Names Information System is 1184879 and it is described as a "2 mile long tributary of Nescopeck Creek".

The Pennsylvania Fish and Boat Commission has a water quality sampling station on Reilly Creek.

== Biology ==
Reilly Creek is considered by the Pennsylvania Department of Environmental Protection to be a Coldwater Fishery. The creek is the only part of the drainage basin of Creasy Creek that is not considered to be a High-Quality Coldwater Fishery and Class A Wild Trout Waters.

== See also ==
- List of rivers of Pennsylvania
