= Mill Creek (Reilly Creek tributary) =

Physical characteristics
- Source
  - location: Dennison Township, Luzerne County, Pennsylvania, not far from the community of White Haven, Pennsylvania
  - elevation: between 1,320 and 1,340 feet (400 and 410 m)
- Mouth
  - location: Reilly Creek in Dennison Township, Luzerne County, Pennsylvania
  - coordinates: 41°05′30″N 75°49′05″W
  - elevation: 1,168 ft (356 m)
- Length: 2.8 mi (4.5 km)

Basin features
- Progression: Reilly Creek → Creasy Creek → Nescopeck Creek → Susquehanna River → Chesapeake Bay
- Tributaries
  - left: one unnamed tributary

Mill Creek is a tributary of Reilly Creek in Luzerne County, Pennsylvania, in the United States. It is approximately 2.8 miles (4.5 km) long and flows through Dennison Township. The creek flows through a number of ponds, at least one of which has a dam. There are relatively few roads in the watershed of the creek and the significant majority of the watershed is forested land. The creek is named, but has not been assessed.

== Course ==
Mill Creek begins in southeastern Dennison Township, not far from the community of White Haven. It flows north-northwest for a short distance before turning west-northwest for more than a mile, passing through a large pond and then a much smaller pond. The creek eventually turns abruptly north for a few tenths of a mile and then turns north-northwest, passing through Bryants Pond and meandering between Pine Mountain and Maple Ridge. A short distance further downstream, it reaches its confluence with Reilly Creek.

=== Tributaries ===
Mill Creek was no named tributaries. However, it has one unnamed tributary, which enters the creek from the left.

== Geography and geology ==
The elevation near the mouth of Mill Creek is 1,168 feet (356 m) above sea level. The elevation near the creek's source is between 1,320 feet (400 m) and 1,340 feet (410 m) above sea level. The creek is considerably longer than Reilly Creek, which it is a tributary of.

There are several rock formations in the vicinity of Mill Creek. These include the Mauch Chunk Formation, the Pocono Formation, and the Sherman Creek Member of the Catskill Formation. Additionally, several wells are found in the vicinity of the creek.

A pond with a dam known as the Ray T. Mantz Dam is situated on Mill Creek. The Ray T. Mantz Dam is in the United States Geological Survey quadrangle of White Haven and is not accessible to the public.

== Watershed ==
Both the mouth and the source of Mill Creek are in the United States Geological Survey quadrangle of White Haven. The creek's watershed is in the northeastern part of the watershed of Nescopeck Creek.

There are less than 10 miles (16 km) of state routes in the watershed of Mill Creek. There are only a few miles of local roads in the creek's watershed. The watershed of the creek has less than 80 percent forest coverage. The watershed is adjacent to the watersheds of Reilly Creek and Long Hollow.

== History ==
Mill Creek was added to the Geographic Names Information System on August 2, 1979. Its identifier in the Geographic Names Information System is 1181129.

Mill Creek, along with Reilly Creek, which Mill Creek is a tributary to, is on the list of streams that are named, but are not assessed.
