= Nescopeck =

Nescopeck may refer to the following:

- Nescopeck Mountain, ridge in Columbia County and Luzerne County, in Pennsylvania
- Nescopeck Township, Pennsylvania
  - Nescopeck, Pennsylvania, a borough in the above township
- Nescopeck Creek, a tributary of the Susquehanna River in Luzerne County
- Nescopeck State Park, in Luzerne County
