= Creasy Creek =

Physical characteristics
- Source
  - location: valley in eastern Dennison Township, Luzerne County, Pennsylvania
  - elevation: 1,500 ft (460 m)
- Mouth
  - location: Nescopeck Creek in Dennison Township, Luzerne County, Pennsylvania
  - coordinates: 41°05′15″N 75°50′13″W
  - elevation: 1,105 ft (337 m)
- Length: 4.7 mi (7.6 km)
- Basin size: 7.25 mi^{2} (18.8 km^{2})

Basin features
- Progression: Nescopeck Creek → Susquehanna River → Chesapeake Bay
- Tributaries
  - left: Reilly Creek

Creasy Creek is a tributary of Nescopeck Creek in Luzerne County, Pennsylvania, in the United States. It is approximately 4.7 miles (7.6 km) long and flows through Dennison Township. The watershed of the creek has an area of 7.25 square miles (18.8 km^{2}). The creek ranges from very slightly acidic to very slightly alkaline. It is considered to be a High-Quality Coldwater Fishery (although it was a Coldwater Fishery in the past) and Class A Wild Trout Waters. Creasy Creek has one named tributary and at least one unnamed tributary.

== Course ==
Creasy Creek begins in a valley in eastern Dennison Township. It flows south for a short distance and almost immediately receives an unnamed tributary. It then turns south-southwest for two miles or so before turning west-southwest and then south-southwest. The creek then crosses Pennsylvania Route 437 and turns west, receiving the tributary Reilly Creek. After approximately a mile it turns southwest and after a few tenths of a mile reaches its confluence with Nescopeck Creek at Olympus Pond.

Creasy Creek joins Nescopeck Creek 36.58 miles (58.87 km) upstream of its mouth.

=== Tributaries ===
Creasy Creek has one named tributary. It is known as Reilly Creek. Reilly Creek has its own tributary, which is known as Mill Creek.

== Hydrology ==
The pH of the waters of Creasy Creek ranges from 6.9 to 7.2, making it the only headwater tributary of Nescopeck Creek to have alkaline waters. The total concentration of alkalinity is between 12 and 24 milligrams per liter. The concentration of water hardness ranges between 15 and 24 milligrams per liter. The specific conductance of the creek's waters ranges from 49 to 74 microohms.

== Geography ==
The elevation near the mouth of Creasy Creek is 1,105 feet (337 m) above sea level. The elevation of the creek's source is approximately 1,500 feet (460 m) above sea level.

A small tributary of Creasy Creek experiences erosion near a culvert on it.

== Watershed ==
The watershed of Creasy Creek has an area of 7.25 square miles (18.8 km^{2}). The mouth of the creek is on the United States Geological Survey quadrangle of White Haven. However, the source is on the United States Geological Survey quadrangle of Wilkes-Barre East. The creek's watershed is in the northeastern part of the Nescopeck Creek watershed. The watershed is near the headwaters of Nescopeck Creek.

There are several miles of local roads in the watershed of Creasy Creek. The watershed has an additional one or two miles of state roads. The creek is one of six streams in the upper Nescopeck Creek watershed to have considerably more than 80 percent forest coverage. More than 80 percent of the land within 100 feet (30 m) of Creasy Creek is forested. However, only a few percent is agricultural land and even less is barren land.

There are 5.5 miles (8.9 km) of streams in the watershed of the main stem of Creasy Creek. The watershed of the tributary Reilly Creek contains an additional several miles of streams.

Creasy Creek contributes significantly to the flow of upper Nescopeck Creek, making it somewhat easier to canoe on Nescopeck Creek downstream of Creasy Creek than upstream of it.

== History ==
Creasy Creek was entered into the Geographic Names Information System on August 2, 1979. Its identifier in the Geographic Names Information System is 1172666.

Creasy Creek was studied in the Nescopeck Creek Watershed Stewardship Report in 2002.

Creasy Creek was historically designated as a Coldwater Fishery. However, in 2012 the Pennsylvania Fish and Boat Commission requested that it, along with approximately 50 other streams in Pennsylvania, be upgraded to a High-Quality Coldwater Fishery.

== Biology ==
Wild trout naturally reproduce on Creasy Creek between its headwaters and its mouth. Creasy Creek is considered to be a Coldwater Fishery and a High-Quality Coldwater Fishery. It is also considered to be Class A Wild Trout Waters. The creek is inhabited by brook trout.

== See also ==
- Little Nescopeck Creek A, next tributary of Nescopeck Creek going downstream
- List of rivers of Pennsylvania
