= Kester Creek =

Physical characteristics
- Source
  - location: southern base of Nescopeck Mountain in Sugarloaf Township, Luzerne County, Pennsylvania
  - elevation: between 1,040 and 1,060 feet (320 and 320 m)
- Mouth
  - location: Nescopeck Creek in Sugarloaf Township, Luzerne County, Pennsylvania
  - coordinates: 41°00′17″N 76°06′29″W
  - elevation: 755 ft (230 m)
- Length: 1.4 mi (2.3 km)

Basin features
- Progression: Nescopeck Creek → Susquehanna River → Chesapeake Bay

Kester Creek is a tributary of Nescopeck Creek in Luzerne County, Pennsylvania, in the United States. It is approximately 1.4 miles (2.3 km) long and flows through Sugarloaf Township. The creek is considered by the Pennsylvania Fish and Boat Commission to be Class A Wild Trout Waters. A bridge has been constructed across the creek at least once.

== Course ==
Kester Creek begins at the southern base of Nescopeck Mountain in Sugarloaf Township. It flows south for a short distance, crossing Interstate 80, before turning southwest and entering a valley. After a few tenths of a mile, the creek turns south, then east, and then south again. After several tenths of a mile, it crosses Cedar Head Road and continues flowing south. A short distance further downstream, the creek reaches its confluence with Nescopeck Creek.

== Hydrology, geography and geology ==
The mouth of Kester Creek has an elevation of 755 feet (230 m) above sea level. The elevation of the creek's source is between 1,040 and 1,060 feet (320 and 320 m) above sea level.

The concentration of alkalinity in the waters of Kester Creek is 24 milligrams per liter.

== Watershed ==
Kester Creek is entirely within the United States Geological Survey quadrangle of Sybertsville.

== History ==
Kester Creek was entered into the Geographic Names Information System on August 1, 1989. Its identifier in the Geographic Names Information System is 1212441. The creek was entered because it appeared on county highway mas published by the Pennsylvania Department of Transportation.

A bridge carrying LR 4012 over Kester Creek was planned by Schupack and Zollman and approved by the Pennsylvania Department of Transportation in 1961. It was to be situated on a road running from Pecora's Dairy to Tank. A 22-foot-long bridge over the creek was slated for destruction in 1970. As of 1970, the bridge crossing the creek is a two-lane bridge.

== Biology ==
A section of Kester Creek from river mile 1.1 downstream to the creek's mouth is considered by the Pennsylvania Fish and Boat Commission to be Class A Wild Trout Waters for brook trout. Wild trout naturally reproduce in the creek from its headwaters downstream to its mouth.

== See also ==
- Black Creek (Nescopeck Creek), next tributary of Nescopeck Creek going downstream
- Little Nescopeck Creek, next tributary of Nescopeck Creek going upstream
- List of rivers of Pennsylvania
