= Walker Run =

Walker Run Beach Haven Creek
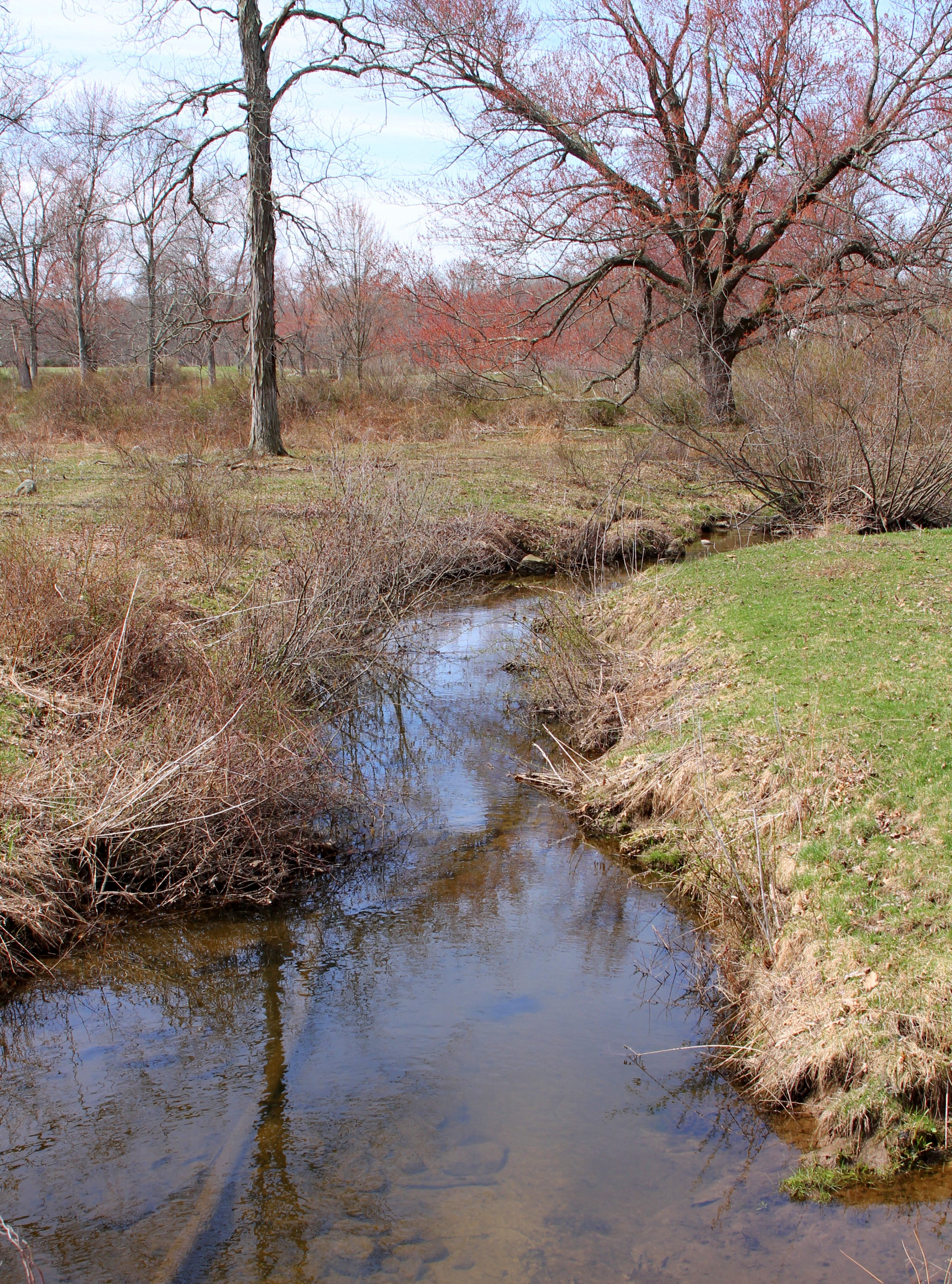
- Walker Run looking downstream

Physical characteristics
- Source
  - location: near State Route 4002 in Salem Township, Luzerne County, Pennsylvania
  - elevation: between 820 and 840 feet (250 and 260 m)
- Mouth
  - location: Susquehanna River in Salem Township, Luzerne County, Pennsylvania
  - coordinates: 41°03′59″N 76°10′48″W
  - elevation: 489 ft (149 m)
- Length: 4.4 mi (7.1 km)
- Basin size: 3.83 sq mi (9.9 km^{2})
- Discharge
  - average: 660 cu ft/s (19 m^{3}/s) 10 percent probability for peak annual discharge at mouth

Basin features
- Progression: Susquehanna River → Chesapeake Bay
- Tributaries
  - left: one unnamed tributary
  - right: two unnamed tributaries

Walker Run (also known as Beach Haven Creek) is a tributary of the Susquehanna River in Luzerne County, Pennsylvania, in the United States. It is approximately 4.4 miles (7.1 km) long and flows through Salem Township. The watershed of the stream has an area of 3.83 square miles (9.9 km^{2}). There are three unnamed tributaries. The stream is on rock of the Mahantango Formation, the Harrell Formation, the Irish Valley Member, and the Trimmers Rock Formation. A number of roads cross the stream. It is inhabited by wild trout.

== Course ==
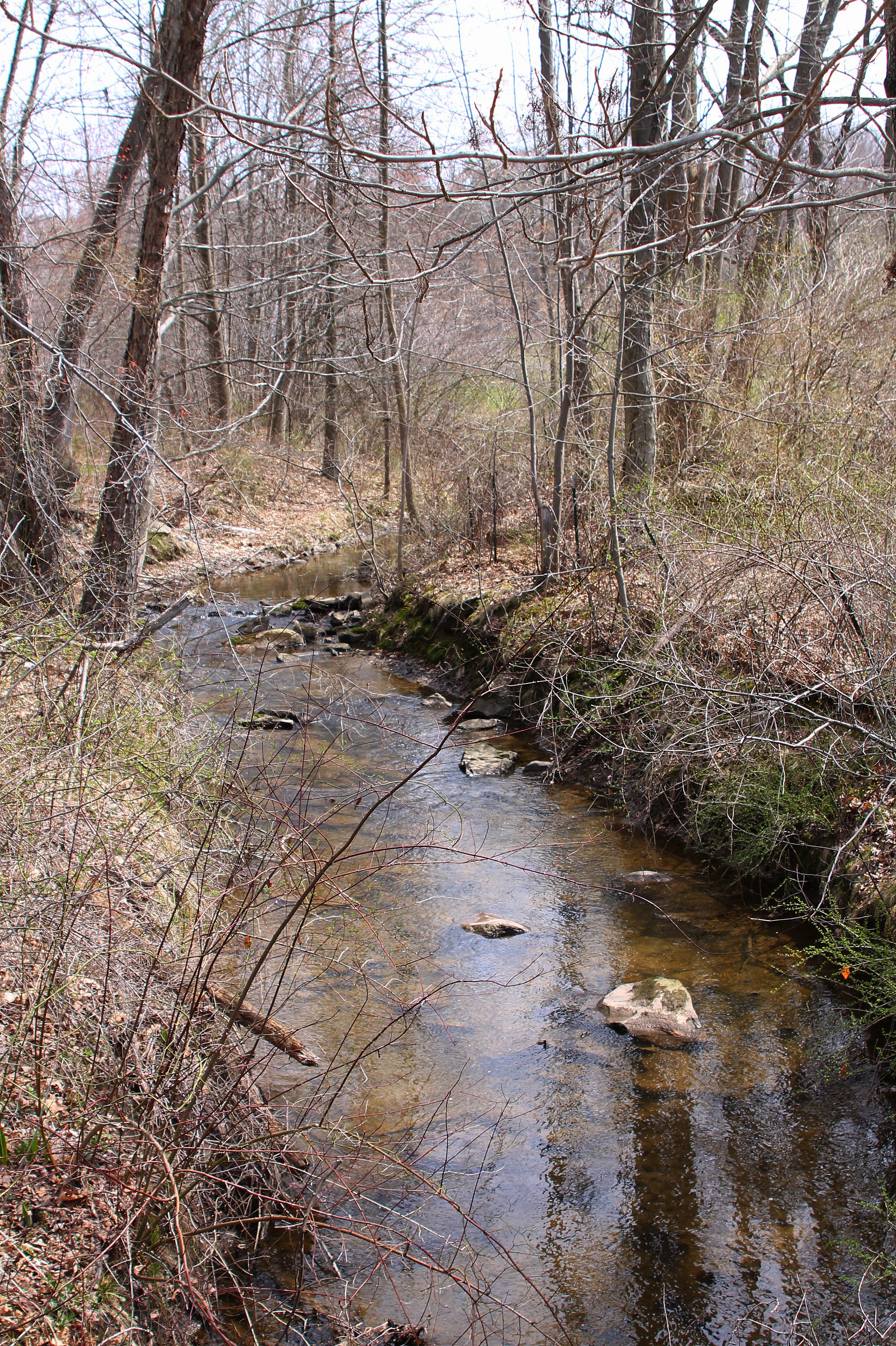
Walker Run looking upstream

Walker Run begins near State Route 4002 in Salem Township. It flows west-southwest for a few tenths of a mile before turning southwest, entering a valley and flowing alongside Stone Church Road. Over the next few miles, the stream gradually turns south-southeast. It then begins meandering southwest, receiving three unnamed tributaries (two from the right and one from the left). The stream eventually turns south-southeast and then south, crossing US Route 11. A short distance further downstream, it turns west for several hundred feet before turning south. It then almost immediately reaches its confluence with the Suquehanna River near the border between Salem Township and Nescopeck Township.

Walker Run joins the Susquehanna River 164.27 miles (264.37 km) upstream of its mouth.

=== Tributaries ===
Walker Run has no named tributaries. However, it does have several unnamed tributaries. The first is approximately 1.6 miles (2.6 km) and joins Walker Run downstream of Summer Hill. The second is approximately 0.5 miles (0.80 km) long and joins Walker Run near the first tributary. The third tributary is approximately 0.3 miles (0.48 km) long.

== Hydrology ==
The discharge of Walker Run at its mouth has a 10 percent chance of peaking at 660 cubic feet per second in any given year. It has a 2 percent chance of reaching 1600 cubic feet per second, a 1 percent chance of reaching 2200 cubic feet per second, and a 0.2 percent chance of reaching 3790 cubic feet per second. The stream has a 10 percent chance of peaking at 550 cubic feet per second upstream of Denns Road and a 2 percent chance of peaking at 1320 cubic feet per second there. It has a 1 percent chance of reaching 1860 cubic feet per second and a 0.2 percent chance of reaching 3100 cubic feet per second. Upstream of the North Market Street bridge, the stream has a 10 percent chance of peaking at 480 cubic feet per second and a 2 percent chance of peaking at 1180 cubic feet per second. It has a 1 percent chance of reaching 1640 cubic feet per second and a 0.2 percent chance of reaching 3600 cubic feet per second.

== Geography and geology ==
The elevation near the mouth of Walker Run is 489 feet (149 m) above sea level. The elevation of the stream's source is between 820 and 840 feet (250 and 260 m) above sea level.

Walker Run flows over rock of the Mahantango Formation in its lower reaches. Further upstream is a narrow band of the Harrell Formation. The stream's upper reaches are on much broader bands of the Irish Valley Member and the Trimmers Rock Formation. The Irish Valley Member contains sandstone, siltstone, claystone, and shale. The Trimmers Rock Formation contains sandstone, siltstone, silt shale, and silty clay shale. The Harrell Formation contains clay shale and silty clay shale and the Mahantango Formation contains claystone and limestone. All of these rock formations date to the Devonian Period.

There are eleven features identified by the Federal Emergency Management Agency as obstructions on Walker Run. This is 44 percent of the 25 obstructions in Salem Township.

There are pools on Walker Run near the bridge carrying North Market Street over the stream. These pools are surrounded by trees. Walker Run has surrounding wetlands in some places.

== Watershed ==
The watershed of Walker Run has an area of 3.83 square miles (9.9 km^{2}). The stream is entirely within the United States Geological Survey quadrangle of Berwick. The mouth of the stream is at the community of Beach Haven. It is also 2 miles (3.2 km) upstream of Berwick.

== History and name ==
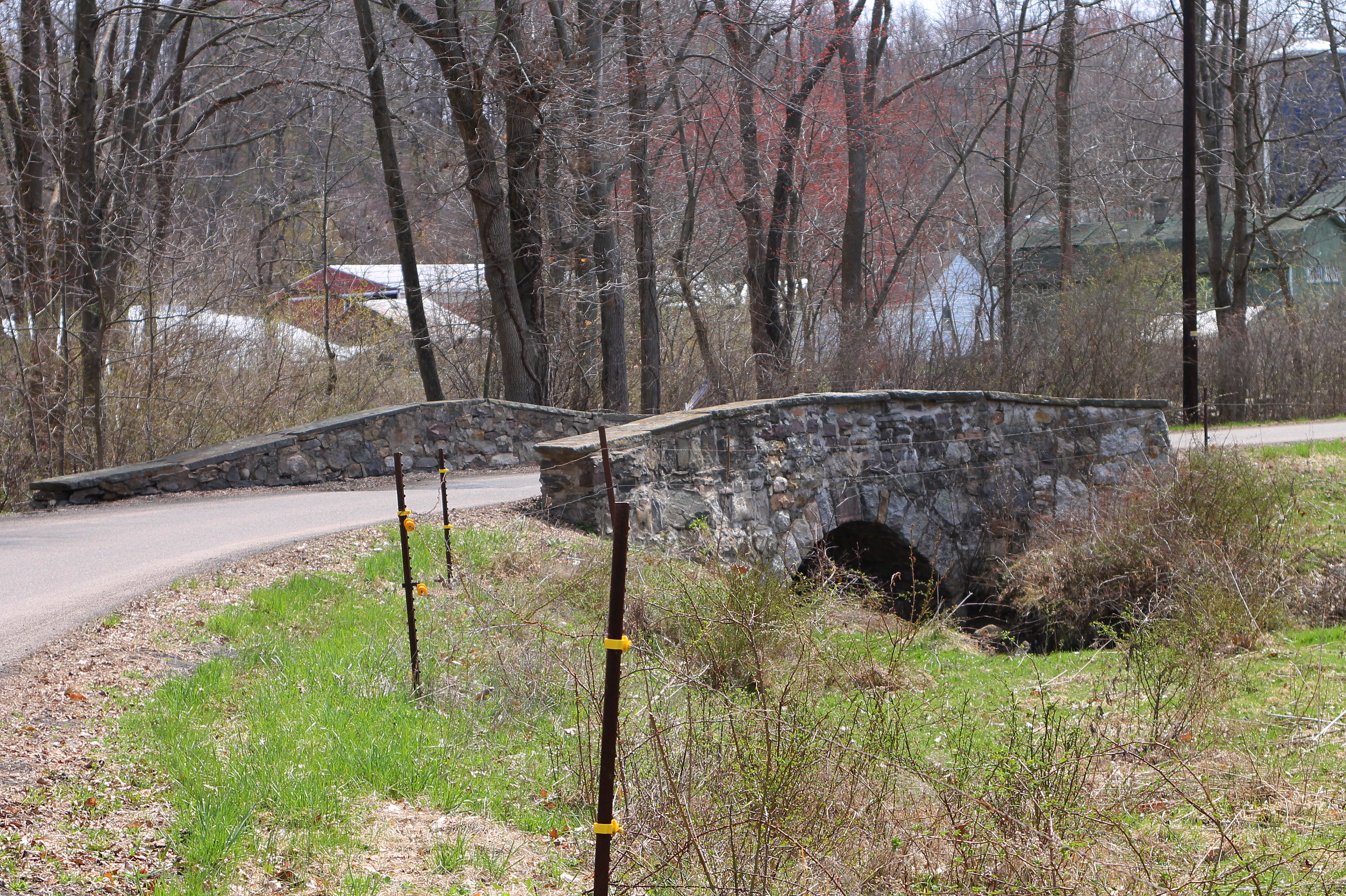
Bridge carrying Market Street over Walker Run

Walker Run was entered into the Geographic Names Information System on August 2, 1979. Its identifier in the Geographic Names Information System is 1190503. The stream is also known as Beach Haven Creek. This alternate name appears on county highway maps.

A concrete slab bridge carrying T-436 and Market Street over Walker Run was built in 1937. The bridge is 25.9 feet (7.9 m) long and is located 1.5 miles (2.4 km) north of US Route 11. A road known as Denns Road also crosses the stream.

Walker Run was surveyed by Fisheries Management Area 4 in 2006 and again by the Division of Environmental Services in 2009. The Pennsylvania Fish and Boat Commission considered adding the stream to their list of wild trout streams at a meeting in October 2009. The stream was added to the list by December 2009.

== Biology ==
The entire drainage basin of Walker Run is designated as a Coldwater Fishery and a Migratory fishery. have discovered wild brown trout in the stream. The trout include fingerlings and several year classes.

== See also ==
- Salem Creek, next tributary of the Susquehanna River going downriver
- Big Wapwallopen Creek, next tributary of the Susquehanna River going upriver
- List of rivers of Pennsylvania
