= Salem Creek (Pennsylvania) =

Salem Creek Stone Church Hollow Creek, Seyberts Creek, Varners Creek
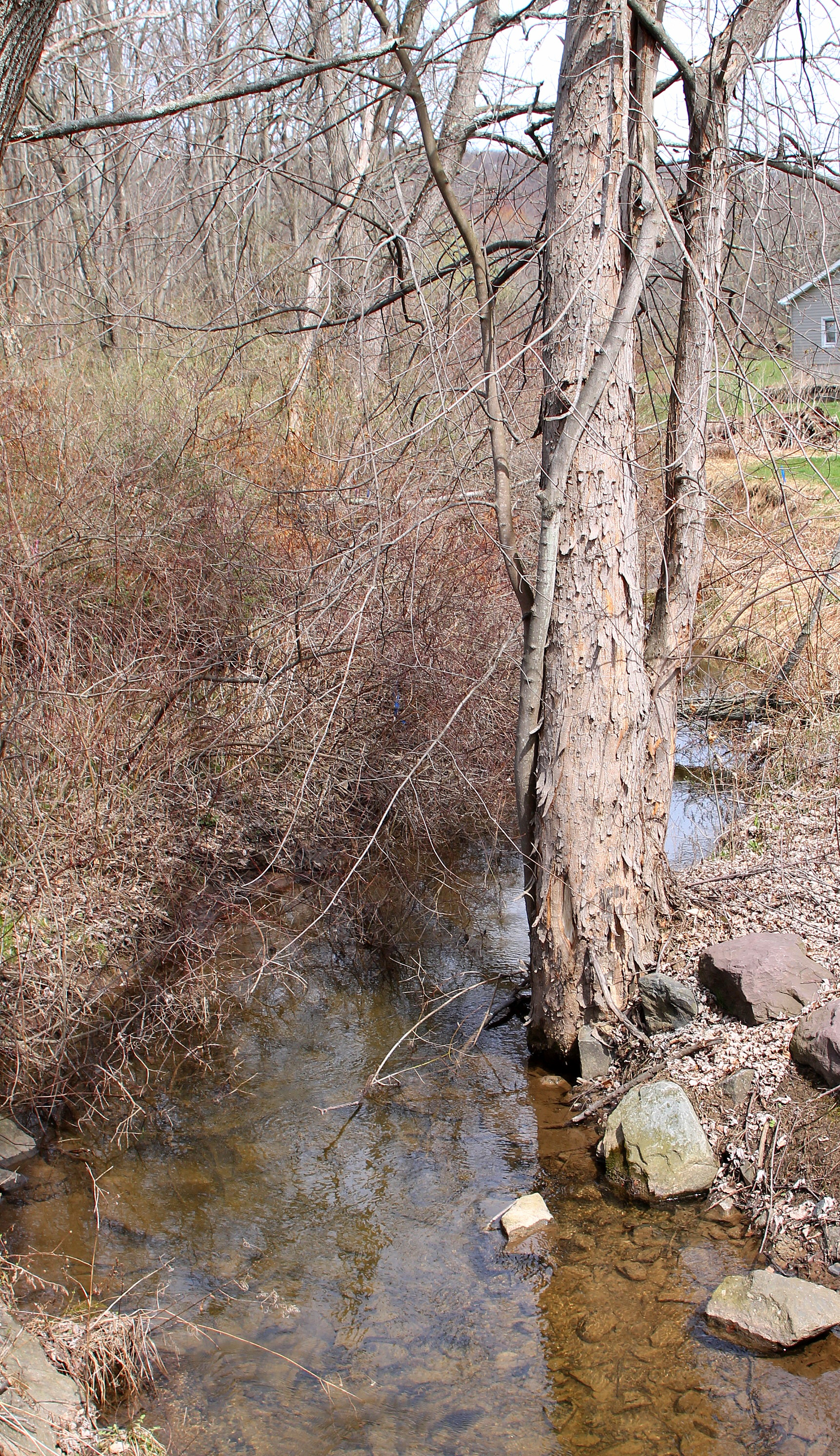
- Salem Creek from Stone Church Road

Physical characteristics
- Source
  - location: southern edge of Lee Mountain in Salem Township, Luzerne County, Pennsylvania
  - elevation: between 920 and 940 feet (280 and 290 m)
- Mouth
  - location: Susquehanna River in Salem Township, Luzerne County, Pennsylvania
  - coordinates: 41°03′50″N 76°11′34″W
  - elevation: 489 ft (149 m)
- Length: 4.8 mi (7.7 km)
- Basin size: 3.77 mi^{2} (9.8 km^{2})
- Discharge
  - average: 3.95 cu ft/s (0.112 m^{3}/s)

Basin features
- Progression: Susquehanna River → Chesapeake Bay
- Tributaries
  - right: one unnamed tributary

Salem Creek (also known as Stone Church Hollow Creek, Seyberts Creek, or Varners Creek) is a tributary of the Susquehanna River in Luzerne County, Pennsylvania, in the United States. It is approximately 4.8 miles (7.7 km) long and flows through Salem Township. The watershed of the creek has an area of 3.77 square miles (9.8 km^{2}). It has no named tributaries, but one unnamed tributary. Lee Mountain and Summer Hill are both in the vicinity of the creek. It flows through a gorge at one point. The creek is in the ridge and valley region and is near the southern terminus of the Wisconsinan glaciation. It served as a sluiceway for glacial meltwater during the aforementioned glacial period. The creek's discharge is considerably lower than it was during the previous glaciation. Rock formations such as the Catskill Formation and the Trimmers Rock Formation occur near it, as does glacial till.

A dam with a height of 18 feet (5.5 m) was constructed on Salem Creek by the Berwick Water Company. The dam experienced a failure in the 1950s. A weir is also present on the creek. One bridge crossing the creek is scheduled for replacement and/or rehabilitation. Swampland occurs at its headwaters. The entire drainage basin is designated as a Coldwater Fishery and a Migratory Fishery. The creek is inhabited by trout.

== Course ==
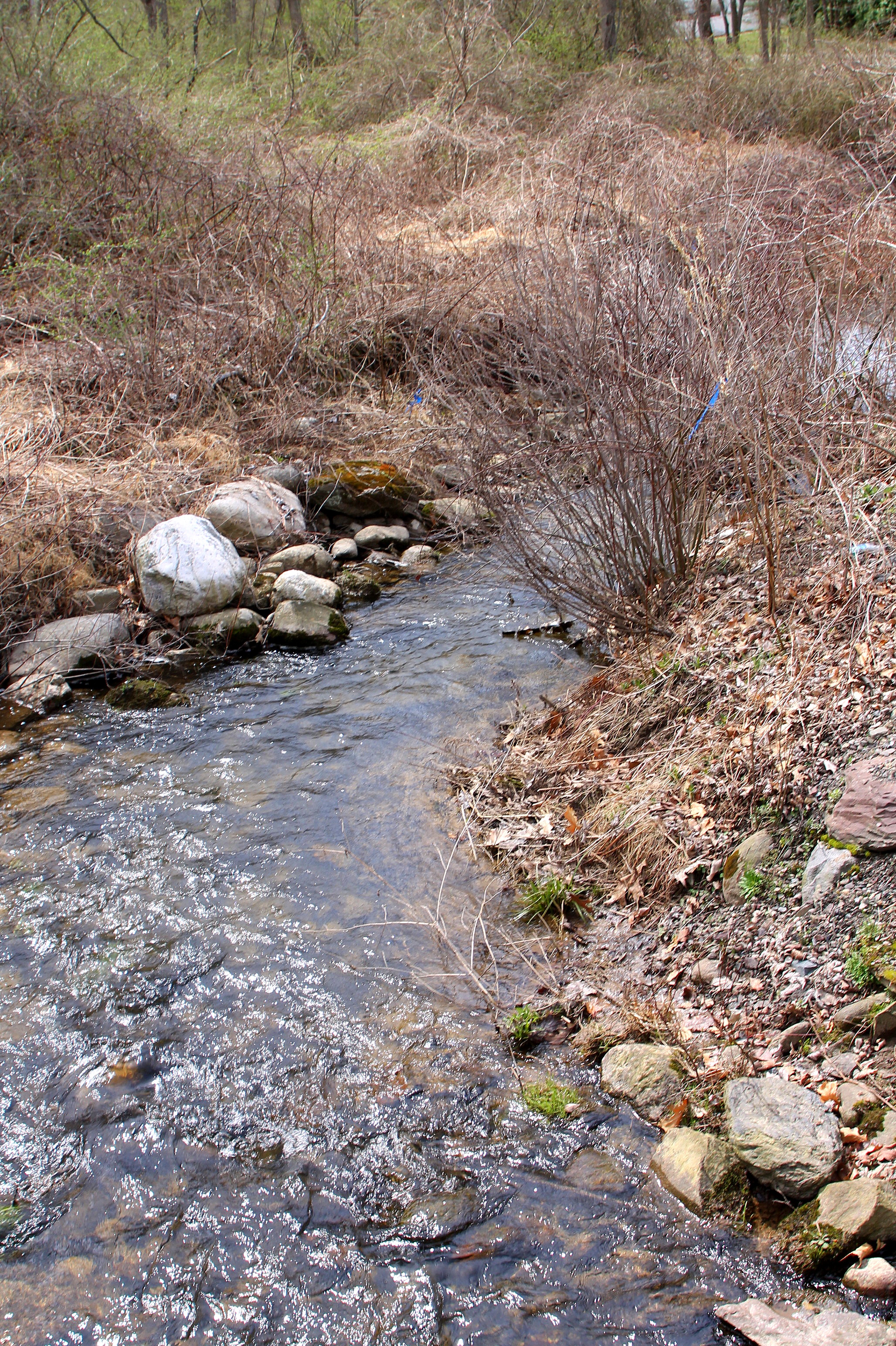
Salem Creek looking downstream

Salem Creek begins on the southern edge of Lee Mountain in Salem Township. It flows west for a short distance before entering a valley and turning southwest. After several tenths of a mile, the creek turns south for some distance. It briefly turns southeast before turning south again for a few miles, receiving an unnamed tributary from the right. The creek's valley becomes much shallower and nearly disappears as the creek turns south-southeast for several tenths of a mile. It then turns south and enters a valley known as Sybert Hollow for a few tenths of a mile. On the southern side of the hollow, the creek crosses US Route 11 and reaches its confluence with the Susquehanna River a short distance downstream, near the border between Salem Township and Nescopeck Township.

Salem Creek joins the Susquehanna River 163.46 miles (263.06 km) upriver of its mouth.

=== Tributaries ===
Salem Creek has no named tributaries. However, it does have one unnamed tributary. The unnamed tributary is approximately 0.8 miles (1.3 km) long and joins Salem Creek downstream of Summer Hill.

== Hydrology ==
The average daily discharge of Salem Creek is estimated to be 3.95 cubic feet per second. At the mouth of the creek, its peak annual discharge has a 10 percent chance of reaching 640 cubic feet per second. Its peak annual discharge has a 2 percent change of reaching 1480 cubic feet per second and a 1 percent chance of reaching 2010 cubic feet per second. The peak annual discharge of the creek has a 0.2 percent chance of reaching 4300 cubic feet per second.

The discharge of Salem Creek is much lower than it was during previous glaciation periods. However, it is still capable of causing destructive floods during times of sustained runoff.

== Geography ==
The elevation near the mouth of Salem Creek is 489 feet (149 m) above sea level. The elevation of the creek's source is between 920 and 940 feet (280 and 290 m) above sea level.

The headwaters of Salem Creek are on the southern side of Lee Mountain. In its middle reaches, it passes through the escarpment of Summer Hill. North of that hill, the creek's valley is deeply incised. Just upstream of Summer Hill, it passes through a rocky gorge with potholes and plunge pools. The gorge is relatively deep. Additionally, the creek descends through Sybert Hollow in its last 0.5 miles (0.80 km) to reach the elevation of the Susquehanna River.

A dam and a weir made of concrete are situated on Salem Creek. The weir is 1,500 feet (460 m) downstream of the dam. There is a natural amphitheater on the creek as well. The amphitheater is 9 feet (2.7 m) wide, 6 feet (1.8 m) high, and 4.5 feet (1.4 m) deep.

== Geology ==
Salem Creek is in the ridge and valley physiographical province. The creek is a freestone stream. A total of 56 percent of an 839 feet (256 m) long stretch of the creek consists of riffles. A total of 31 percent of that stretch consists of runs and the remaining 13 percent consists of pools. During the late Wisconsinan glaciation, Salem Creek, as well as several other streams in the area, served as a sluiceway for glacial meltwater. The terminus of the Woodfordian glaciers crosses the creek 2.3 miles (3.7 km) upstream of the mouth. The terminus then runs northward for 1.4 miles (2.3 km) to the foot of Lee Mountain.

A 1978 report noted "spectacular" signs of glacial meltwater erosion on Salem Creek in a 1,500 feet (460 m) long stretch just south of the glacial terminus, near an old dam. These signs of glacial meltwater erosion are a series of potholes or plunge pools in the creek's valley. The potholes are in sandstone and siltstone of the Trimmers Rock Formation. They are 15 feet (4.6 m) wide and 10 to 15 feet (3.0 to 4.6 m) deep. The potholes were later breached due to downcutting.

The gorge that Salem Creek flows through is lined with resistant rocks of the Catskill Formation and the Trimmers Rock Formation. A boulder-rich glacial till occurs to the east of the creek. Additionally, there is a large and pitted field of kame in the vicinity of its headwaters. Illinoian till occurs at elevations lower than 700 feet (210 m) above sea level in the creek's valley.

== Watershed ==
The watershed of Salem Creek has an area of 3.77 square miles (9.8 km^{2}). The creek is entirely within the United States Geological Survey quadrangle of Berwick. It is located approximately 2 miles (3.2 km) northeast of the borough of Berwick. The creek is 1 mile (1.6 km) downriver of the village of Beach Haven on the Susquehanna River.

The headwaters of Salem Creek are on badly drained and swampy land. However, prior to the Woodfordian glaciation, the headwaters were located in a notch on Lee Mountain, approximately 0.4 miles (0.64 km) from the present headwaters. The former headwaters currently are part of the watershed of a shorter stream that flows eastward to the Susquehanna River.

== History and name ==
Salem Creek was entered into the Geographic Names Information System on August 2, 1979. Its identifier in the Geographic Names Information System is 1186856. The stream is also known as Stone Church Hollow Creek. This name is typically used on county highway maps. Other names for it include Seyberts Creek and Varners Creek.

The Berwick Water Company (now known as the Keystone Water Company) once constructed a dam on Salem Creek upstream of Summer Hill. The dam is an earth-rock dam that is 18 feet (5.5 m) high. In mid-October 1954, a rainstorm caused by Hurricane Hazel caused the creek to breach the dam, which failed as a result.

An electrofishing survey was carried out on Salem Creek on September 7, 1994.

A bridge carrying State Route 4037 crosses Salem Creek. As of 2014, there are plans to replace and/or rehabilitate the bridge.

== Biology ==
The entire drainage basin of Salem Creek is designated as a Coldwater Fishery and a Migratory Fishery. Wild trout naturally reproduce in it between its headwaters and its mouth. Both brook and brown trout inhabit the creek. However, brook trout are more common. The typical substrate for trout spawn in the creek is gravel.

== See also ==
- Nescopeck Creek, next tributary of the Susquehanna River going downriver
- Walker Run, next tributary of the Susquehanna River going upriver
- List of rivers of Pennsylvania
