= Nescopeck State Park =

State park in Pennsylvania, United States

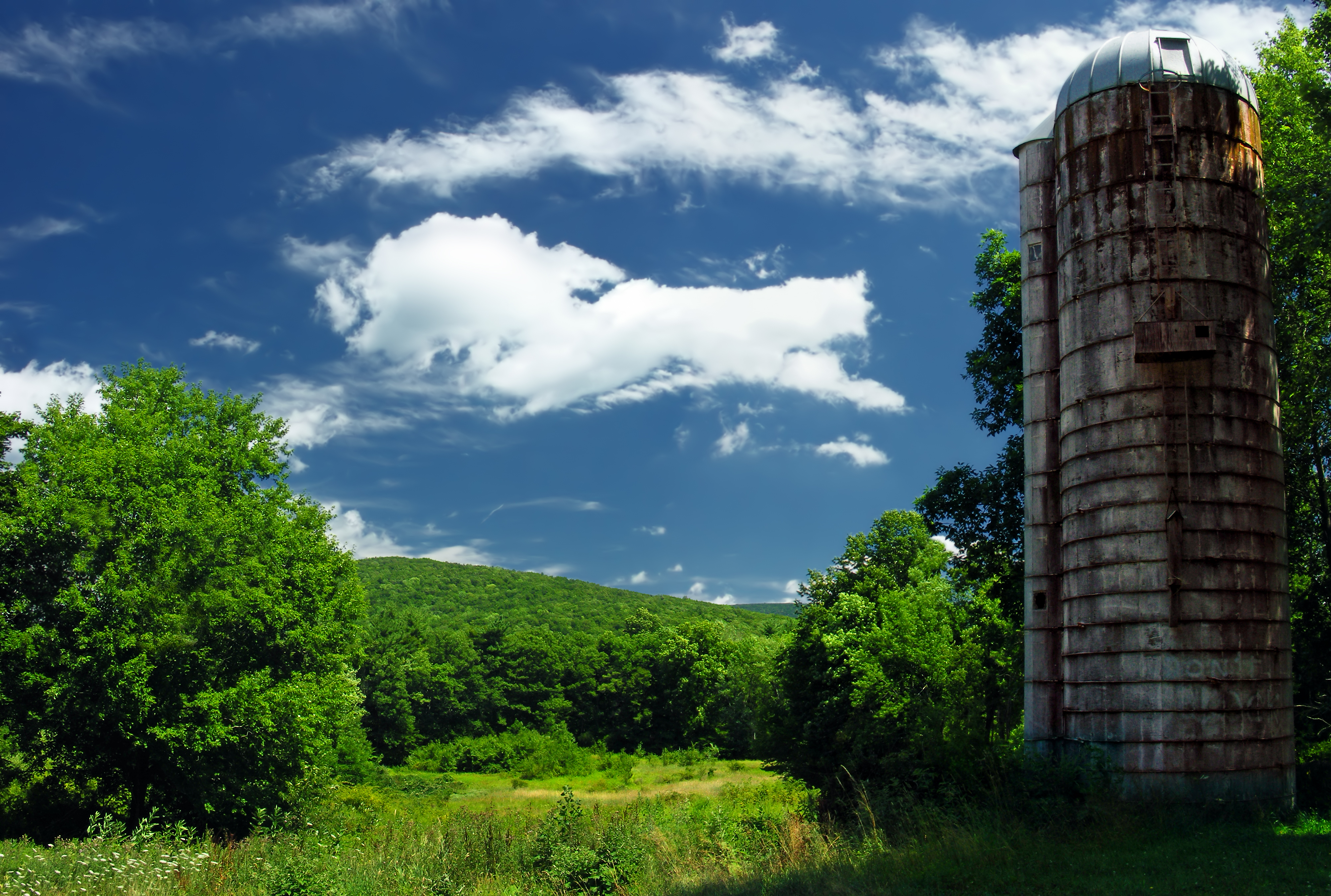
- An abandoned silo at Nescopeck State Park

- Location within Pennsylvania Location within the United States
- Interactive map of Nescopeck State Park
- Location: Luzerne County, Pennsylvania, United States
- Coordinates: 41°05′27″N 75°52′50″W
- Area: 3,550 acres (1,440 ha)
- Elevation: 1,053 feet (321 m)
- Established: 1969 acquisition; 2004 opening
- Administrator: Pennsylvania Department of Conservation and Natural Resources
- Website: Official website
- Pennsylvania State Parks

Nescopeck State Park is a Pennsylvania state park on 3,550 acres (1,437 ha) in Butler and Dennison townships, Luzerne County, Pennsylvania (in the United States). The park is one of the newest state parks in Pennsylvania. In the early 1970s, the state acquired 164 properties which made up the park. The park's Environmental Education Center is one of its newest additions; it opened in April 2005. Nescopeck Creek runs through the valley between Mount Yeager and Nescopeck Mountain. The park is near Interstate 80 just off Pennsylvania Route 309 (near Conyngham).

== Trails ==
There are 19 miles (31 km) of trails in Nescopeck State Park. The trails go through forests, meadows and wetlands. Most trails begin at Honey Hole Road which is the main access road for the park. The trails are open for cross-country skiing but closed to mountain biking.

== Wildlife ==
The park's 200 acres (81 ha) of wetlands, forests, and the banks of Nescopeck Creek provide habitat for over 160 different species of birds, 30 species of reptiles and amphibians and over 600 species of plants.

== Hunting and fishing ==
Hunting is permitted on most of Nescopeck State Park. Hunters are expected to follow the rules and regulations of the Pennsylvania Game Commission. The common game species are squirrels, turkey, woodcock, and white-tailed deer. Hunters may also access State Game Lands 187 through the park for additional hunting opportunities.

Lake Frances is a 9 acres (3.6 ha) man-made lake on a tributary of Nescopeck Creek. The lake has panfish, bass and trout in its waters. Nescopeck Creek is designated as a high quality cold-water fishery with brown and brook trout.

== Gallery ==
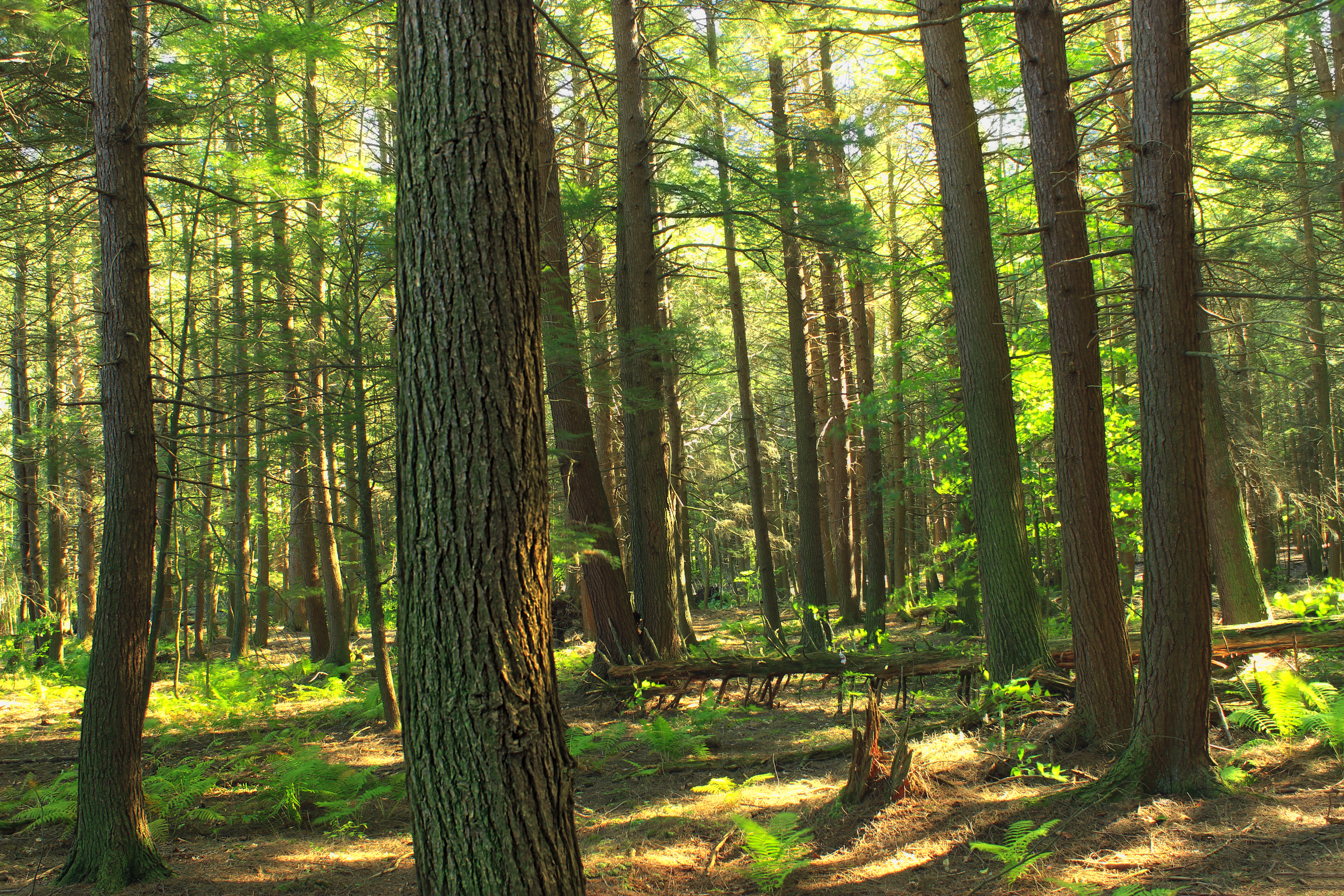
Hemlocks near Nescopeck Creek

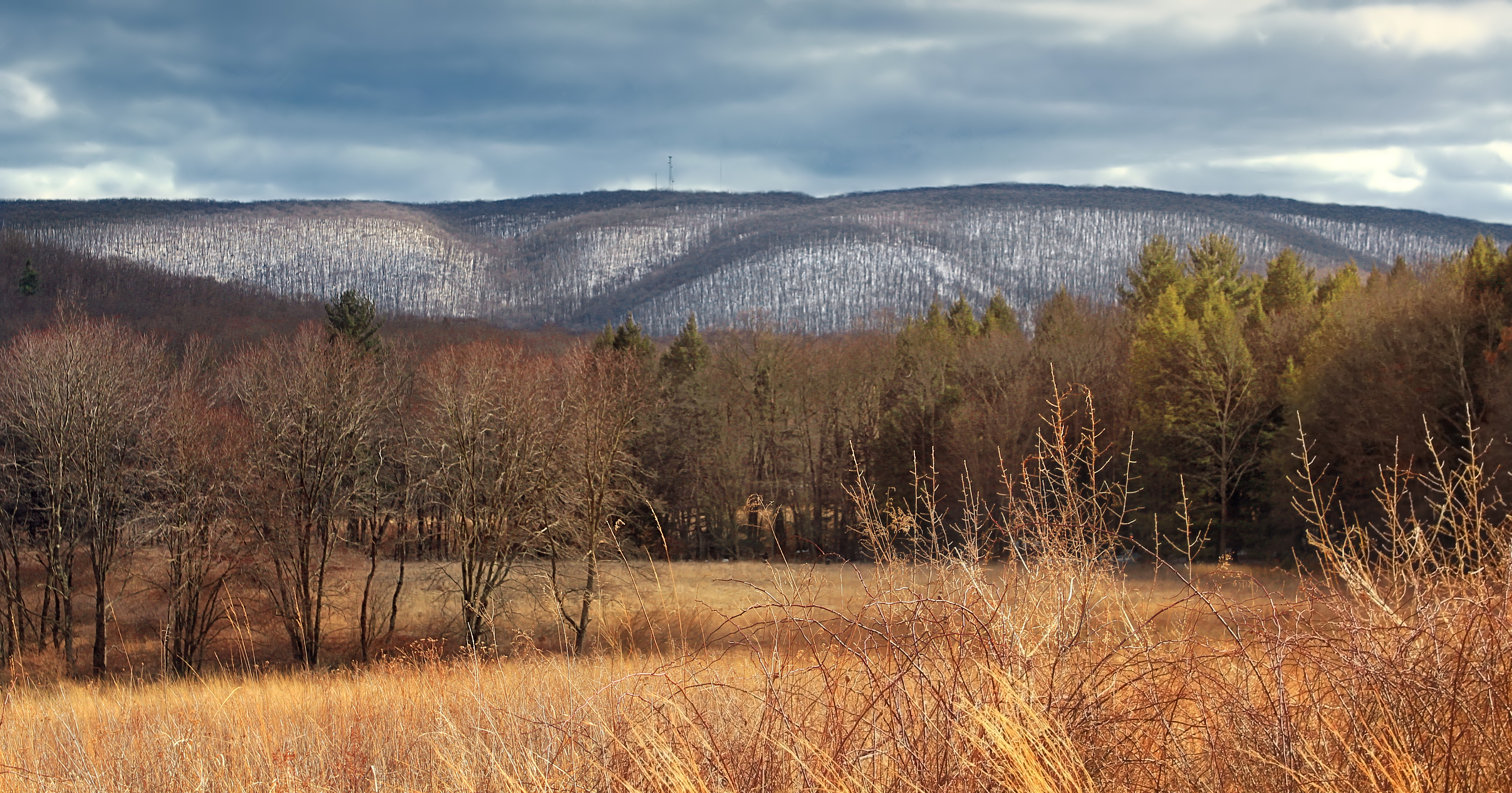
Snow-covered mountains in Nescopeck State Park

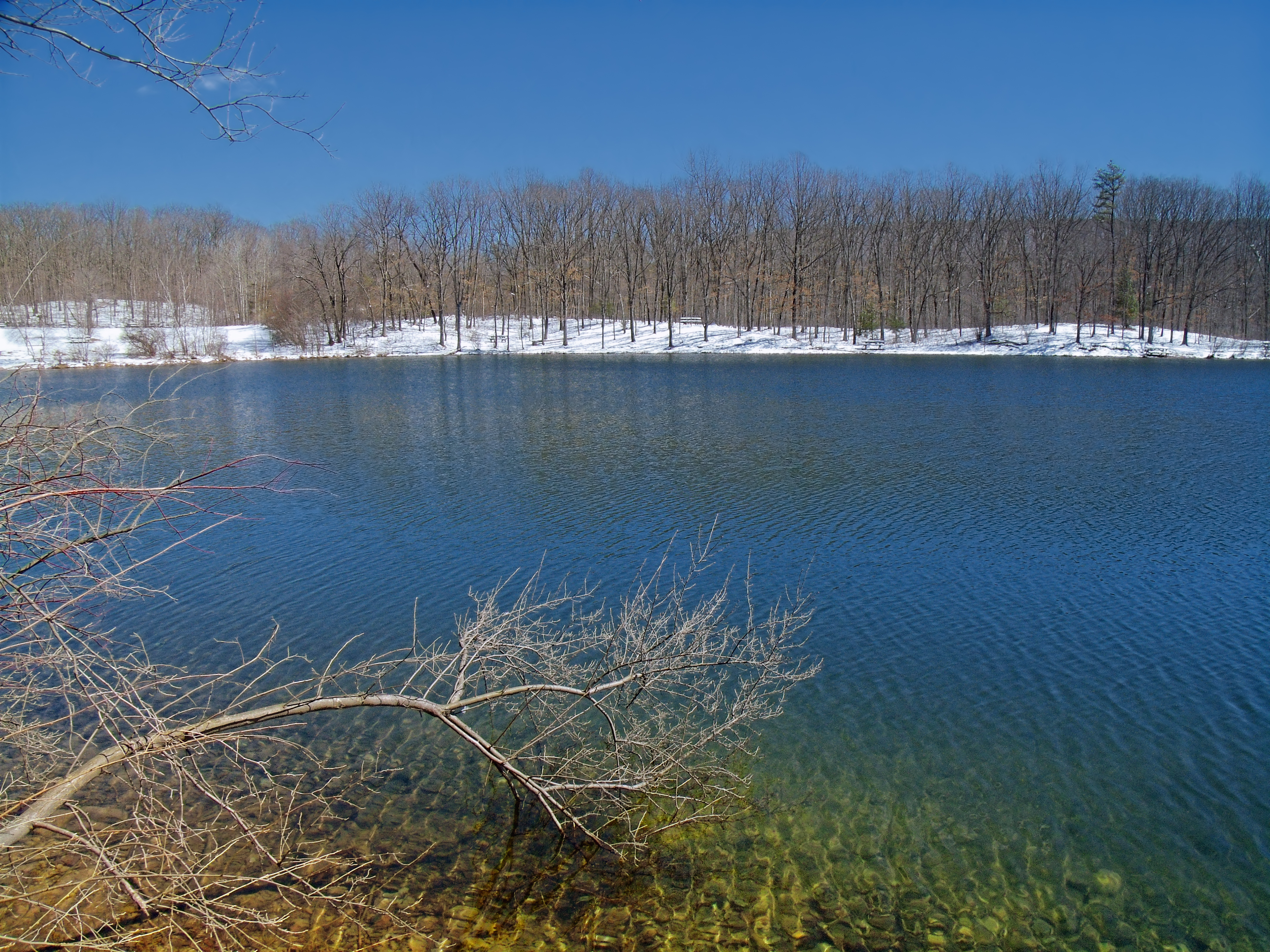
Lake Frances in Nescopeck State Park

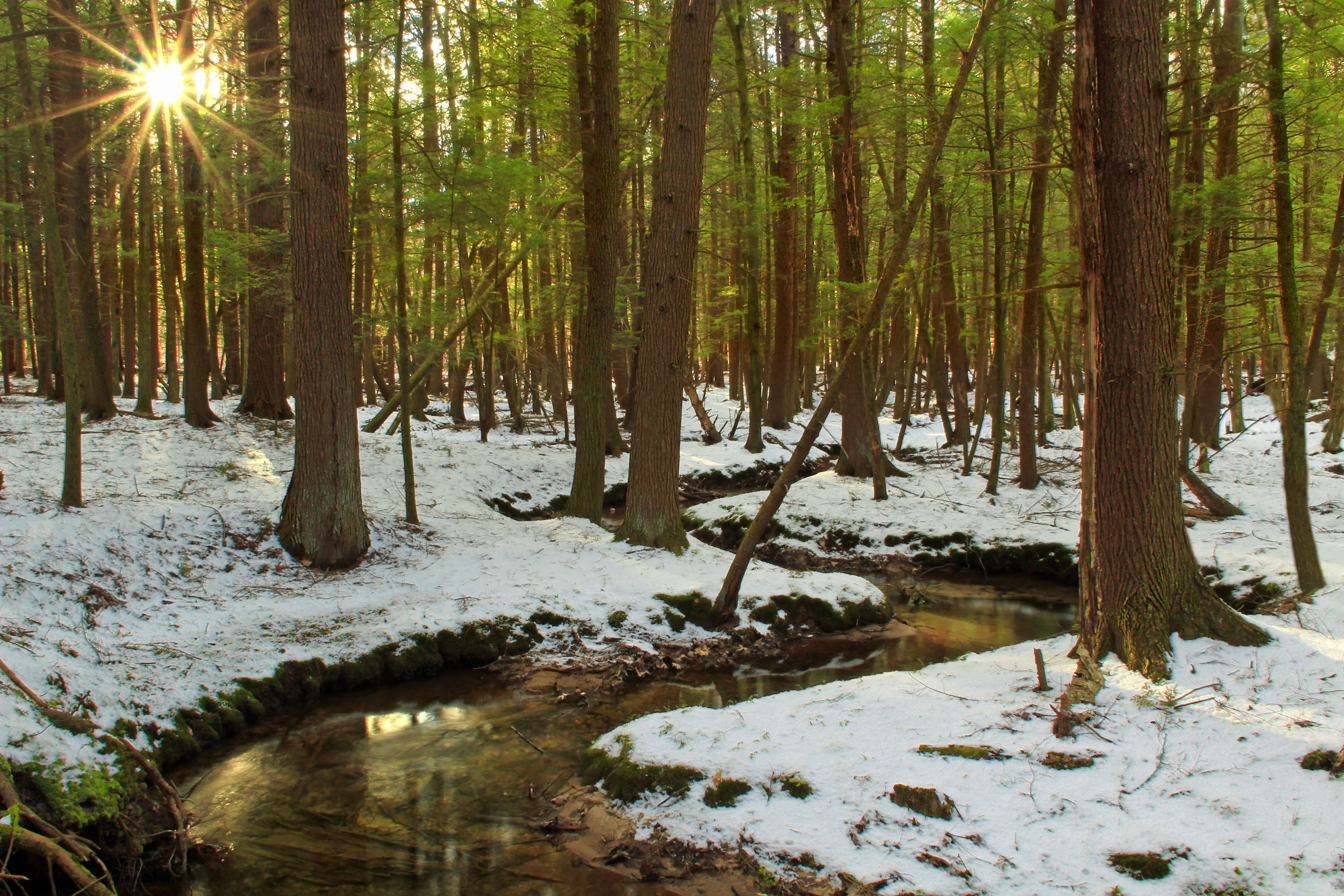
Nescopeck State Park
