= Dennison Township, Pennsylvania =

Township in Pennsylvania, US

Coordinates: 41°05′00″N 75°49′59″W

- Township
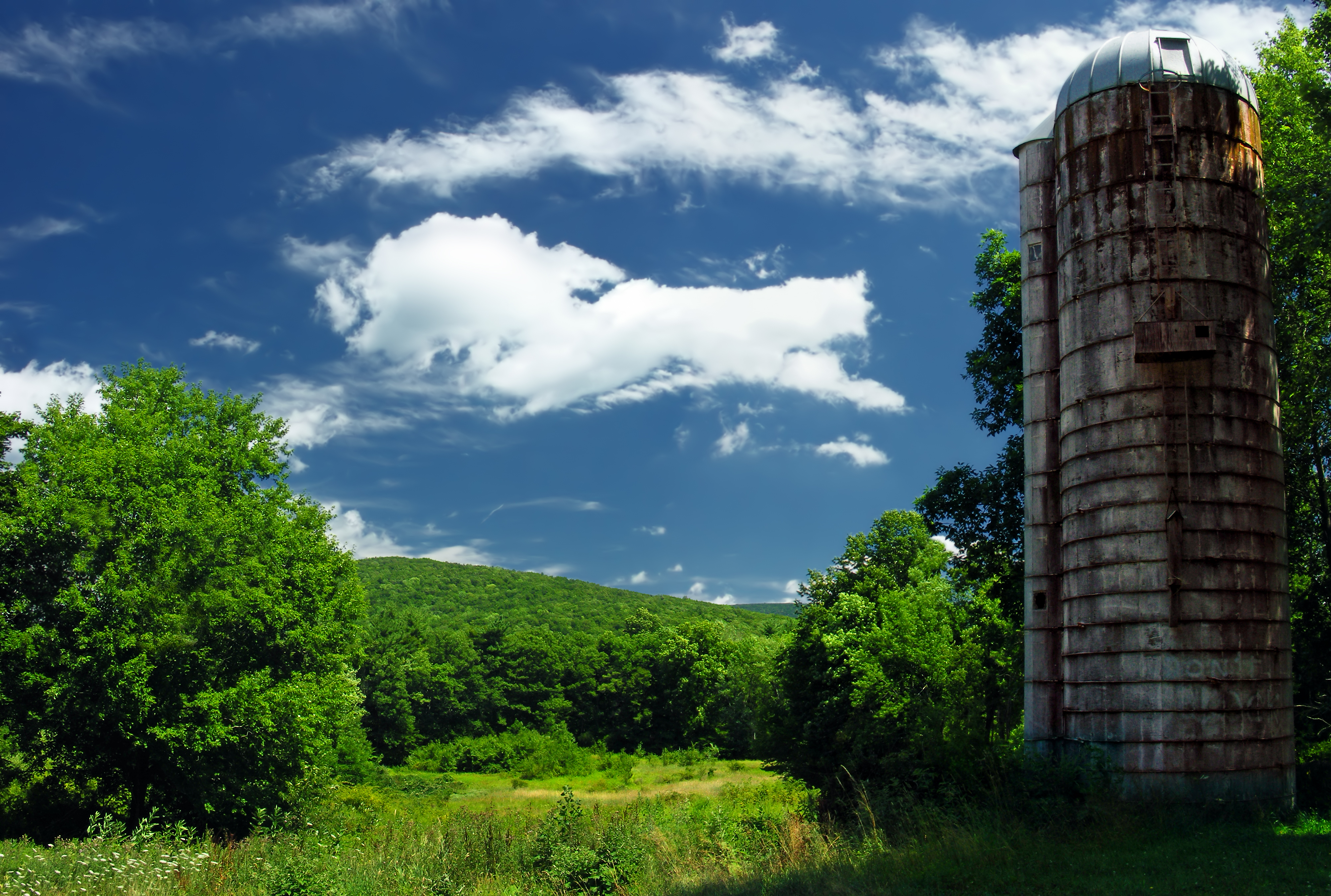
- An abandoned silo in Dennison Township

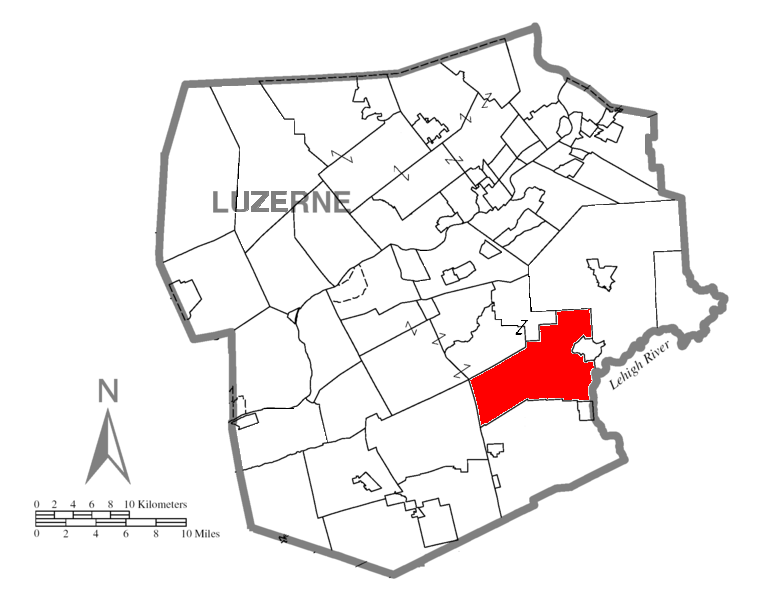
- Map of Luzerne County highlighting Dennison Township

- Map of Pennsylvania highlighting Luzerne County
- Country: United States
- State: Pennsylvania
- County: Luzerne

Area
  - Total: 35.56 sq mi (92.10 km^{2})
  - Land: 35.43 sq mi (91.76 km^{2})
  - Water: 0.13 sq mi (0.34 km^{2})

Population (2020)
  - Total: 961 ▼
  - Estimate (2021): 969
  - Density: 31.5/sq mi (12.18/km^{2})
- Time zone: UTC-5 (Eastern (EST))
  - Summer (DST): UTC-4 (EDT)
- FIPS code: 42-079-18868
- Website: dennisontwp.org

Dennison Township is a township in Luzerne County, Pennsylvania, United States. The population was 961 at the 2020 census.

== History ==
It is believed that Israel Inman was the first white settler in the township, having traveled up Nescopeck Creek from its mouth in 1833. The next group to arrive after Inman was the Lehigh Coal & Navigation Company. In 1837, they cut a road through the township in order to get to Wilkes-Barre. This was succeeded by the construction of railroads in the following decades. Dennison Township was formed from a section of the original Hanover Township in 1839. At the time, the new township included what is now Foster Township; it broke away in the 1850s. Logging was a major industry in the area due to the abundance of trees.

== Geography ==
According to the United States Census Bureau, the township has a total area of 35.6 square miles (92.1 km^{2}), of which 35.4 square miles (91.8 km^{2}) is land and 0.12 square miles (0.3 km^{2}), or 0.37%, is water. A vast majority of Dennison Township is made up of thick forests. The township is scarcely populated; most of its residents live in the southeastern portion of the township. A few farms are also located in this section of the community. Many small lakes and streams (e.g., Creasy Creek and Nescopeck Creek) are scattered throughout Dennison. The Lehigh River forms the township's southeastern border. Nescopeck State Park makes up the western part of the township. It contains part of the census-designated place of Mountain Top.

=== Transportation ===
I-476 travels through the northeastern section of Dennison Township. I-80 travels through the southwestern portion of the community. PA 437 travels through the heart of the township.

== Demographics ==
Historical population
Census	Pop.	Note	%±
2000	908		—
2010	1,125		23.9%
2020	961		−14.6%
2021 (est.)	969		0.8%

At the 2000 census there were 908 people, 375 households, and 255 families living in the township. The population density was 26.2 inhabitants per square mile (10.1/km^{2}). There were 492 housing units at an average density of 14.2/sq mi (5.5/km^{2}). The racial makeup of the township was 99.01% White, 0.22% African American, 0.22% Native American, and 0.55% from two or more races. Hispanic or Latino of any race were 0.99%.

There were 375 households, 26.9% had children under the age of 18 living with them, 54.4% were married couples living together, 8.3% had a female householder with no husband present, and 32.0% were non-families. 27.5% of households were made up of individuals, and 12.8% were one person aged 65 or older. The average household size was 2.42 and the average family size was 2.96.

The age distribution was 20.4% under the age of 18, 6.1% from 18 to 24, 28.9% from 25 to 44, 28.6% from 45 to 64, and 16.1% 65 or older. The median age was 42 years. For every 100 females, there were 105.0 males. For every 100 females age 18 and over, there were 102.5 males.

The median household income was $41,875 and the median family income was $51,563. Males had a median income of $36,667 versus $24,145 for females. The per capita income for the township was $21,373. About 5.8% of families and 5.7% of the population were below the poverty line, including 5.6% of those under age 18 and 11.6% of those age 65 or over.

== Education ==
Dennison Township is part of Crestwood School District.

== Gallery ==
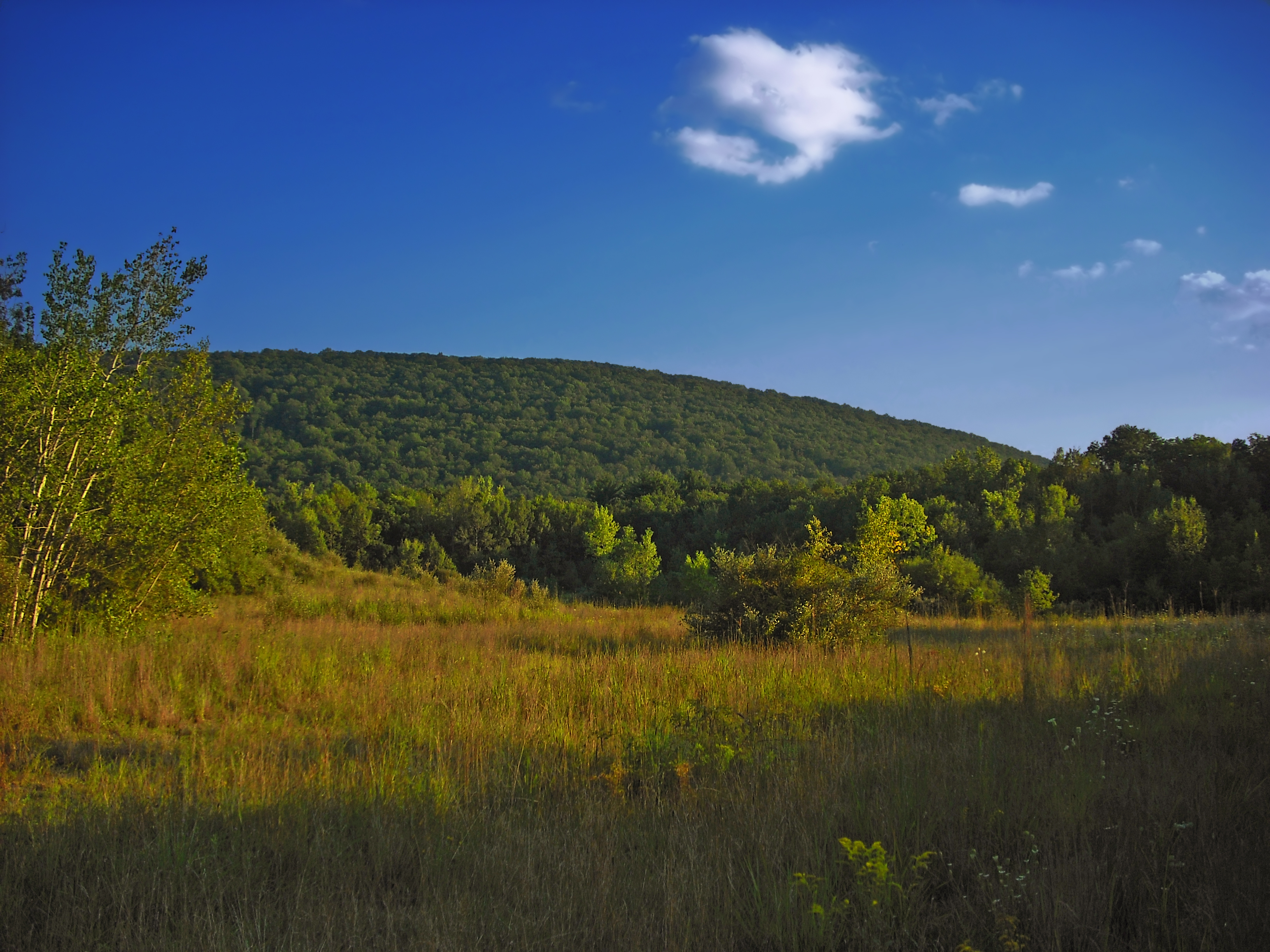
A mountain in Dennison Township

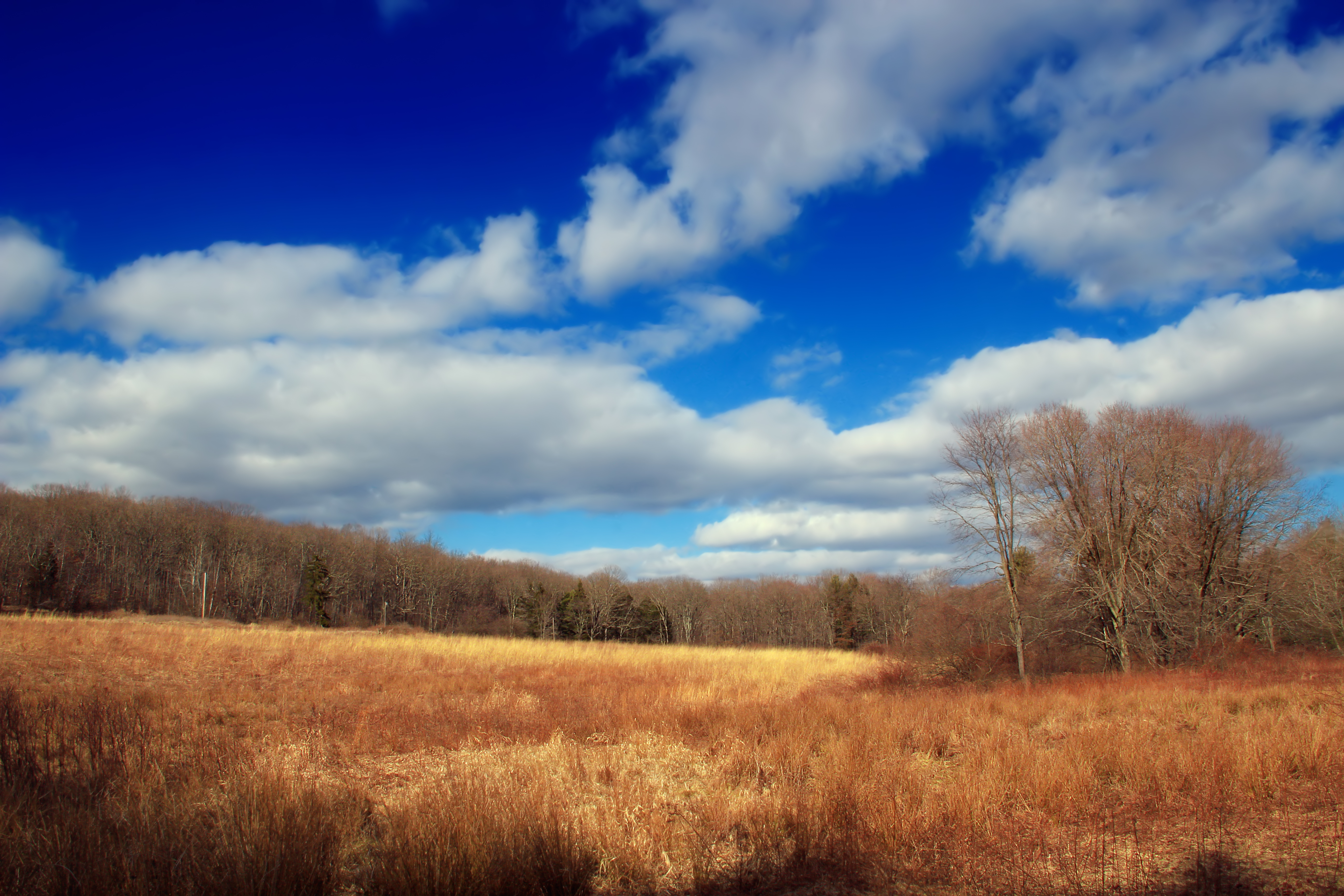
A lightly wooded meadow in Dennison Township

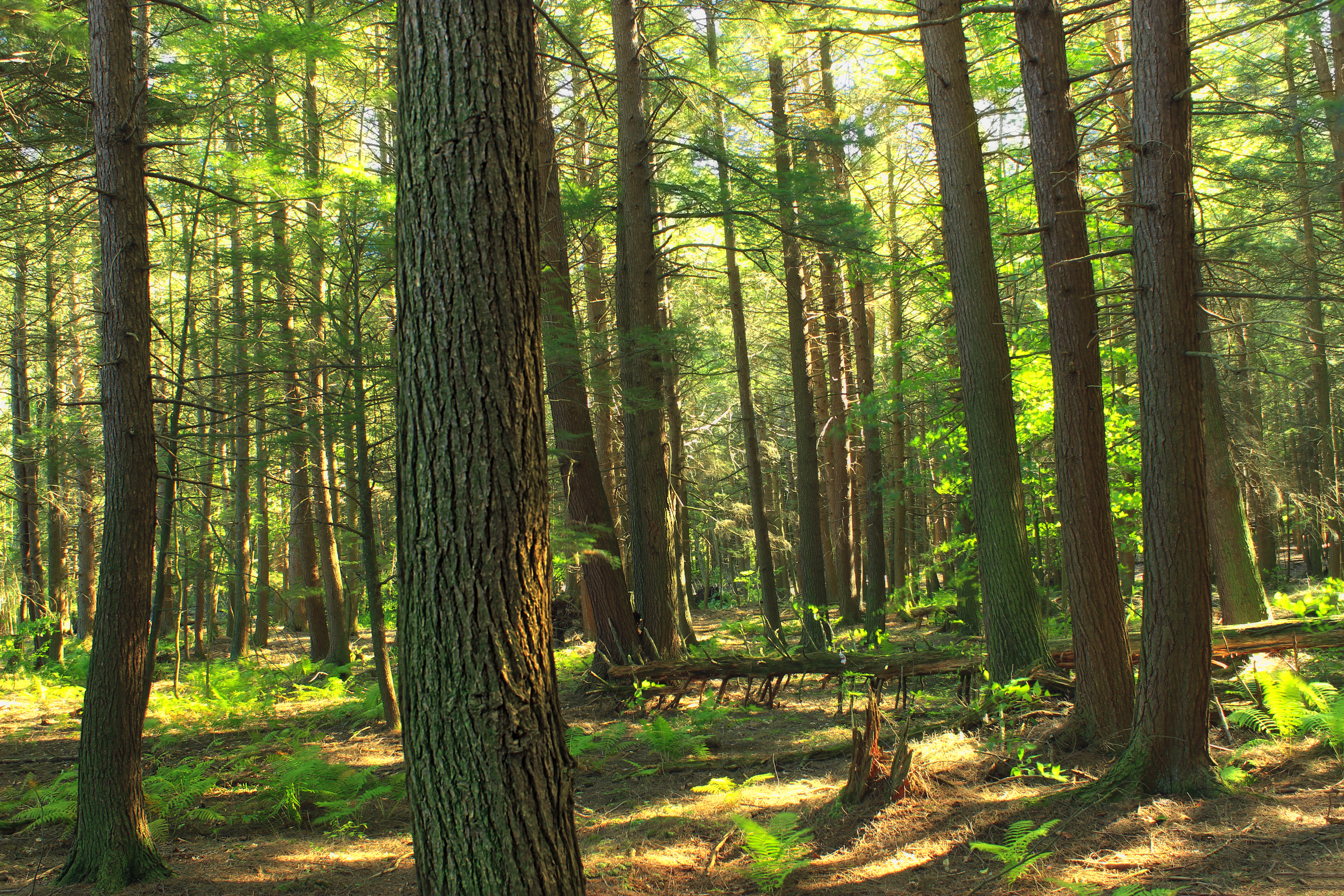
Hemlocks near Nescopeck Creek

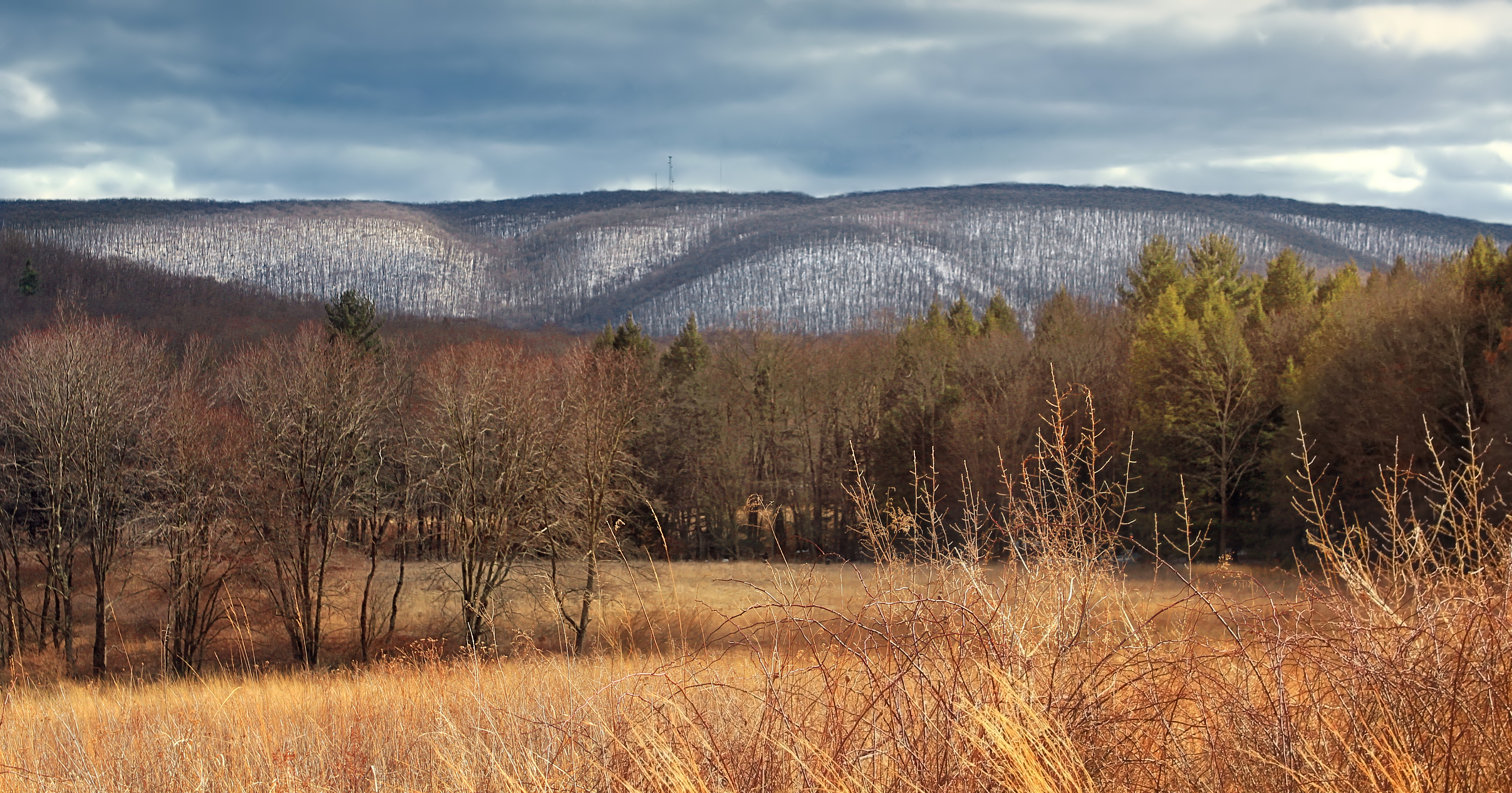
Snow-covered mountains in Nescopeck State Park

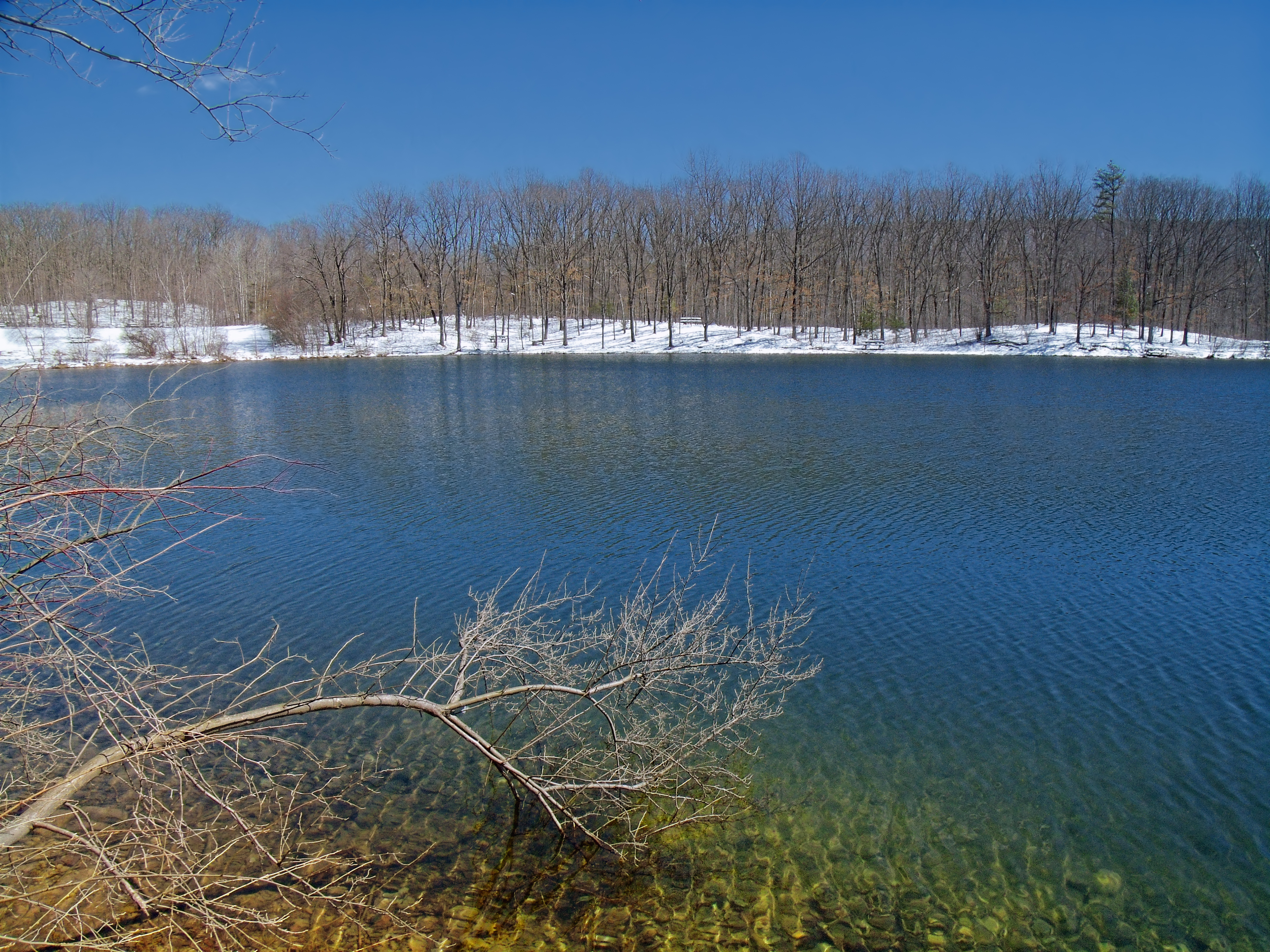
Lake Frances in Dennison Township

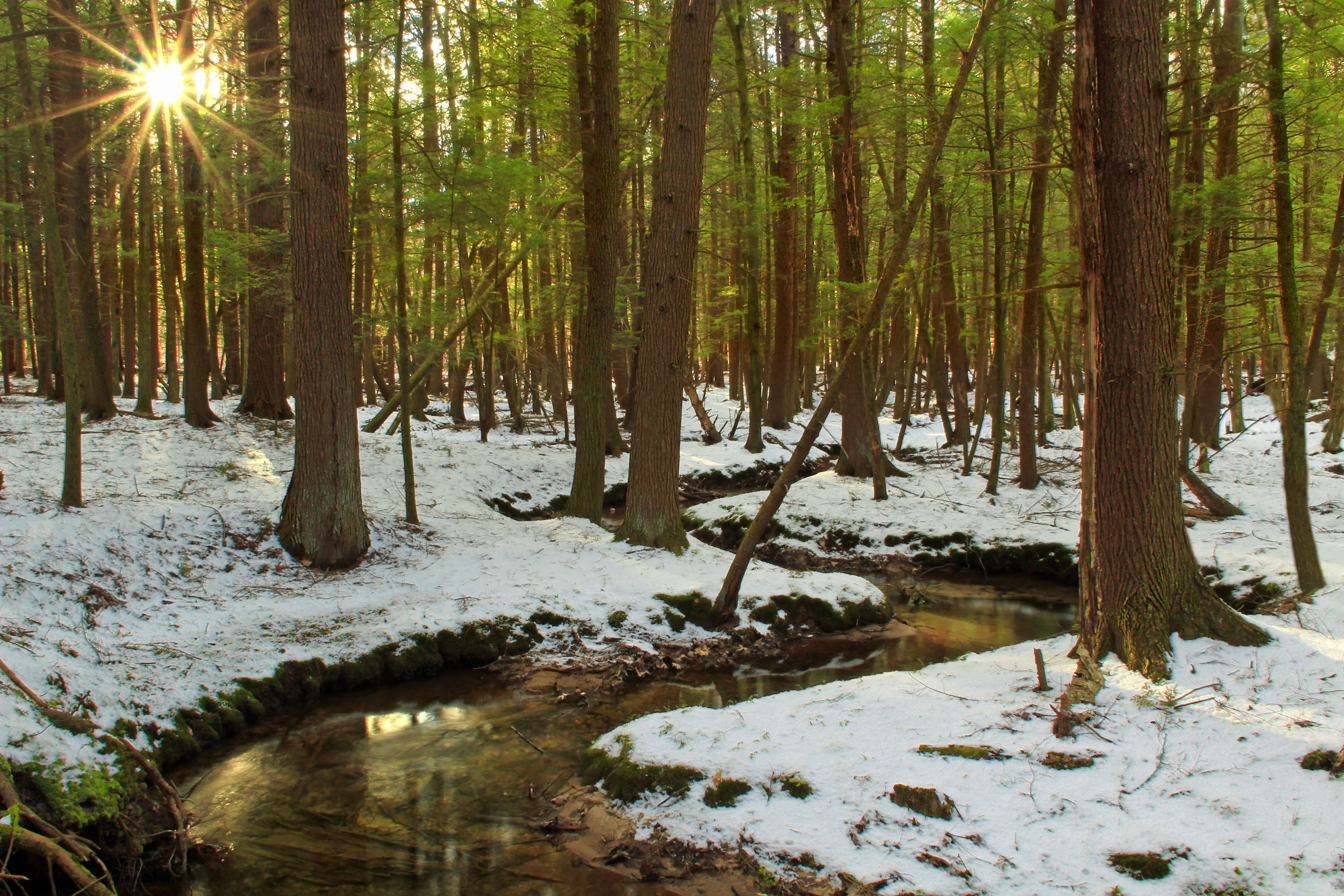
A forest in Dennison Township
