= Nescopeck Creek =

Tributary of the Susquehanna River

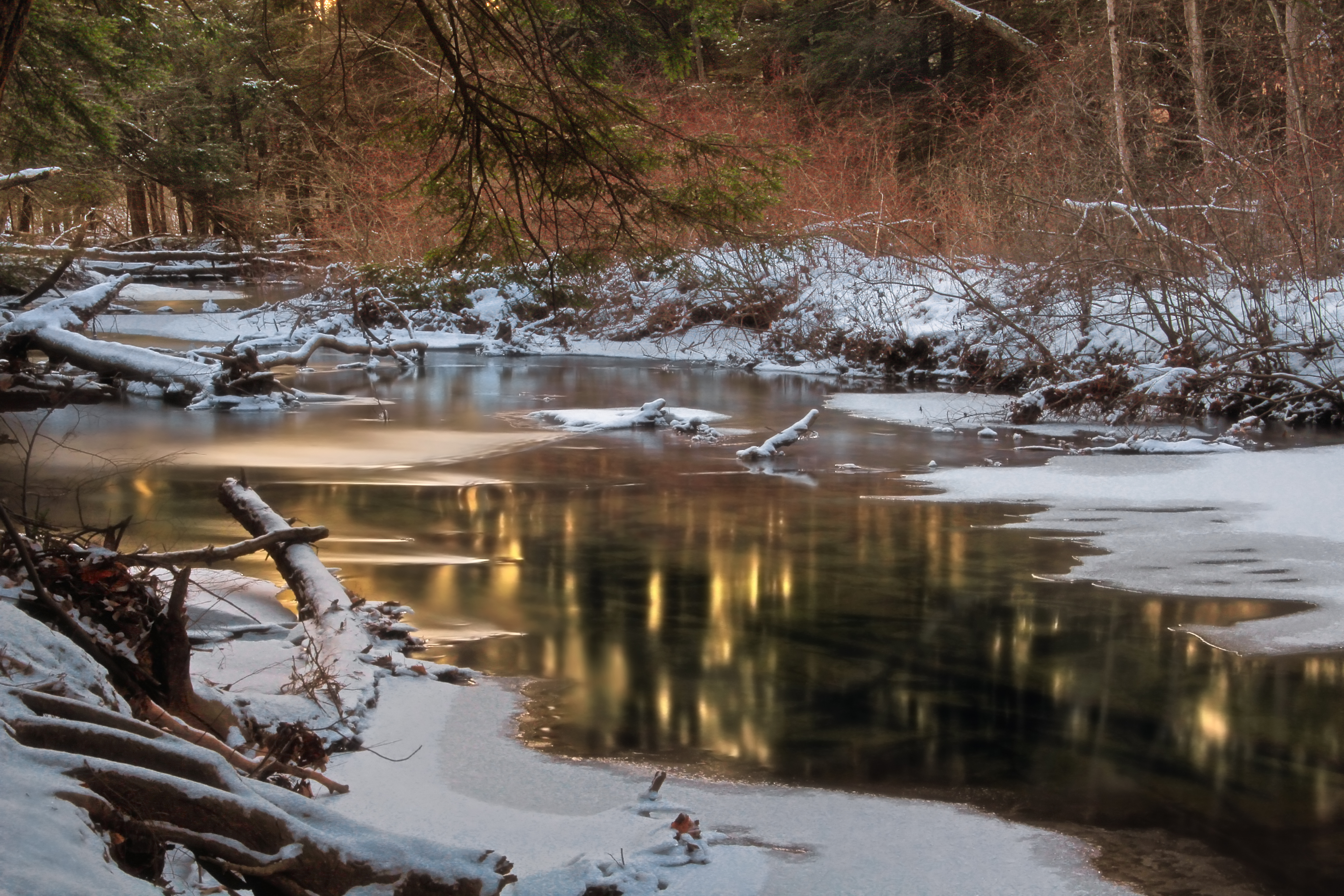
- Partially frozen Nescopeck Creek

- Location of the mouth of Nescopeck Creek in Pennsylvania
- Etymology: From a Lenape word meaning "deep black waters"

Location
- Country: United States
- State: Pennsylvania
- County: Luzerne

Physical characteristics
- Source: Olympus Pond
  - location: Dennison Township
  - coordinates: 41°05′15″N 75°50′29″W
  - elevation: 1,154 ft (352 m)
- Mouth: Susquehanna River
  - location: Nescopeck
  - coordinates: 41°03′04″N 76°13′54″W
  - elevation: 479 ft (146 m)
- Length: 37.5 mi (60.4 km)
- Basin size: 143 sq mi (370 km^{2})
- Discharge
  - location: Nescopeck, 0 miles (0 km) from mouth
  - minimum: 1 cu ft/s (0.028 m^{3}/s)

Nescopeck Creek is a 37.5-mile-long (60.4 km) tributary of the Susquehanna River in Luzerne County, Pennsylvania. The creek is in the Coal Region of Pennsylvania. The meaning of the creek's name is "deep black waters". The waters of Nescopeck Creek have difficulty ratings between Class I and Class III. However, during parts of the year, Nescopeck Creek is impossible to navigate due to rapids, flooding, and tight bends. Nescopeck Creek is home to a number of species of trout, although the waters are not always optimal for them. Nescopeck Creek's water is acidic, with a pH as low as 3.6 in some studies.

Much of the land in the Nescopeck Creek's watershed is forest. Farmland is common in the lower portions of the Nescopeck Creek watershed and the Little Nescopeck Creek watershed, while coal mines are more common on Nescopeck Creek's tributaries Black Creek, Stony Creek, and Cranberry Creek. A 6-mile (10 km) portion of Nescopeck Creek is considered a cold-water fishery of high quality. There are also seven natural areas in the creek's watershed, some of which contain rare species of plants and animals. On the Hilsenhoff Biotic Index, the streams in the watershed range from 0 to 18. There are 51 genera of macroinvertebrates in the creek's watershed. The habitats in the watershed primarily include mixed forest.

Nescopeck Creek's watershed is 143 square miles (370 km^{2}) in area and lies in parts of three counties. Slightly over half of the land in the watershed is deciduous forest. The rest is perennial herbaceous vegetation, mixed vegetation and annual herbaceous vegetation, and barren land. Some sub-watersheds contain as much as 80 percent forest. Almost all of the streams in the watershed are within 330 feet (100 m) of a road. Most of the land in the watershed has a slope of 0 to 3 percent, although there are areas with a slope of 8 percent or more.

There are five main soil series in the Nescopeck Creek watershed. These are the Hazleton-Dekalb-Buchanan series, the Wellsboro-Oquaga-Morris series, the Leck Kill-Meckesville-Calvin series, the Udorthents-Urban Land-Volusia series, and the Lackawanna-Arnot-Morris series. There are also coal veins in the watershed. The creek discharges aluminum, iron, and manganese, nitrogen, and phosphorus. The pH of the streams in the Nescopeck Creek watershed range from 4.2 to 7.2. The main stem's discharge ranged from 31.8 to 227 cubic feet per second (0.90 to 6.43 m^{3}/s) between 1919 and 1926. There are 10 dams in the watershed.

== Course ==
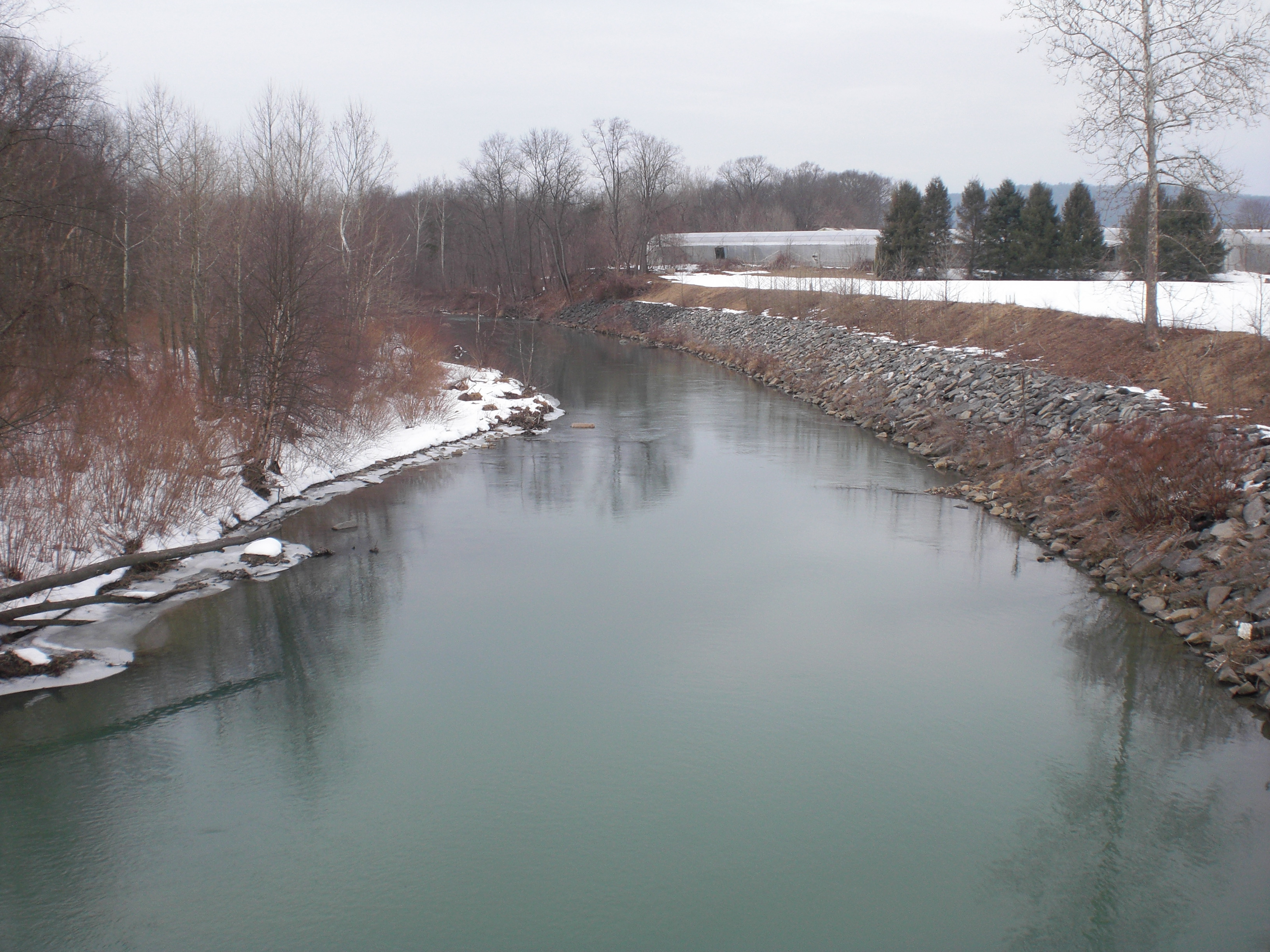
Nescopeck Creek not far from its mouth, looking downstream

Nescopeck Creek begins in Dennison Township, Luzerne County, Pennsylvania, at the confluence of an outlet of Olympus Pond and Creasy Creek. The creek's source is also on the eastern edge of Mount Yeager. It flows northwest for a short distance before passing through Olympus Pond and turning west. For the next several miles the creek continues in this direction, running through Pennsylvania State Game Lands #18 and receiving tributaries such as Reilly Creek and Little Nescopeck Creek A. Eventually, the creek passes the northwestern edge of Mount Yeager and continues into Butler Township. Here, the creek heads southwest at a more southerly angle, crossing Interstate 80, receiving Oley Creek, and passing an area of strip mines. A few miles later, the creek turns west-southwest and crosses Pennsylvania Route 309. Continuing onwards, it passes the communities of Rumbels and St. Johns and then crosses Interstate 81. Several miles later, the creek leaves Butler Township and enters Sugarloaf Township. It continues west in this township, receiving the tributary Little Nescopeck Creek B, crossing Pennsylvania Route 93, and making several meanders. After a number of miles, the creek meanders into Black Creek Township, where it turns north and picks up the tributary Black Creek right before crossing Interstate 80 and flowing through a gap in Nescopeck Mountain. In the gap, the creek crosses from Black Creek Township into Nescopeck Township, where it meanders northwest, passing the borough of Nescopeck and entering the Susquehanna River on the border between Nescopeck Township and Columbia County.

=== Tributaries ===
Nescopeck Creek has more than 200 miles (320 km) of tributaries. This consists of 111 miles (179 km) of named streams and 106 miles (171 km) of unnamed ones. Major streams include Black Creek, two tributaries named Little Nescopeck Creek, Oley Creek, Creasy Creek, and Long Run. There are 13 named streams in the Nescopeck Creek watershed.

The portion of Nescopeck Creek from its mouth upstream to the mouth of Black Creek has a Strahler number of 5. This makes up 8.7 miles (14.0 km) of the streams in the watershed. Most of Black Creek and almost all of Nescopeck Creek upstream of Black Creek has a Strahler number of 4. These make up 43.2 miles (69.5 km) of streams in the creek's watershed. Eight smaller tributaries in the watershed have Strahler number of three. These make up 14.5 miles (23.3 km) of the creek's watershed. A total of 25 streams in the creek's watershed have a Strahler number of 2. They make up 47.4 miles (76.3 km) of the creek's watershed. One hundred thirteen very small streams in the Nescopeck Creek watershed have a Strahler number of 1. Such streams make up 104.7 miles (168.5 km) of the creek's watershed.

Little Nescopeck Creek A is one tributary of Nescopeck Creek. Its source is at the very northwestern edge of the creek's watershed, and it joins the main stem of Nescopeck Creek slightly downstream of Olympus Pond. Little Nescopeck Creek B is in the south of the watershed and is slightly longer than Little Nescopeck Creek A. Little Nescopeck Creek B joins Nescopeck Creek at Sybertsville. Black Creek is the longest tributary of Nescopeck Creek, with a length of 24.1 miles (38.8 km). Reilly Creek is a tributary of Nescopeck Creek in the extreme east of the creek's watershed. Only 2 miles (3.2 km) long, it is the shortest named tributary of Nescopeck Creek.

Kester Creek in Luzerne County is listed Class A Wild Trout Waters.

== Hydrology ==
=== Discharge ===
From 1919 to 1926, the discharge of Nescopeck Creek at St. Johns was 93.9 cubic feet per second (2.66 m^{3}/s). The month with the highest average discharge during this time was March, when there was a discharge of 227 cubic feet per second (6.4 m^{3}/s). The month with the lowest average discharge during this time was September, when there was an average discharge of 31.8 cubic feet per second (0.90 m^{3}/s). The highest discharge in a single month was 479 cubic feet per second (13.6 m^{3}/s) in March 1920. The lowest discharge in a single month was 12.9 cubic feet per second (0.37 m^{3}/s) in September 1922. The average discharge of Nescopeck Creek from 1995 to 2002 is 93.7 cubic feet per second (2.65 m^{3}/s). From 1996 to 1998, the Jeddo Tunnel discharged an average of 79.4 cubic feet per second (2.25 m^{3}/s) of water into Little Nescopeck Creek.

=== Dams ===
There are ten dams on Nescopeck Creek's watershed. The impoundments behind these dams have surface areas of 3 to 154 acres (1.2 to 62.3 ha). Nine of the dams in the Nescopeck Creek watershed are made from earthen-fill. The tenth is an unnamed dam constructed of masonry. The dams range from 12 to 41 feet (3.7 to 12.5 m) in height and 340 to 1,500 feet (100 to 460 m) in length. Their drainage areas are between 0.6 and 8.41 square miles (1.6 and 21.8 km^{2}).

=== pH and contaminants ===
In 2005, a study was done on the pH of the waters of Nescopeck Creek and its tributaries. At three sites, its pH averaged 5.06, 4.85, and 4.49. However, the pH at Nescopeck Creek's headwaters is between 6.5 and 7. The lowest pH level in the Nescopeck Creek watershed is 4.2, which is on some parts of Black Creek. Creasy Creek is the most alkaline tributary of Nescopeck Creek, with a pH ranging from 6.9 to 7.2. Other relatively alkaline streams in the creek's watershed include Long Run (6.6), Reilly Creek (6.4), Long Hollow (6.4), Oley Creek (6.4), Conety Run (6.2), and Little Nescopeck Creek A (5.8 to 7). Brook trout are able to tolerate pHs down to 4.8 and the ideal pH range for freshwater fish is 6.5 to 9.0.

At these sites, the study also found averages of 1.7, 2.23, and 5.56 parts per million of aluminum, respectively. Concentrations of aluminium higher than 100 to 200 parts per million can cause suffocation of fish by accumulating in their gills. The toxicity of aluminum to fish is increased by a water pH of below 4.5 to 6.5. There were also 0.65, 0.81, and 1.84 parts per million of iron in these sites, and 0.96, 1.15, 0.03, and 2.65 parts per million of manganese. There were 91.37, 114.27, and 274.1 milligrams per liter of sulfates in the waters of Nescopeck at these sites.

A total of 318 metric tons (351 short tons) of nitrogen per year are discharged from Nescopeck Creek. Thirty-three percent of this came from land, 60 percent from groundwater, and 6 percent from leaking septic tanks. Its Black Creek tributary adds toxic amounts of copper, lead, and zinc to Nescopeck Creek's watershed. In most parts of Nescopeck Creek and its tributaries, the concentration of phosphorus is slightly lower than the concentration of nitrogen. However, at St. Johns and Conyngham, the phosphorus level is considerably higher than the nitrogen level. Most phosphorus contributed to Nescopeck Creek comes from sub-watersheds instead of the main stem of the creek. The total amount of phosphorus in Nescopeck Creek is 16,259.5 kilograms (35,846 lb). Cropland and quarries are the largest land sources of phosphorus in the watershed, each contributing 6,226.6 kilograms (13,727 lb) (43.6 percent of land sources) and 2,109.6 kilograms (4,651 lb). The smallest sources of phosphorus in the watershed are unpaved roads, contributing 11.8 kilograms (26 lb) (0.1 percent) and mixed forest, contributing 28.3 kilograms (62 lb) (0.2 percent). Groundwater contributes 1,858.3 kilograms (4,097 lb) and septic systems contribute 135.1 kilograms (298 lb). Point source pollution in the watershed does not release any phosphorus.

Stony Creek's water is the hardest water in the Nescopeck Creek watershed, with a concentration of over 100 milligrams per liter of dissolved minerals. Other streams in the watershed with hard water are Reilly Creek (28 milligrams per liter) and Long Run (21 milligrams per liter). Some of the least hard waters in the Nescopeck Creek watershed are those of Little Nescopeck Creek A (3 to 8 milligrams per liter), Conety Run (5 milligrams per liter), and Oley Creek (7 milligrams per liter). However, the largest source of pollution in the Nescopeck Creek watershed is acid mine drainage (AMD).

Above Little Nescopeck Creek B, Nescopeck Creek's iron concentration is 110 micrograms per liter and the creek's aluminum concentration is 40 micrograms per liter. Below Little Nescopeck Creek B, however, these values increase to 1260 micrograms per liter for iron and 7450 micrograms per liter for aluminum.

The vulnerability of groundwater to pollution in the Nescopeck Creek watershed has been measured using the DRASTIC system. It is lowest in the headwaters, as well as patches near the creek's mouth, with a value of 69 to 90. Values of 91 to 104 occur in the northern part of the watershed, as well as in scattered patches in the western part. Values of 105 to 115 occur in the southern, southwestern, and part of the central part of the watershed. Some areas with values 116 and higher are scattered throughout the watershed except near the headwaters.

== Geology ==
Nescopeck Creek has coal veins near its source. These coal veins first appeared 300 million years ago. The thickness of these coal seams ranges from 3 feet (0.9 m) in the Tracy Bed up to 50 to 114 feet (15 to 35 m) in the Mammoth Bed. Nearly all of the Eastern Middle coal field is in the watershed of Nescopeck Creek. Sugarloaf Mountain is near Nescopeck Creek. Nescopeck Creek has a number of rapids. At its mouth, Nescopeck Creek carries 914.9 pounds (415.0 kg) of aluminum, 1,285 pounds (583 kg) of iron, and 1,127 pounds (511 kg) of manganese per day.

Nescopeck Creek is in the geological region known as the Ridge and Valley region. This region is characterized by fertile valleys and steep ridges. However, the eastern reaches of the Nescopeck Creek watershed are near the border of the Appalachian Plateau region.

Nescopeck Creek's watershed contains several major rock formations. These are the Mauch Chunk Formation, the Llewellyn Formation, the Pocono Formation, and the Pottsville Formation. The Mauch Chunk Formation is associated with large amounts of high-quality groundwater. This formation consists of a 3,000-foot (910 m) layer of shale, sandstone, and silt. It is situated under the Hazleton valley. The Mauch Chunk Formation contains outcrops of reddish rock. This formation is softer than many of the nearby rock formations. This formation makes up Sugarloaf Mountain and most of the Nescopeck Creek watershed. The Llewellyn Formation contains more coal than any other formation in the Nescopeck Creek watershed. This formation is 1,500 feet (460 m) thick and is composed of brownish-gray sandstone, siltstone, and shale. Buck Mountain, Mammoth Mountain, and Gamma Mountain are all carved out of the Llewellyn Formation and contain coal seams. The formation was once extensive but has been worn down by erosion over millions of years. The Pottsville Formation also contains a large number of aquifers. This formation is 250 to 300 feet (76 to 91 m) thick, and is composed of gray conglomerate and sandstone. While there is no anthracite in the Pottsville Formation, it does contain three-foot seams of other varieties of coal. Groundwater from this formation is acidic and high in manganese and iron. The Pottsville Formation makes up the valleys directly surrounding Nescopeck Creek. The Pocono Formation consists of conglomerate and sandstone and surrounds the Pottsville Formation. The rock formations are typically more varied in the northern and western part of the watershed than the southern part.

There are also several less significant rock formations in Nescopeck Creek's watershed. These include the Spechty Kopf Formation, the Hamilton Formation, and the Catskill Formation. Little is understood about the Spechty Kopf Formation, but it occurs between the Catskill and Pocono Formations. The Catskill Formation is grayish-red shale, siltstone, and sandstone.

A total of 246,594 metric tons (271,823 short tons) of material have eroded into Nescopeck Creek. Black Creek has the most erosion for an individual stream in the Nescopeck Creek watershed, with 123,825 metric tons (136,494 short tons) of erosion. The main stem of Nescopeck Creek and Little Nescopeck Creek B also have high amounts of erosion, with 74,365 metric tons (81,973 short tons) and 44,876 metric tons (49,467 short tons), respectively.

=== Soils ===
The most common soil series in the Nescopeck Creek watershed is the Hazleton-Dekalb-Buchanan series. Twenty-six percent of Nescopeck Creek's watershed contains this soil series. Much soil and bedrock in this series has been removed during mining operations. This soil series occurs in the southern part of the Nescopeck Creek watershed, near tributaries such as Black Creek and Stony Creek. The soils in this soil series are highly permeable.

Approximately 24 percent of the creek's watershed contains the Wellsboro-Oquaga-Morris series. The series is made of Wellsboro soils, Oquaga soils, and some Morris soils. This type of soil series is most common near the creek's source. Another twenty-four percent of the Nescopeck Creek watershed is made up of the Leck Kill-Meckesville-Calvin series. This soil series tends to occur on hillsides near streams. The Leck Kill-Meckesville-Calvin series occurs quite near the mouth of Nescopeck Creek, with a large patch further upstream, and a small patch in the southwestern part of the Nescopeck Creek watershed.

Eleven percent of Nescopeck Creek's watershed is made up of the Udorthents-Urban Land-Volusia series. There is some urban development over lands containing the soil series. Other areas where this soil series occurs have been surface-mined. The limiting factor for plant growth in this series is the rocky surface and the depth of the bedrock below. The Udorthents-Urban Land-Volusia soil series occurs in the southeastern and parts of the southwestern parts of the Nescopeck Creek watershed. The Lackawanna-Arnot-Morris series is present in nine percent of Nescopeck Creek's watershed. The Lackawanna-Arnot-Morris soil series mostly is near Nescopeck Creek's source, but there is some of it in the central Nescopeck Creek watershed.

== Watershed ==
Nescopeck Creek's watershed is 143 square miles (370 km^{2}) in area. Most of the watershed is in Luzerne County, but part of it also extends into Schuylkill and Columbia Counties. Nescopeck Creek's watershed area includes one city, five boroughs, and thirteen townships. Most of the land in the Nescopeck Creek watershed, except for area near its source, is publicly owned. Thirteen percent of the land in the Nescopeck Creek watershed is owned by the state of Pennsylvania.

Fifty-seven percent of the Nescopeck Creek watershed is composed of deciduous forest. Areas of perennial herbaceous vegetation make up 11 to 12 percent of the creek's watershed. Additionally, there are scattered patches of mixed vegetation and annual herbaceous vegetation in the northwestern part of the Nescopeck Creek watershed. Four to seven percent of the Nescopeck Creek watershed consists of mines, quarries, and gravel pits. A total of 95 percent of the Nescopeck Creek watershed is rural. The remaining 5 percent is suburban or urban. Twenty-seven percent of the streams in the Nescopeck Creek watershed are near surface-mining operations and 73 percent are not. Most developed land tends to be located in the southern part of the watershed, while most undeveloped land is in the northern part of the watershed.

All sub-watersheds of the Nescopeck Creek watershed contain at least 50 percent forest. A number of streams in the upper Nescopeck Creek watershed, in fact, have more than 80 percent forest coverage. Only 55 percent of the Black Creek watershed is covered by forest. Most sub-watersheds of Nescopeck Creek have only a small amount of barren land. However, the Cranberry Creek watershed contains 6.5 percent barren land, the Black Creek watershed contains 14 percent, and the Stony Creek watershed contains 30 percent. The Little Nescopeck Creek watershed contains 30 percent farmland and the Nescopeck Creek watershed contains 24 percent. Other sub-watersheds of Nescopeck Creek range from 2 to 13 percent farmland.

There are 910 miles (1,460 km) of roads in the Nescopeck Creek watershed. Forty percent of the creek's length is within 100 feet (30 m) of a road. Eighty-seven percent of Nescopeck Creek's length is within 332 feet (101 m) of a road. There are 286 miles (460 km) of roads in Nescopeck Creek's main stem sub-watershed. There are 253 miles (407 km) of roads in the Black Creek sub-watershed. The Long Run and Little Nescopeck Creek sub-watersheds also contain close to 122 and 113 miles (196 and 182 km) of roads, respectively.

=== Terrain ===
Most of the Nescopeck Creek watershed is flat, with a slope of 0 to 3 percent. There are two major lines of hills in the watershed, one of which is in the northern part and the other of which is in the central part of the watershed. These lines of hills have a slope of 3 to 8 percent. In both of the lines of hills, there are patches where the slope is 8 to 15 percent and in the northern line of hills, there is an area with a slope of over 15 percent.

The elevation at Nescopeck Creek's mouth and along Nescopeck Creek for a few miles upstream is in the range of 490 to 659 feet (149 to 201 m) above sea level. The elevation of the creek's watershed north of the northernmost line of hills is in the range of 663 to 994 feet (202 to 303 m). The central part of the Nescopeck Creek watershed, south of the northernmost line of hills, including the mouth of Black Creek, is also in this range. The area close to the main stem of the creek upstream to several miles from the source is in the range of 997 to 1,161 feet (304 to 354 m). In the central part of the Nescopeck Creek watershed, several tributaries also lie in this elevation range. Near the creek's source, its elevation is in the range of 1,165 to 1,496 feet (355 to 456 m). The central part of the Black Creek watershed is also in this range, as is much of the Nescopeck Creek watershed's northernmost line of hills. Nescopeck Creek's elevation within 2 miles (3.2 km) of its source is in the range of 1,499 to 1,831 feet (457 to 558 m). The upper portion of the Black Creek watershed and the southeastern part of the Nescopeck Creek watershed is also in this range. Scattered parts of the creek's watershed, such as its southwestern corner and the creek's source, are in the elevation range of 1,834 to 2,000 feet (559 to 610 m).

The Long Hollow sub-watershed is Nescopeck Creek is Nescopeck Creek's smallest sub-watershed, with an area of 1.1 square miles (2.8 km^{2}). The main stem of Nescopeck Creek has the largest sub-watershed, with an area of 67.3 square miles (174 km^{2}). The Black Creek sub-watershed is Nescopeck Creek's second-largest sub-watershed. The Little Nescopeck Creek A at 14 square miles (36 km^{2}), Little Nescopeck Creek B at 8.4 square miles (22 km^{2}), Cranberry Creek at 8.4 square miles (22 km^{2}), and Oley Creek at 7.2 square miles (19 km^{2}) are also among the largest Nescopeck Creek sub-watersheds.

== History ==
=== Native American inhabitation ===
Nescopeck Creek's name comes from a Lenape word meaning "deep black waters". Historically, two tribes of Native Americans known as the Fork Indians and the Delaware Indians lived near the mouth of Nescopeck Creek. Other parts of the Nescopeck Creek watershed were settled by Lenni Lenape Indians. The Lenni Lenape inhabited the Nescopeck Creek watershed a thousand years before European settlers. There is no definitive record of permanent settlements in the interior of Nescopeck Creek's watershed, but temporary Native American settlements existed in what is now Nescopeck State Park. By the 1700s, the Lenni Lenape had left the Nescopeck Creek watershed due to encroaching Iroquois and European settlers.

There were two major Native American trails in the Nescopeck Creek watershed. These were the Lehigh Path, which is also known as the Warrior Trail, and the Trade Trail. Parts of these trails would become Vine Street and Broad Street in Hazleton, respectively.

=== European inhabitation ===
In the early 1700s, some European settlers, who were granted warrants by William Penn, explored Native American trails in the Nescopeck Creek watershed. On these paths, skirmishes occasionally occurred between settlers and Native Americans. One example is the Sugarloaf Massacre, when a group of Native Americans ambushed some soldiers on the Lehigh Path near Nescopeck Creek in 1780. The first mill was built in the Nescopeck Creek watershed in 1788. By 1791, there were four settlers along Nescopeck Creek. In 1795, Samuel Mifflin built a sawmill at the mouth of Nescopeck Creek. A gristmill was built on Nescopeck Creek the same year. A flood of Nescopeck Creek in 1786, known as the Pumpkin Flood, was noted for sweeping large numbers of pumpkins downstream on the creek.

Light industries, such as lumbering and tanning, gradually developed in the Nescopeck Creek watershed. This led to the creation of numerous communities in the Nescopeck Creek watershed, such as White Haven, Freeland, and Hazleton. Additionally, anthracite coal was discovered in 1813. Coal became an important industry for the Nescopeck Creek region by 1836 with the formation of the Hazleton Coal Company. In the 1830s and 1840s, a number of "patch towns" designed to attend mines were built in the Nescopeck Creek watershed. The population in the Nescopeck Creek watershed began to increase rapidly around this time. By the 1880s, the patch towns attended over thirty mines in the watershed. However, the coal mining industry in the watershed began to lose value around this time, coal mining was no longer a significant source of industry in the Nescopeck Creek watershed by 1936.

In 1830, a forge which made bar iron was built on Nescopeck Creek. The most destructive flood on Nescopeck Creek occurred in 1850, when a dam on the creek was breached, killing 22 people. From 1858 to 1870 there was a tannery on Nescopeck Creek. In 1828, plans for a canal in Nescopeck Creek were made. In 1885, a number of French Indian artifacts, which were Plaster of Paris casts for making sculptures, were discovered along Nescopeck Creek in Dennison Township.

In 1891 the first part of the Jeddo Tunnel, a tunnel in the Nescopeck Creek watershed, was built. The last tunnel in this system was built in 1932. These tunnels drain more than 32 square miles (83 km^{2}), of which 13 square miles (34 km^{2}) contain coal basins.

A dam on Nescopeck Creek was destroyed during Hurricane Agnes in 1972. In the early 1900s, there was a steam-electric power station at the mouth of Nescopeck Creek. The Wilkes-Barre and Hazleton Railway passed over Nescopeck Creek in the beginning of the 1900s. The Jeddo Tunnel, which drained a colliery in the 20th century, emptied into Nescopeck Creek. After World War II, there was a large increase in unemployment rates in the Nescopeck Creek watershed due to the failing coal mining industry. From 1919 to 1926, the United States Geological Survey had a station on Nescopeck Creek near the community of St. Johns. Two other stream gauging stations have been built on Nescopeck Creek. One of these stations, which was in use from 1949 to 1950 was in Nescopeck. The other, which was in use from 1963 to 1970, was 0.6 miles upstream of Nescopeck Creek's mouth. In the 1990s, some people were caught stealing Native American artifacts at the Nescopeck Creek headwaters.

== Biology ==
Nescopeck Creek is home to brown trout and brook trout near its source, but does not have much life further downstream because coal mine waste in Little Nescopeck Creek pollutes the lower reaches of Nesocpeck Creek. In 1999, a study discovered 20 species of fish living in the Nescopeck Creek watershed. Of these, 15 had been observed before in the watershed, and five had not. Nesopeck Creek and its various tributaries are rated Class A to Class D for wild trout. There are a number of riparian buffers on Nescopeck Creek, of which 80 percent consist of forest. Along parts of Nescopeck Creek, there are a large number of shrub-like oak trees. In the Nescopeck Creek watershed, there are prolific forests of oak, chestnut, and hemlock trees.

The entire Nescopeck Creek watershed has a high level of biodiversity, with the most diverse areas being Arbutus Peak, the Edgewood vernal pools, and the Nescopeck Creek valley. The creek's southeastern corner contains the highest density of amphibian species in its watershed. The highest density of snake species in the watershed is in the same area. The lowest density of snake species in the watershed is along the central part of Nescopeck Creek. The highest density of bird species in the watershed is in the southern and central part of the watershed. The highest density of mammal species in the watershed is at Nescopeck Creek's headwaters.

In the Nescopeck Creek watershed, there are seven natural areas. These are Arbutus Peak, Valmont Industrial Park, the Black Creek flats, the Humboldt barrens, the Nescopeck Creek valley, and the Edgewood vernal pools. Arbutus Peak is a 5,000-to-6,000-acre (2,000 to 2,400 ha) area at Nescopeck Creek's headwaters. Also, the Nescopeck Barrens are home to 15 rare species of plants and animals. The Nescopeck Creek valley also contains a number of rare species. The Edgewood vernal pools provide a breeding ground for wood frogs and Jefferson salamanders.

The Bird Community Index, a measure of the quality of a habitat based on the presence of songbirds, has been tested for most of the watershed of Nescopeck Creek. The Bird Community Index was high in one area near the source of Nescopeck Creek. In all other areas of the watershed, the index was low to medium. One of the lowest values is near Nescopeck Creek's mouth. The Hilsenhoff Biotic Index (HBI) has been measured for a number of sites along Nescopeck Creek and its tributaries. Upstream of the Jeddo Tunnel, Little Nescopeck Creek B has a high HBI. However, just downstream of the Jeddo Tunnel, the HBI drops off by a large amount. Black Creek has an HBI of 0 to 6.6, and this tributary's biodiversity is lower at its headwaters than at its confluence with Nescopeck Creek. Nescopeck Creek's HBI is from 1.7 to 5.4, depending on the site. In Nescopeck Creek, the total number of macroinvertebrate taxa at several sites ranges from 5 to 26. In Little Nescopeck Creek, the values range from 1 to 18. In Black Creek, the number ranges from 0 to 11.

In 1999, the only Class-A fishery waters in the Nescopeck Creek watershed were those of Little Nescopeck Creek A, the headwaters of Nescopeck Creek, and several minor tributaries of Nescopeck Creek. Only one small stream near Nescopeck Creek's mouth had Class-C fishery waters. The central part of Nescopeck Creek, as well as most of Black Creek had Class-D fishery waters. There were twenty species of fish in Nescopeck Creek in 1999. Of these, seventeen had been seen in the watershed before. However, since between a 1999 study of the watershed and the study before that, the brown bullhead and the bluegill fish had vanished from the Nescopeck Creek watershed.

A large number of genera of macroinvertebrates have been discovered in and around Nescopeck Creek. These consist of one genus of segmented worm, one genus of sowbugs, 11 genera of mayflies, 8 genera of stone flies, 11 genera of caddisflies, 6 genera of dragonflies, 2 genera of helgrammites, 10 genera of beetles, and one genus of fly.

There are a total of 14 species of amphibians in the Nescopeck Creek watershed, of which 11 breed in the watershed. These species consist of 6 salamanders, 6 frogs, one newt, and one toad. There are seven species of reptiles in the watershed, of which five breed there. Five of these species are snakes and two are turtles. The biodiversity of birds in the watershed is much greater than that of amphibians or reptiles; there are approximately one hundred different species of birds in the Nescopeck Creek watershed. A total of 29 mammals have been observed in the creek's watershed, including three species of bats, two species of mice, and two species of foxes.

=== Habitats ===
The most common habitat in the Nescopeck Creek watershed is the dry-oak mixed forest. Common trees in this habitat include northern red oak, white oak, and chestnut oak. This habitat also contains gray and black birch trees. Pine, hemlock, and some types of oak trees are found on the higher parts of this habitat. Lower to the ground are huckleberry, teaberry, blueberry, and hawthorn and other plants. The wildflowers in this habitat include wild onion and wild strawberries.

In the Nescopeck Creek watershed, pitch pine – scrub oak forests occur on Arbutus Peak and several barren areas in the southern part of watershed. In this type of forest, pitch pine, scrub oak, black oak and chestnut oak are the main trees. Bracken fern, teaberry, black chokeberry, blueberry, and huckleberry are the most common shrubs in this habitat.

All of the streams in the Nescopeck Creek are considered sub-optimal habitats and rated on a scale of 1 to 240. The most optimal water habitat in the watershed is a site along Nescopeck Creek, with a rating of 184. The least optimal water habitats in the watershed are two sites along Black Creek. These sites are considered poor to marginal habitats, with ratings of 56 and 96 respectively.

== Recreation ==
Nescopeck State Park is one source of recreation in the Nescopeck Creek watershed. Nescopeck Creek flows through this state park and on it there are opportunities for trout fishing. Nescopeck Creek takes up 3,350 acres (1,360 ha) of the northwestern part in the Nescopeck Creek watershed. Additionally, there are four golf courses, two community parks, and two Pennsylvania State Game Lands, and ten sites for water-based recreation, including Lake Francis in Nescopeck State Park. A tourist attraction, Eckley Miner's Village, is within the Nescopeck Creek watershed. A resort known as the Eagle Rock Resort is in the Nescopeck Creek watershed. Since the late 1990s, there have been plans to convert old railroad lines in the Nescopeck Creek watershed to rail trails. One such plan is to link the Hazleton area to the Delaware and Lehigh National Heritage Corridor.

== See also ==
- Briar Creek (Susquehanna River), next tributary of the Susquehanna River going downriver
- Salem Creek, next tributary of the Susquehanna River going upriver
- List of rivers of Pennsylvania
- Nescopeck State Park

== Works cited ==
- Nescopeck Creek Watershed Stewardship Report (Spring 2002). Center for Watershed Stewardship Keystone Project. University Park, Pa.: Pennsylvania State University. Retrieved July 5, 2013.
