= National Register of Historic Places listings in Luzerne County, Pennsylvania =

Location of Luzerne County in Pennsylvania

This is a list of the National Register of Historic Places listings in Luzerne County, Pennsylvania.

This is intended to be a complete list of the properties and districts on the National Register of Historic Places in Luzerne County, Pennsylvania, United States. The locations of National Register properties and districts for which the latitude and longitude coordinates are included below, may be seen in a map.

There are 38 properties and districts listed on the National Register in the county.

This National Park Service list is complete through NPS recent listings posted May 1, 2026.

== Current listings ==
	Name on the Register	Image	Date listed	Location	City or town	Description
1	Ashley Planes	Ashley Planes	January 25, 1980 (#80003562)	Off Pennsylvania Route 309; 41°11′26″N 75°54′37″W	Fairview and Hanover Townships	
2	Bear Creek Village Historic District	Bear Creek Village Historic District	October 28, 1999 (#99001287)	Pennsylvania Route 115 at Bear Creek Dam; 41°11′00″N 75°45′20″W	Bear Creek Village	
3	Bell Telephone Company of Pennsylvania – Wilkes-Barre Central Office	Bell Telephone Company of Pennsylvania – Wilkes-Barre Central Office	May 9, 2024 (#100010258)	33 E. Northampton Street; 41°14′36″N 75°53′03″W	Wilkes-Barre	
4	Bittenbender Covered Bridge	Bittenbender Covered Bridge	December 1, 1980 (#80003563)	South of Huntington Mills off Legislative Route 40076; 41°10′51″N 76°13′30″W	Huntington Township	Collapsed in 2006
5	Bridge in City of Wilkes-Barre	Bridge in City of Wilkes-Barre	June 22, 1988 (#88000828)	Legislative Route 5 over Mill Creek; 41°15′36″N 75°52′02″W	Wilkes-Barre	
6	Catlin Hall, Wilkes College	Catlin Hall, Wilkes College	March 16, 1972 (#72001132)	92 South River Street; 41°14′48″N 75°53′12″W	Wilkes-Barre	
7	Central Railroad of New Jersey Station	Central Railroad of New Jersey Station	May 12, 1975 (#75001652)	31–35 South Baltimore Street; 41°14′31″N 75°52′47″W	Wilkes-Barre	
8	Comerford Theater	Comerford Theater	December 3, 1980 (#80003564)	71 Public Square; 41°14′41″N 75°52′55″W	Wilkes-Barre	
9	Denison House	Denison House	December 2, 1970 (#70000550)	35 Denison Street; 41°17′57″N 75°51′46″W	Forty Fort	
10	Eckley Historic District	Eckley Historic District	October 26, 1971 (#71000710)	Both sides of Main Street through Eckley; 40°59′36″N 75°51′45″W	Foster Township	
11	Benjamin Evans House	Benjamin Evans House	August 25, 1983 (#83002260)	Off Pennsylvania Route 93 south of Nescopeck; 41°02′36″N 76°13′19″W	Nescopeck Township	
12	Fort Pittston School	Fort Pittston School	November 21, 2022 (#100008384)	255 North Main St. 41°19′47″N 75°47′15″W	Pittston	
13	Forty Fort Meetinghouse	Forty Fort Meetinghouse	November 3, 1988 (#88002373)	River Street and Wyoming Avenue; 41°17′04″N 75°52′18″W	Forty Fort	
14	George W. Guthrie School	George W. Guthrie School	June 27, 1980 (#80003565)	643 North Washington Street; 41°15′22″N 75°51′47″W	Wilkes-Barre	
15	Hazleton High School	Hazleton High School	April 16, 2012 (#12000222)	700 N. Wyoming St. 40°57′59″N 75°58′21″W	Hazleton	Educational Resources of Pennsylvania Multiple Property Submission
16	Hotel Altamont	Hotel Altamont	December 29, 2014 (#14001101)	145 W. Broad St. 40°57′17″N 75°58′36″W	Hazleton	
17	Kingston Armory	Kingston Armory	December 21, 1989 (#89002084)	280 Market Street; 41°15′10″N 75°53′31″W	Kingston	
18	Luzerne County Courthouse	Luzerne County Courthouse	September 4, 1980 (#80003566)	North River Street; 41°15′05″N 75°52′46″W	Wilkes-Barre	
19	Luzerne County Fresh Air Camp	Luzerne County Fresh Air Camp	February 20, 2004 (#04000064)	Middle Road, approximately 0.25 miles (0.40 km) northeast of the junction of Middle Road and Pennsylvania Route 3021; 41°00′44″N 75°59′44″W	Butler Township	
20	Luzerne Presbyterial Institute	Luzerne Presbyterial Institute	September 7, 1979 (#79002293)	Institute Street; 41°18′39″N 75°50′29″W	Wyoming	
21	Market Street Bridge	Market Street Bridge	June 22, 1988 (#88000873)	Market Street/Legislative Route 11 over the Susquehanna River; 41°14′55″N 75°53′07″W	Kingston and Wilkes-Barre	
22	Markle Banking & Trust Company Building	Markle Banking & Trust Company Building	March 28, 1996 (#96000322)	8 West Broad Street; 40°57′14″N 75°58′29″W	Hazleton	
23	McClintock Hall	McClintock Hall	March 16, 1972 (#72001133)	44 South River Street; 41°14′52″N 75°53′05″W	Wilkes-Barre	
24	Memorial Presbyterian Church	Memorial Presbyterian Church	September 18, 2017 (#100001636)	29 W. North Street; 41°15′01″N 75°52′34″W	Wilkes-Barre	
25	Israel Platt Pardee Mansion	Israel Platt Pardee Mansion	January 12, 1984 (#84003487)	235 North Laurel Street and 28 Aspen Street; 40°57′36″N 75°58′22″W	Hazleton	Designed by architect George Franklin Barber
26	River Street Historic District	River Street Historic District	September 10, 1985 (#85002328)	Franklin, River, West River, West Jackson, West Union, West Market, West Northampton, West South and West Ross Streets and Barnum Place; 41°14′49″N 75°53′09″W	Wilkes-Barre	
27	St. Gabriel's Catholic Parish Complex	St. Gabriel's Catholic Parish Complex	August 22, 2002 (#02000889)	122–142 South Wyoming Street; 40°56′55″N 75°58′20″W	Hazleton	
28	St. John the Evangelist Roman Catholic Church and School Building	St. John the Evangelist Roman Catholic Church and School Building	July 30, 2003 (#03000721)	419 North Main Street; 41°15′29″N 75°52′03″W	Wilkes-Barre	
29	St. Stanislaus Institute	St. Stanislaus Institute	December 30, 2008 (#08001267)	141 Old Newport Street; 41°11′32″N 76°01′03″W	Newport Township	
30	George W. Search House	George W. Search House	July 10, 2009 (#09000387)	56 South Main Street; 41°09′03″N 76°09′03″W	Shickshinny	
31	Stegmaier Brewery	Stegmaier Brewery	May 30, 1979 (#79002292)	Roughly bounded by Coal, Welles, Market, Lincoln and Baltimore Streets; 41°14′32″N 75°52′36″W	Wilkes-Barre	
32	Stoddartsville Historic District	Stoddartsville Historic District	November 12, 1998 (#98001373)	South side of Pennsylvania Route 115 at the Lehigh River in Stoddartsville; 41°07′47″N 75°37′42″W	Buck Township	
33	Swetland Homestead	Swetland Homestead	December 13, 1978 (#78002427)	855 Wyoming Avenue; 41°18′06″N 75°51′10″W	Wyoming	
34	Weiss Hall	Weiss Hall	November 27, 1972 (#72001134)	98 South River Street; 41°14′47″N 75°53′12″W	Wilkes-Barre	
35	West End Wheelmen's Club	West End Wheelmen's Club	May 30, 1997 (#97000521)	439 South Franklin Street; 41°14′24″N 75°53′47″W	Wilkes-Barre	
36	Wilkes-Barre Silk Company Mill	Wilkes-Barre Silk Company Mill	November 25, 2019 (#100004666)	92 S. Empire St. 41°14′03″N 75°52′21″W	Wilkes-Barre	
37	Wyoming Monument	Wyoming Monument	May 13, 2002 (#02000509)	U.S. Route 11, Wyoming Avenue and Susquehanna Street; 41°18′13″N 75°50′45″W	Wyoming	
38	Wyoming Seminary	Wyoming Seminary	August 6, 1979 (#79002291)	Sprague Avenue; 41°15′48″N 75°53′54″W	Kingston	

== Former listings ==
	Name on the Register	Image	Date listed	Date removed	Location	Municipality	Description
1	Keller House		November 13, 1976 (#76001647)	December 18, 1978	217 W. Broad St.	Hazleton	Demolished.

== See also ==
- List of National Historic Landmarks in Pennsylvania
- National Register of Historic Places listings in Pennsylvania
- List of Pennsylvania state historical markers in Luzerne County
