= Penn State Hazleton =

Public university in Sugarloaf Township, Pennsylvania, US

Coordinates: 40.983575°N 76.028738°W

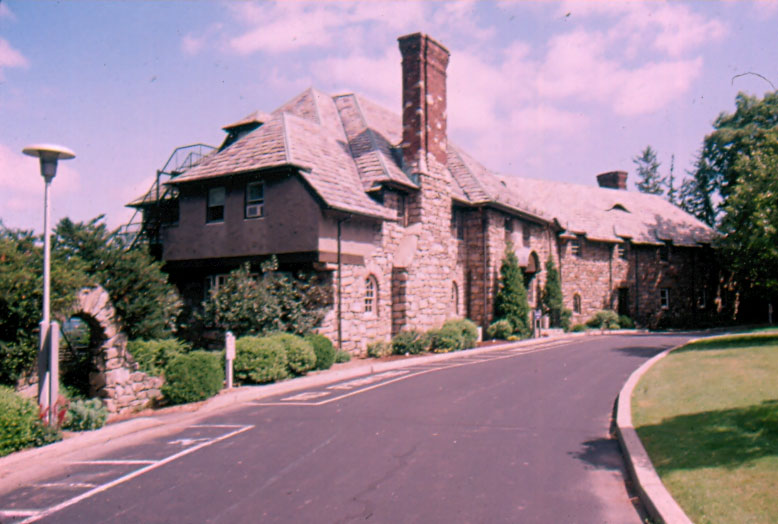
- Type: Public satellite campus
- Established: 1934
- Parent institution: Pennsylvania State University
- Affiliations: PSUAC (USCAA)
- Chancellor: Dr. Elizabeth Wright
- President: Neeli Bendapudi
- Faculty: 55 full-time; 34 part-time
- Students: 504 (Fall 2025)
- Undergraduates: 504 (Fall 2025)
- Location: Hazleton, Pennsylvania, U.S.
- Colors: Navy Blue and White
- Mascot: Nittany Lion
- Website: hazleton.psu.edu/

Penn State Hazleton is a commonwealth campus of the Pennsylvania State University located in Sugarloaf Township, Pennsylvania. It has an enrollment of 426 students as of 2021.

== History ==
Penn State Hazleton's origins trace back to 1934 during the depths of the Great Depression. Since this was a time when many people could not afford to go to college, the college came to the people. At the request of Hazleton's community leaders, a community survey was completed by the Pennsylvania State College's extension services to determine the actual extent of the need and community support for a center. Hazleton was one of 14 communities to request a center, and only four requests were fulfilled. In September 1934, the Hazleton Undergraduate Center opened with 47 full-time and 60 part-time evening students. The freshman and sophomore students began their studies in Hazleton and completed their degree at Penn State's University Park campus in State College or another institution.

Over the next several years, the center was housed in various locations—first in the upper floors of the Markle Bank Building on Broad and Wyoming Streets, then in the former Broad Street School. To accommodate the influx of men and women returning from service in World War II, additional space was leased in the A.D. Thomas Elementary School and the former Walnut Street School.

A permanent home came in December 1948 when the college purchased 26 hilltop acres (110,000 m^{2}) in Sugarloaf Township which, for nearly 25 years, had served as the residential estate of local coal baron Eckley B. Markle. Known as “Highacres,” the site consisted of four buildings that gave the college the space it so desperately needed. The estate, built by Alvan Markle Sr., featured a 32-room fieldstone mansion with every modern convenience available at the time, as well as domestic staff quarters, a greenhouse, and five formal gardens. Markle's mansion quickly became the administration building and, at various times during its life, has housed offices, classrooms, the library, health services, a kitchen, and a dining room. The domestic staff's quarters were transformed into the library, dormitory and infirmary. The greenhouse became the botany laboratory, and a new building, known today as Laurel Cottage, served as the chemistry laboratory. Over the years, many new facilities were added to Penn State Hazleton.

Today, the administration building is the most recognized Penn State Hazleton structure, serving as one of the symbols of the campus. Recently, the island in the semi-circular driveway became the home to another Penn State icon - the Nittany Lion statue, a three-fourth's scale replica of the original at University Park.

Through gifts and purchases, Penn State Hazleton now consists of 125 acres (0.51 km^{2}) of land, with the historic structures standing side-by-side with new and modern academic buildings, a manicured garden, a scenic overlook/picnic area, and a number of nature trails.

== Athletics ==
Penn State–Hazleton teams participate as a member of the United States Collegiate Athletic Association (USCAA). The Nittany Lions are a member of the Pennsylvania State University Athletic Conference (PSUAC). Men's sports include baseball, basketball, golf, soccer and tennis; while women's sports include basketball, golf, softball, tennis and volleyball.

== Residence life ==
Undergraduate demographics as of Fall 2023
Race and ethnicity	Total
White	55%
Hispanic	22%
Black	10%
Two or more races	5%
Asian	3%
International student	2%
Unknown	2%
Economic diversity
Low-income (Note: The percentage of students who received an income-based federal Pell grant intended for low-income students.)	46%
Affluent (Note: The percentage of students who are a part of the American middle class at the bare minimum.)	54%

Residence Halls

Approximately 480 students live on the Hazleton campus.

- North Hall (156)
- South Hall (220)
- West Hall (100)
