= Alvan Markle =

American banker

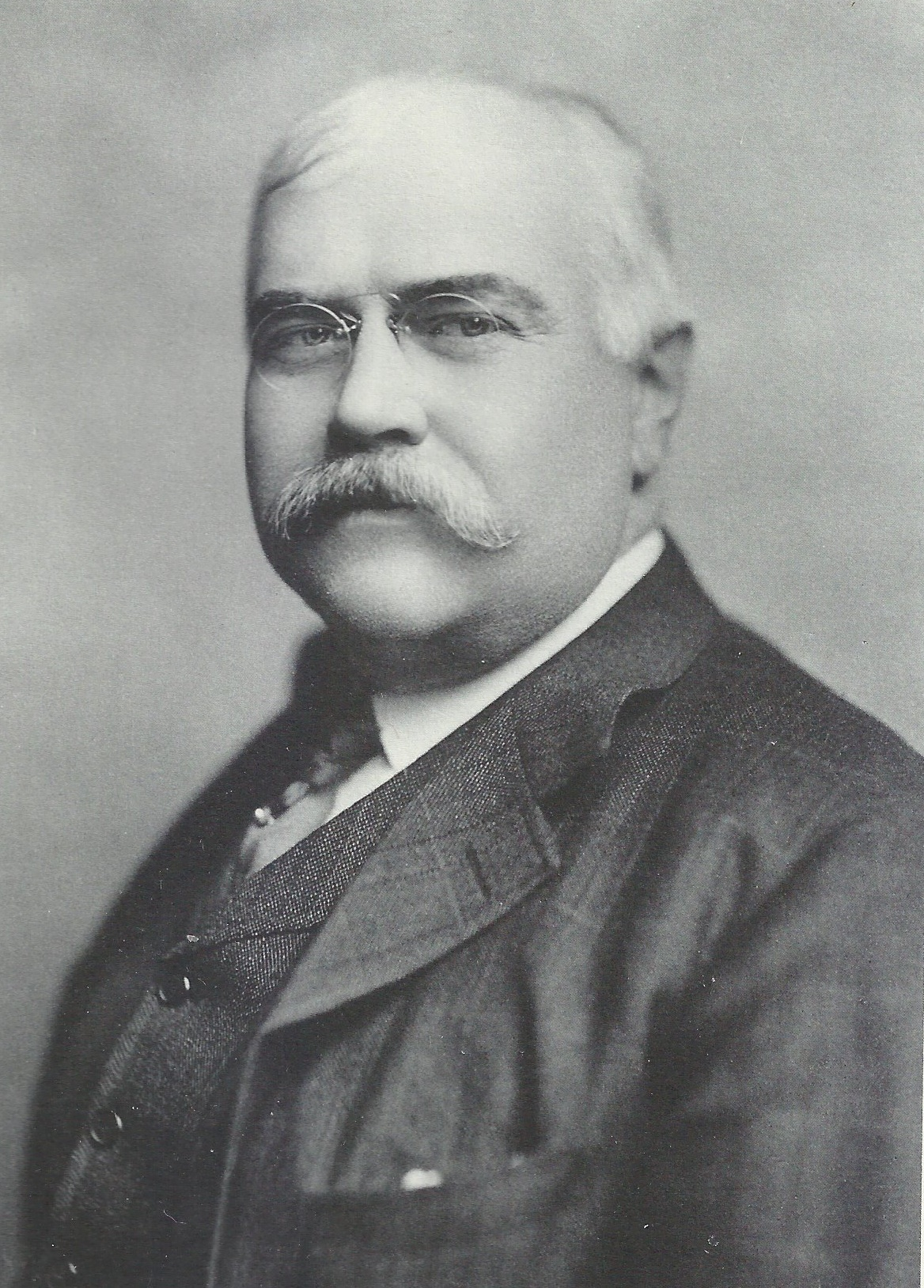
- Born: August 29, 1861; Hazleton, Pennsylvania
- Died: March 19, 1931 (aged 69); Hazleton, Pennsylvania
- Occupations: Banker, businessman, engineer, and inventor
- Known for: regional transportation systems, electric power, extraction technologies, electric third rail

Alvan Markle (August 29, 1861 – March 19, 1931) was an American banker, businessman, engineer, and inventor based in Hazleton, Pennsylvania. He was the son of George Bushar Markle (1827–1888), a rural carpenter and ingenious inventor who became a successful banker and coal operator. Alvan was the brother of John Markle, who established the John and Mary Markle Foundation. Alvan, his father, and his brothers were instrumental in making Hazleton a financial and industrial hub through their inventions and their initiative in establishing regional transportation systems, electric power, extraction technologies, as well as social and educational institutions.

== Career ==
When his father became ill in 1879, Alvan Markle left Lafayette College at the age of 18 and joined his brothers in learning and managing the family businesses. In 1882, they collaborated with Thomas Edison to build the world's sixth urban power plant in Hazleton, marking the city as a pioneer in electric power. Over the following decade Alvan Markle built the city's first electric public transportation system; by 1892 his trolley lines linked 17 isolated outlying colliery villages to the city and to 40-acre Hazle Park (set aside in 1861 by the Markle family), a notable public amenity with lake and picnic grounds that he developed as a popular amusement park.

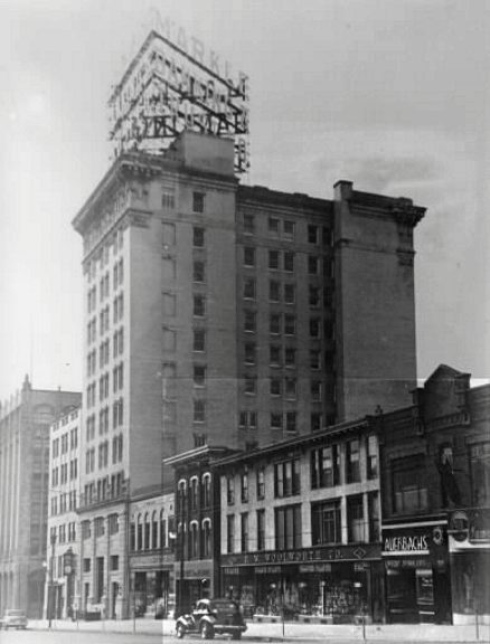
Markle Bank Building (now Hayden Tower at the Markle) in Hazleton, Pennsylvania, in 1923.

In 1899 he established an electric high speed rail line that linked the Hazleton area to the county seat of Wilkes-Barre, devising the revolutionary protected third rail system adopted nationwide by urban transportation systems and standard technology to this day. From 1886 to 1929 he managed the family banking concern, buying out his brothers in 1892, and erecting the 11-story Markle Bank and Trust Company Building in Hazleton in 1910, designed by John Irwin Bright. Constructed to be fireproof, this landmark structure acquired a prominent rooftop electric sign and a 6-story addition in 1923, and is a National Register of Historic Places site). He was also instrumental in establishing telephone service in the region.

== Corporations ==
Among the Corporations that Markle originated, organized and for which he acted as chairman of the board are the Markle Banking and Trust Co. from 1892, the Wilkes Barre and Hazleton Railroad Co. from 1902, the Lehigh Traction Company, the Hazleton Auto Bus Co., the Consolidated Telephone Co. from 1913, and the Lehigh Telephone Co. from 1924. He was also director and president of the Hazelton Manufacturing Company. He served as vice president and director of the Jeddo Highland Coal Co., and director of the Pennsylvania, New York, New Jersey Power Co.

== Public Service ==
Markle was elected chairman of the joint United Mine Workers and Anthracite Operators Committee serving in that capacity from 1909 to 1925. He served as director of United Charities of Hazleton from 1902, and director of the Pennsylvania State Chamber of Commerce from 1916. He was appointed Collector of Taxes for Hazleton and donated his commission to the Red Cross and served as special assistant to the Postmaster General for a dollar a year. During World War I he chaired Luzerne County's Public Safely Committee, the Pennsylvania Council of National Defense, and managed War Bond drives. He served on the Executive Committee of the Hazleton Public Library Association from 1902, an institution to which his brother John gave a distinguished Beaux Arts building in 1912.

== Personal life ==
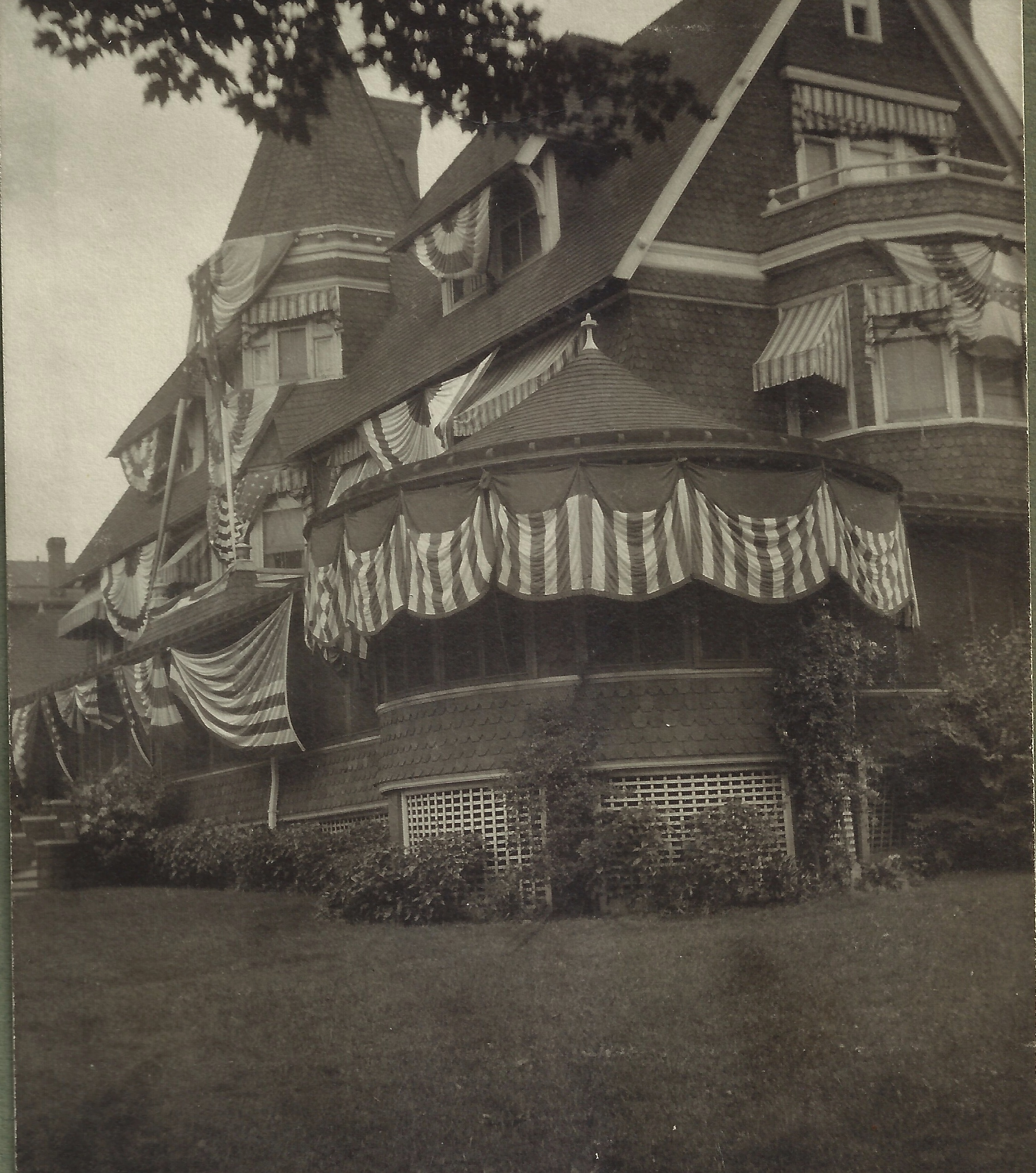
321 Broad Street, where Markle resided for most of his career

In 1887, Markle married Mary Dryfoos (1869–1945), five of their children lived to adulthood: Emily (1888–1989), Alvan Jr. (1889–1975), Donald (1892–1977), Eckley (1894–1961), and John (1902–1986). Always eager to experiment, in 1898, Alvan acquired the first car seen in Hazleton, Pennsylvania, and one of the first in the country.

=== Homes ===
During much of his career Markle resided at 321 Broad Street, Hazleton, a large shingle-style frame structure built in 1887. This house became the home of Hazleton Elks, of which Markle was Exalted Ruler in 1891, when he moved 4 miles out of the city to his estate at Highacres in 1924.

Markle began improvements at the 66-acre forested mountaintop estate at Conyngham Pass that he named "Highacres" in 1915. Desiring a fireproof residence, Markle devised with the structure's notable architect, John Russell Pope, revolutionary poured-in-place concrete walls faced and embedded with native fieldstones. The property included terraced gardens, greenhouses, a 6-car garage with apartments, other outbuildings, and a technologically innovative 32-room home.

=== Family Legacy ===
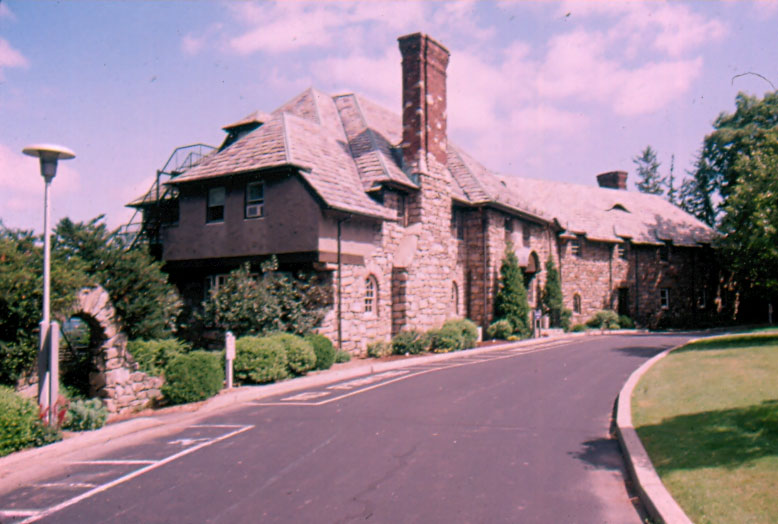
Highacres, now the site of Penn State Hazleton

==== Highacres becomes Penn State Hazleton ====
Beyond the public infrastructure and corporate financing that enabled Hazleton to grow and modernize between the 1880s and the 1920s, the Markle family participation in the region remains visible in three notable structures: the Markle Bank Building (now Hayden Tower at the Markle), the Markle Memorial Library (1912; now Hazleton Public Library), and Highacres (1924; now Penn State Hazleton).

In 1948, Alvan Markle, Jr. was alerted to the needs of the newly established Hazelton Undergraduate Center of Penn State University an institution that had been hosted in its earliest days in the 1930s in the Markle Bank Building. Markle, Jr. saw the potential for an expansive campus at Highacres.

He persuaded his brother Eckley Markle, a pioneering World War I aviator, to give Penn State Hazleton 60 acres on the Highacres site. Six further acres with three buildings were sold by Eckley to Penn State on generous terms specifically for educational purposes. In 1968, their brother Donald Markle increased the campus with the gift of his adjoining thirty-one acre estate "Norwinds." In 1998, Eckley's widow Hazel R. Markle (1908–1969) gave six further mountaintop acres to Penn State.

More recently, heirs of Markle's uncle, Stephen Decatur Engle (1837–1921) who had collaborated with the Markle brothers on the Edison electrification project, gave a further 25 acres to the campus. The Markle family gifts constitute 122 acres of the 148-acre campus.

== See also ==
- Penn State Hazleton
- John Russell Pope
- Stephen Decatur Engle
- The John and Mary Markle Foundation
- The Markle Bank Building
