= Wyoming, Pennsylvania =

Borough in Luzerne County, Pennsylvania, US

- Borough
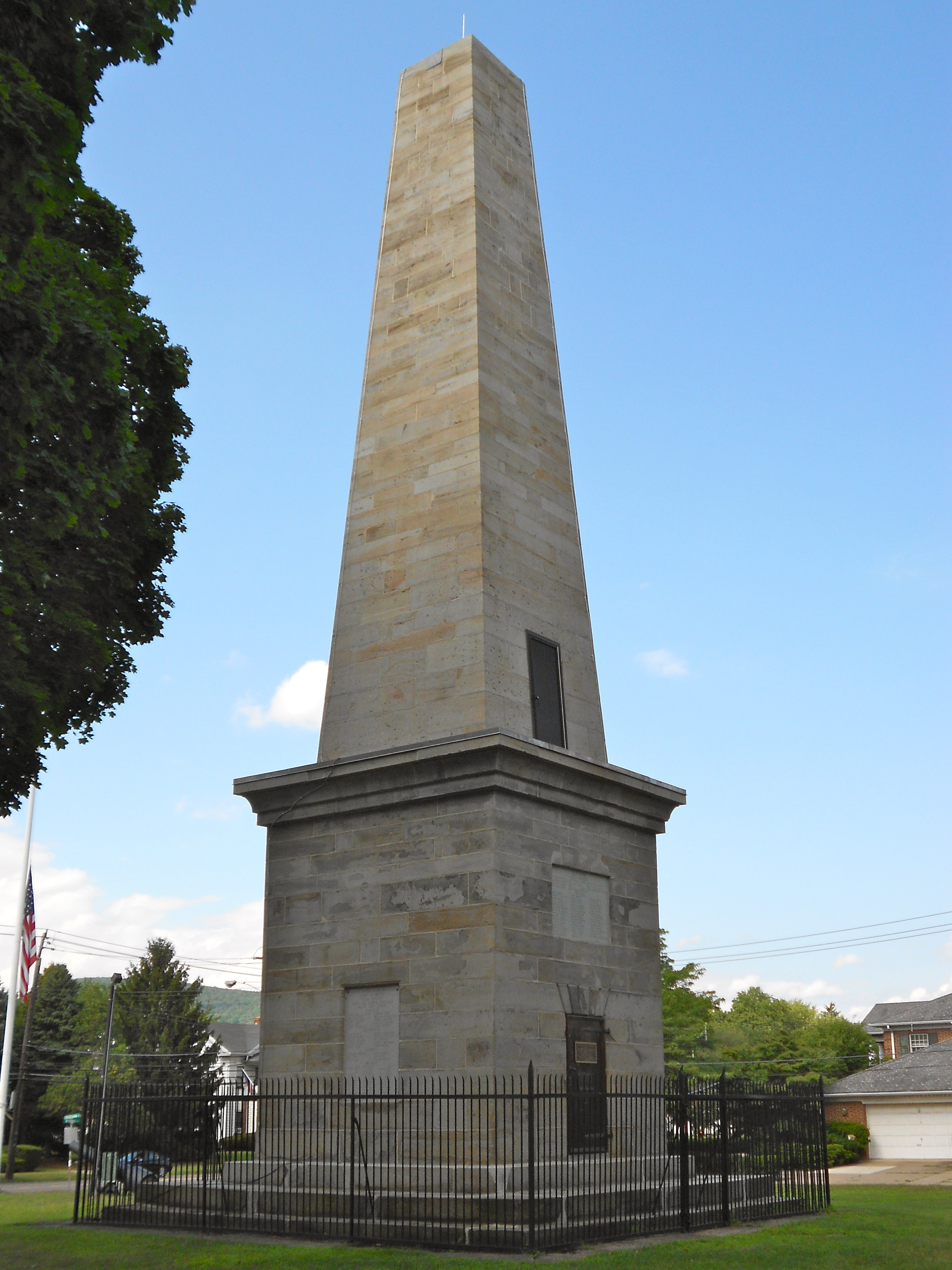
- Wyoming Monument, burial site for Battle of Wyoming casualties

- Location of Wyoming in Luzerne County, Pennsylvania

- Location within Pennsylvania Location within the United States
- Coordinates: 41°18′34″N 75°50′13″W
- Country: United States
- State: Pennsylvania
- County: Luzerne
- Region: Greater Pittston
- Settled: 18th century
- Incorporated: 1885

Government
  - Body: Borough Council
  - Mayor: Joseph Dominick (R)

Area
  - Total: 1.56 sq mi (4.03 km^{2})
  - Land: 1.42 sq mi (3.69 km^{2})
  - Water: 0.13 sq mi (0.34 km^{2})

Population (2020)
  - Total: 3,097 ▲
  - Estimate (2021): 3,103
  - Density: 2,111.8/sq mi (815.36/km^{2})
- Time zone: UTC-5 (Eastern (EST))
  - Summer (DST): UTC-4 (EDT)
- Zip code: 18644
- Area code: 570
- FIPS code: 42-86856
- Website: wyomingpa.org

Wyoming is a borough in the Greater Pittston area of Luzerne County, Pennsylvania, United States. It is located 5 miles (8 km) north of Wilkes-Barre, along the Susquehanna River. The population was 3,097 as of the 2020 census.

== Etymology ==
The name "Wyoming" derives from the Munsee word xwé:wamənk, meaning "at the big river flat". The state of Wyoming is either named after this borough or the surrounding valley.

== History ==
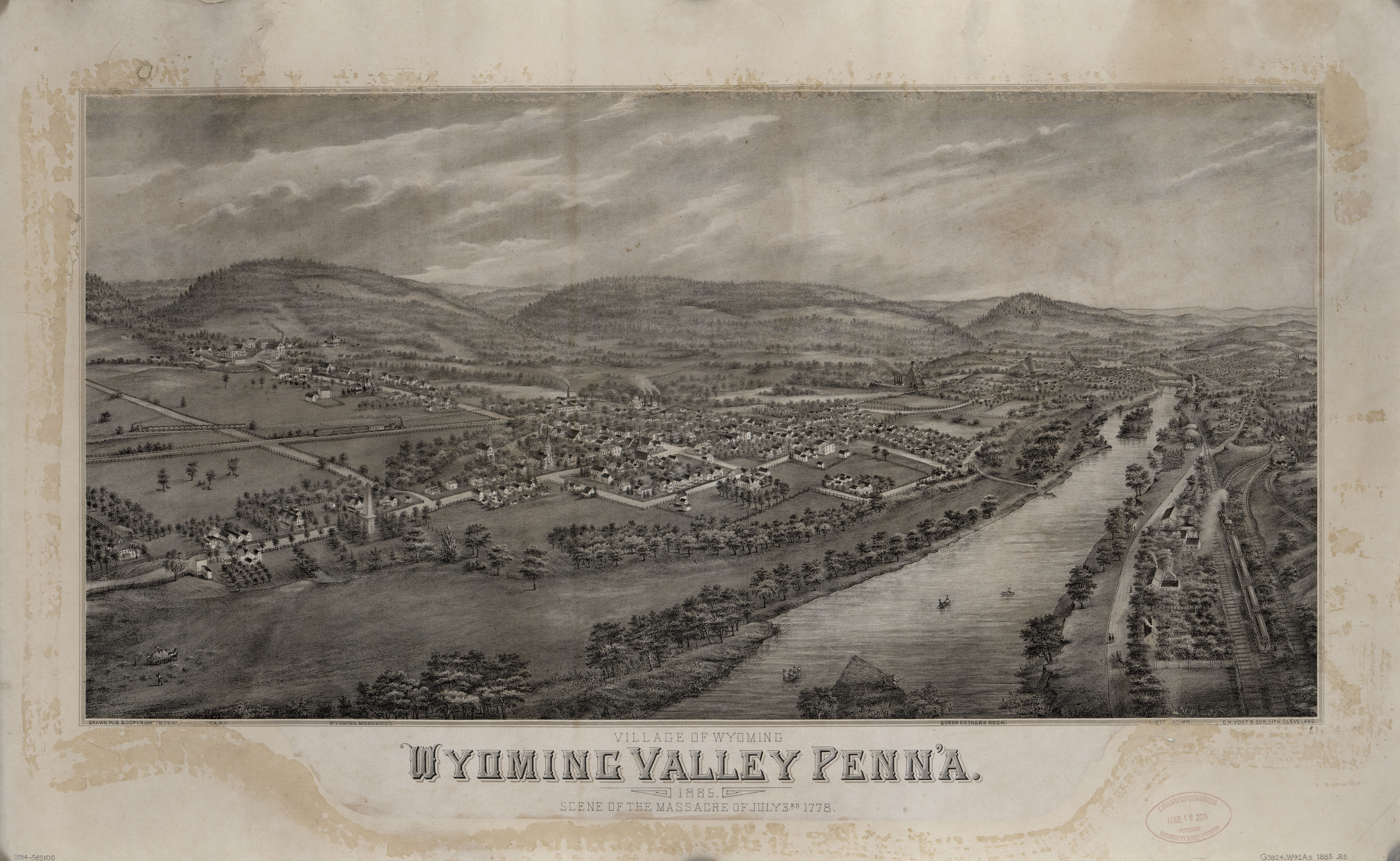
Village of Wyoming

=== Early history ===
By the 1700s, the Wyoming Valley was inhabited by several Native American tribes (including the Susquehannock and the Delaware). In the mid-18th century, Connecticut settlers ventured into the valley. These were the first recorded Europeans in the region. In 1768, the Susquehanna Company of Connecticut devised a plan to divide the Wyoming Valley into five townships. Each township was to be divided amongst forty settlers. Wyoming was originally part of Kingston Township.

=== Battle of Wyoming ===
On June 30, 1778, Loyalist forces, under the command of Major John Butler, arrived in the Wyoming Valley to attack the American settlements. On July 1, Fort Wintermoot at the north end of the valley surrendered without a shot being fired. The next morning the smaller Fort Jenkins surrendered. Both forts were later burned to the ground.

Meanwhile the Patriot militia assembled at Forty Fort. On July 3, a column of roughly 375 men including a company of soldiers in the Continental Army marched from the fort under the command of Lieutenant Colonel Zebulon Butler and Colonel Nathan Denison. Major Butler's Rangers, with the assistance of about 500 Native American allies, ambushed the oncoming Americans. In the end, nearly 300 Patriot soldiers from the Wyoming Valley were killed during the Battle of Wyoming, commonly known as the Wyoming Massacre.

The next day Colonel Denison surrendered Forty Fort along with several other posts. Widespread looting and burning of buildings occurred throughout the Wyoming Valley subsequent to the capitulation, but non-combatants were not harmed. Most of the inhabitants, however, fled across the Pocono Mountains to Stroudsburg and Easton or down the Susquehanna River to Sunbury.

=== Wyoming Monument ===
Today, in the Borough of Wyoming, a monument constructed in the early 1830s marks the gravesite of the casualties of the battle. An annual observance, sponsored by the Wyoming Commemorative Association, takes place at the obelisk grounds to honor the fallen heroes of this Revolutionary War battle. The monument has also been listed on the National Register of Historic Places.

Along with the Wyoming Monument, the Luzerne Presbyterial Institute and Swetland Homestead are also listed on the National Register of Historic Places.

=== Borough of Wyoming ===
Wyoming was officially incorporated as a borough in 1885. The Eighth Street Bridge was constructed over the Susquehanna River during the early 20th century; it connected the Borough of Wyoming to Jenkins Township. In 2011, it was demolished and replaced with a new bridge.

The flood of 2011 prompted the evacuation of the Wilkes-Barre Wyoming Valley Airport (in southern Wyoming). The planes were moved to a higher elevation to prevent flood damage; they were relocated to the Wyoming Monument.

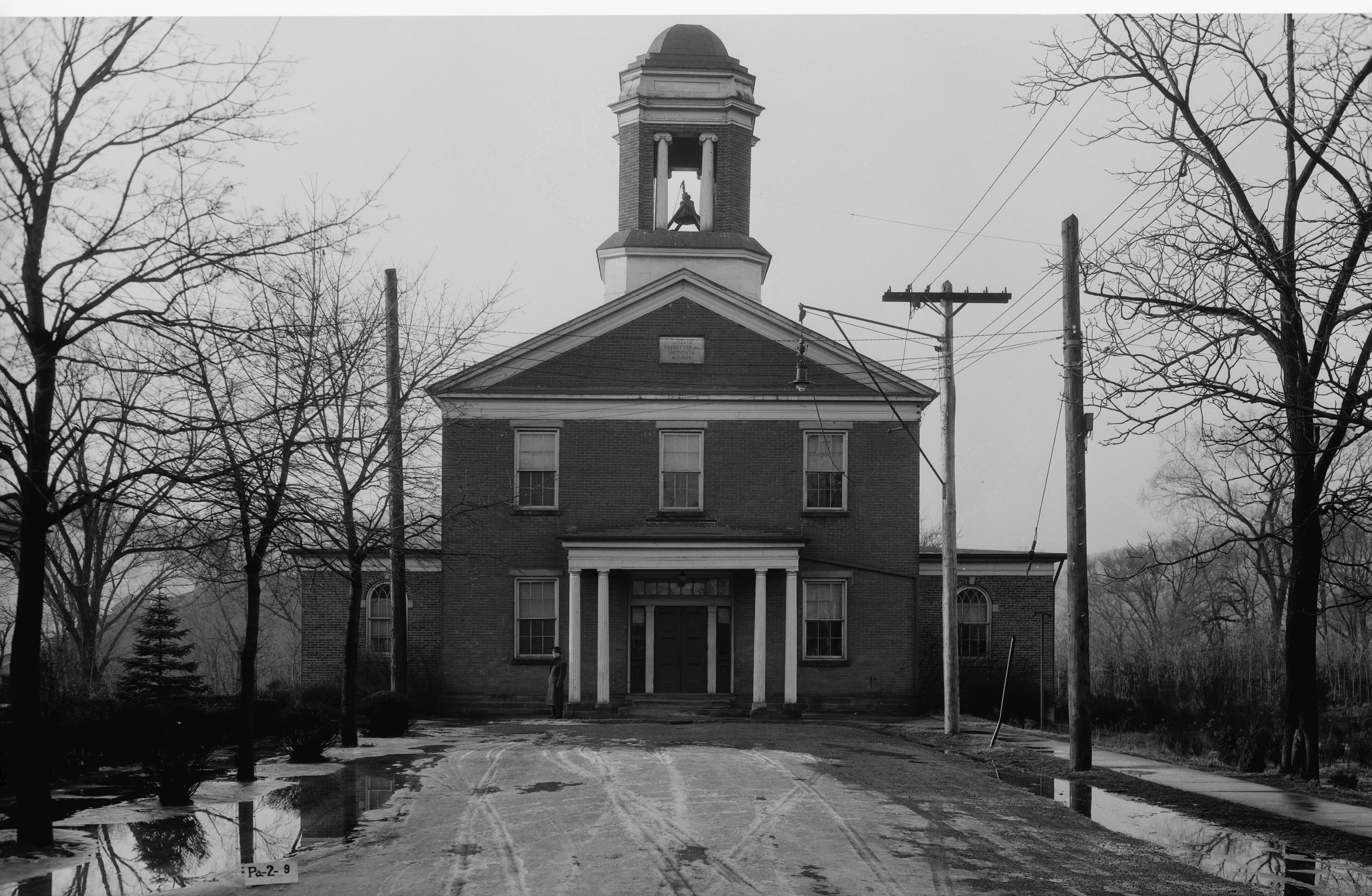
Luzerne Presbyterial Institute

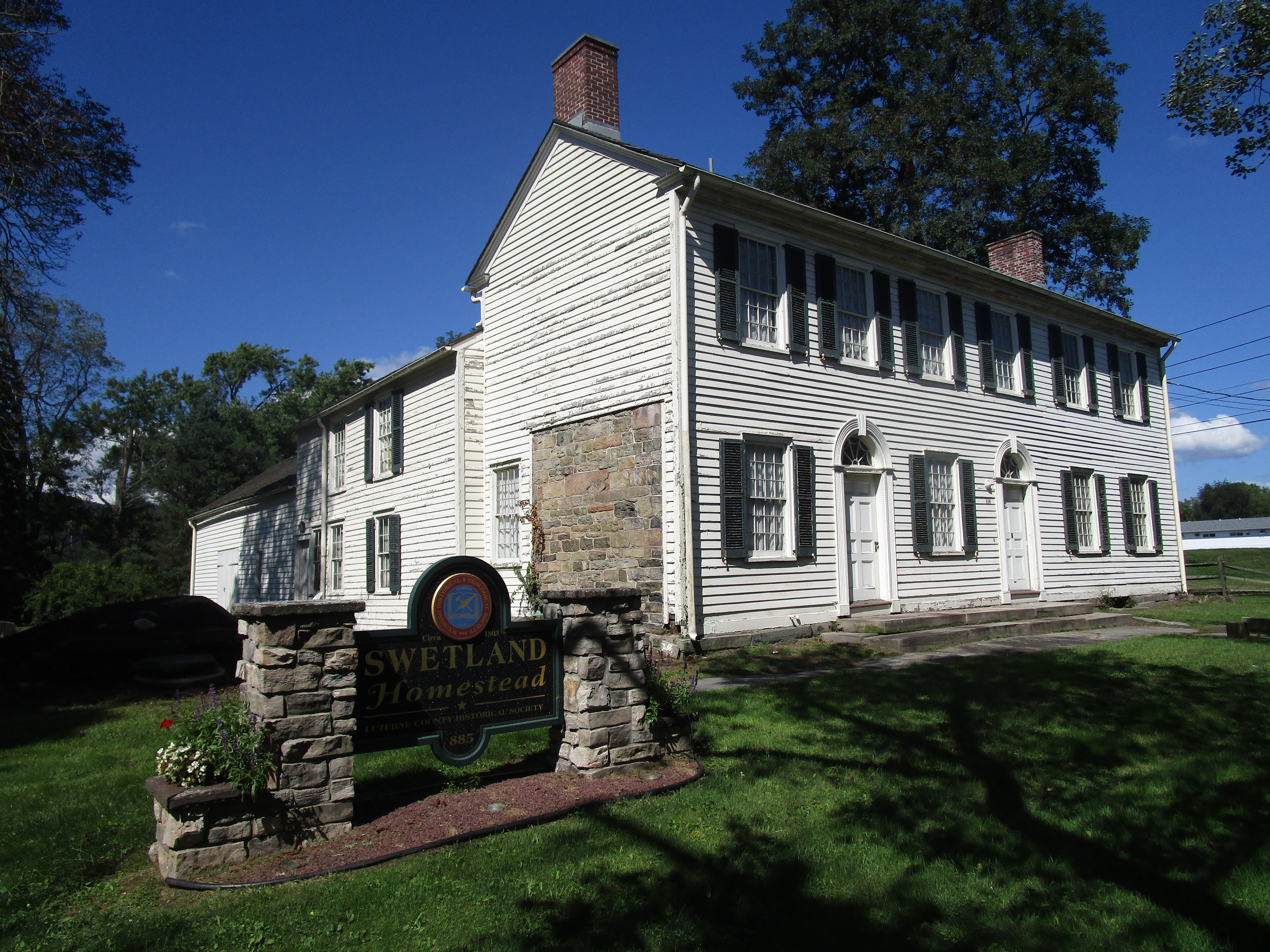
Swetland Homestead

== Geography ==
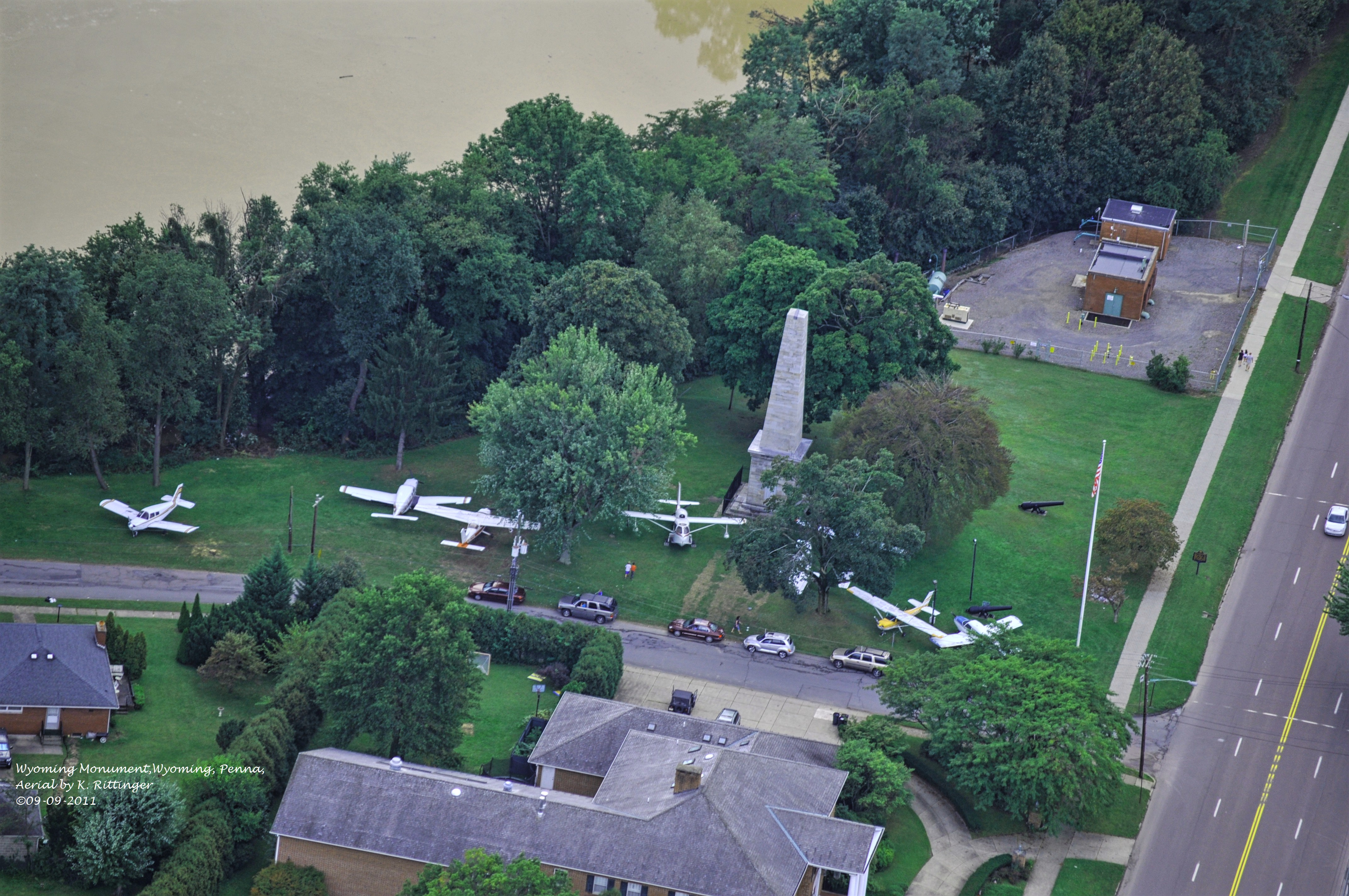
An aerial view of the Wyoming Monument, Susquehanna River, and U.S. Route 11. During the flood of 2011, planes from the nearby airport were moved to higher ground.

Wyoming is located at 41°18′34″N 75°50′13″W (41.309346, -75.836849). According to the United States Census Bureau, the borough has a total area of 1.6 square miles (4.1 km^{2}), of which 1.4 square miles (3.7 km^{2}) is land and 0.15 square miles (0.4 km^{2}), or 9.26%, is water.

The Borough of Wyoming is a small strip of land on the western bank of the Susquehanna River. The area closest to the river is mostly made up of trees and fertile farmland. Homes and businesses are located further inland. Eighth Street and Wyoming Avenue (U.S. Route 11) run through the heart of the borough. They intersect in the northern half of the community. Many businesses are located along US 11. The Eighth Street Bridge links Wyoming to Jenkins Township, which is on the opposite bank of the Susquehanna River.

A section of the Wilkes-Barre Wyoming Valley Airport is located in southern Wyoming. The airport covers 135 acres (55 ha) at an elevation of 543 feet (166 m). In 2011, the airport had 25,125 aircraft operations (an average of 68 per day). 99.5% was general aviation, while 0.3% was military and 0.2% was air taxi. 51 aircraft were then based at the airport (this consisted of 98% single-engine and 2% multi-engine).

The following communities neighbor Wyoming: West Wyoming Borough (northwest), Exeter Borough (northeast), Jenkins Township (east, southeast), Plains Township (south), and Forty Fort Borough (southwest).

== Demographics ==
Historical population
Census	Pop.	Note	%±
1880	1,147		—
1890	1,794		56.4%
1900	1,909		6.4%
1910	3,010		57.7%
1920	3,582		19.0%
1930	4,648		29.8%
1940	4,728		1.7%
1950	4,511		−4.6%
1960	4,127		−8.5%
1970	4,195		1.6%
1980	3,655		−12.9%
1990	3,255		−10.9%
2000	3,221		−1.0%
2010	3,073		−4.6%
2020	3,102		0.9%
2021 (est.)	3,103	▲	0.0%

=== 2020 census ===
As of the 2020 census, Wyoming had a population of 3,102. The median age was 45.7 years. 17.9% of residents were under the age of 18 and 23.9% of residents were 65 years of age or older. For every 100 females there were 90.5 males, and for every 100 females age 18 and over there were 86.0 males age 18 and over.

100.0% of residents lived in urban areas, while 0.0% lived in rural areas.

There were 1,435 households in Wyoming, of which 21.8% had children under the age of 18 living in them. Of all households, 36.4% were married-couple households, 21.5% were households with a male householder and no spouse or partner present, and 33.2% were households with a female householder and no spouse or partner present. About 39.5% of all households were made up of individuals and 19.9% had someone living alone who was 65 years of age or older.

There were 1,571 housing units, of which 8.7% were vacant. The homeowner vacancy rate was 1.3% and the rental vacancy rate was 3.0%.

Racial composition as of the 2020 census
Race	Number	Percent
White	2,843	91.7%
Black or African American	80	2.6%
American Indian and Alaska Native	11	0.4%
Asian	19	0.6%
Native Hawaiian and Other Pacific Islander	2	0.1%
Some other race	32	1.0%
Two or more races	115	3.7%
Hispanic or Latino (of any race)	106	3.4%

=== 2000 census ===
As of the census of 2000, there were 3,221 people, 1,487 households, and 852 families residing in the borough. The population density was 2,271.6 inhabitants per square mile (877.1/km^{2}). There were 1,580 housing units at an average density of 1,114.3 per square mile (430.2/km^{2}). The racial makeup of the borough was 99.50% White, 0.06% African American, 0.06% Asian, 0.03% Pacific Islander, 0.16% from other races, and 0.19% from two or more races. Hispanic or Latino of any race were 0.28% of the population.

There were 1,487 households, out of which 21.5% had children under the age of 18 living with them, 43.6% were married couples living together, 10.1% had a female householder with no husband present, and 42.7% were non-families. 38.5% of all households were made up of individuals, and 21.6% had someone living alone who was 65 years of age or older. The average household size was 2.13 and the average family size was 2.87.

In the borough the population was spread out, with 19.2% under the age of 18, 5.7% from 18 to 24, 27.9% from 25 to 44, 21.5% from 45 to 64, and 25.6% who were 65 years of age or older. The median age was 43 years. For every 100 females, there were 82.8 males. For every 100 females age 18 and over, there were 78.9 males.

The median income for a household in the borough was $33,576, and the median income for a family was $44,087. Males had a median income of $33,015 versus $24,718 for females. The per capita income for the borough was $18,428. About 5.7% of families and 9.9% of the population were below the poverty line, including 14.9% of those under age 18 and 9.3% of those age 65 or over.

== Education ==
It is in the Wyoming Area School District.
