= Keller House (Hazleton, Pennsylvania) =

Historic house in Pennsylvania, United States

- Formerly listed on the U.S. National Register of Historic Places
- Location: 217 West Broad Street, Hazleton, Pennsylvania
- Area: 0.3 acres (0.12 ha)
- Built: 1854
- Architect: Ario Pardee, Will Michler
- NRHP reference No.: 76001647

Significant dates
- Added to NRHP: November 13, 1976
- Removed from NRHP: December 18, 1978

The Keller House in Hazleton, Pennsylvania was a historic house that was listed on the National Register of Historic Places. It was removed from the National Register in 1978. It was acquired by the Pennsylvania Historical and Museum Commission in 1978 after a $60,000 grant from the United States Department of the Interior.

== See also ==
- National Register of Historic Places listings in Luzerne County, Pennsylvania
