= Weiss Hall =

- U.S. National Register of Historic Places
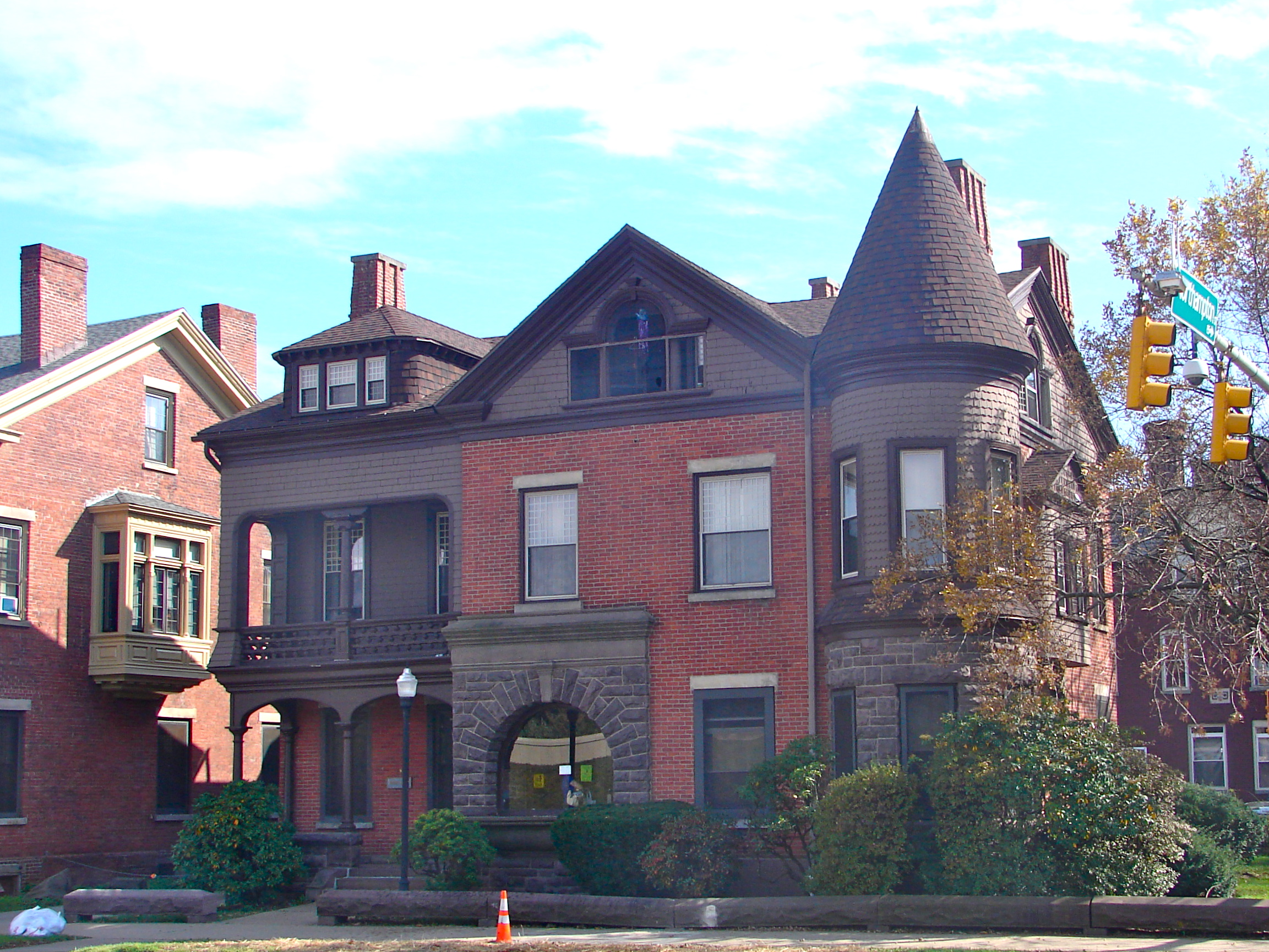
- Weiss Hall, October 2011

- Location within Pennsylvania Location within the United States
- Location: 98 S. River St., Wilkes-Barre, Pennsylvania
- Coordinates: 41°14′47″N 75°53′12″W
- Area: less than one acre
- Built: c. 1895
- Architectural style: Greek Revival, Queen Anne, Romanesque
- NRHP reference No.: 72001134
- Added to NRHP: November 27, 1972

Weiss Hall, also known as the Judge Edmund Taylor House, is an historic dormitory that is located on the campus of Wilkes University at Wilkes-Barre, Luzerne County, Pennsylvania, United States.

It was added to the National Register of Historic Places in 1972.

== History and architectural features ==
Built circa 1895, this historic structure is a two-and-one-half-story, stone, brick, and shingled building that was designed in the Queen Anne style. It features a tower, a recessed third floor balcony, steep gables, a large side porch, and stained glass windows. It was built as a residence and later acquired by Wilkes College and used as a residence hall.
