= Catlin Hall =

- Catlin Hall, Wilkes College
- U.S. National Register of Historic Places
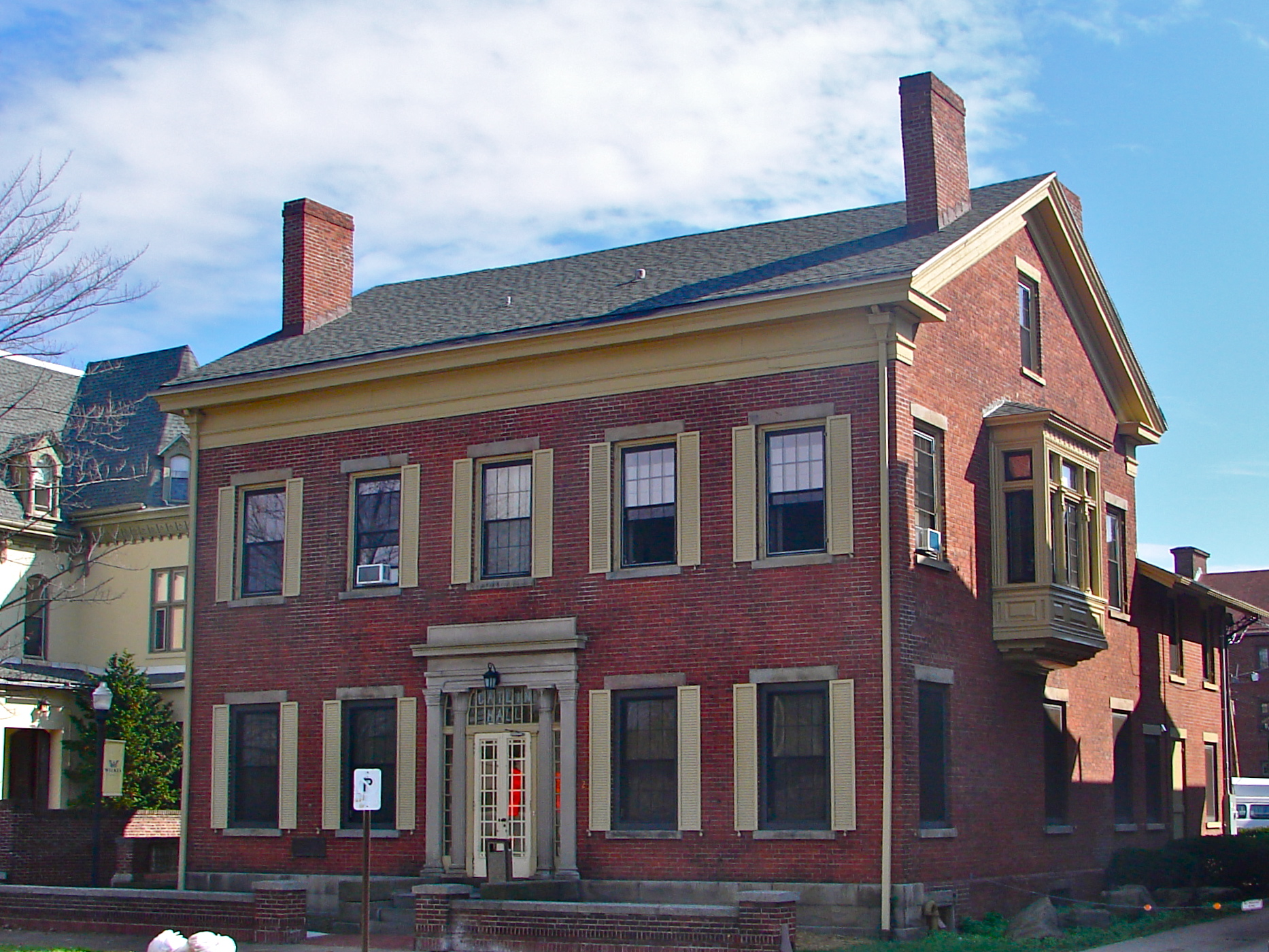
- Catlin Hall, October 2011

- Location within Pennsylvania Location within the United States
- Location: 92 S. River St., Wilkes-Barre, Pennsylvania
- Coordinates: 41°14′47″N 75°53′12″W
- Area: less than one acre
- Built: 1843
- Architect: Elizah Reynolds
- Architectural style: Greek Revival
- NRHP reference No.: 72001132
- Added to NRHP: March 16, 1972

Catlin Hall, also known as George Catlin Hall and Reynolds House, is a historic dormitory located on the campus of Wilkes University at Wilkes-Barre, Luzerne County, Pennsylvania. It was built in 1843, and is a 2 1/2-story, rectangular brick building in the Greek Revival style. It has a two-story rear wing. It was built as the Reynolds family residence and used as such into the 1950s, after which it was sold to Wilkes College in 1957. It was used as the women's residence hall and named for Wilkes-Barre native, painter George Catlin.

It was added to the National Register of Historic Places in 1972.
