= Wyoming Commemorative Association =

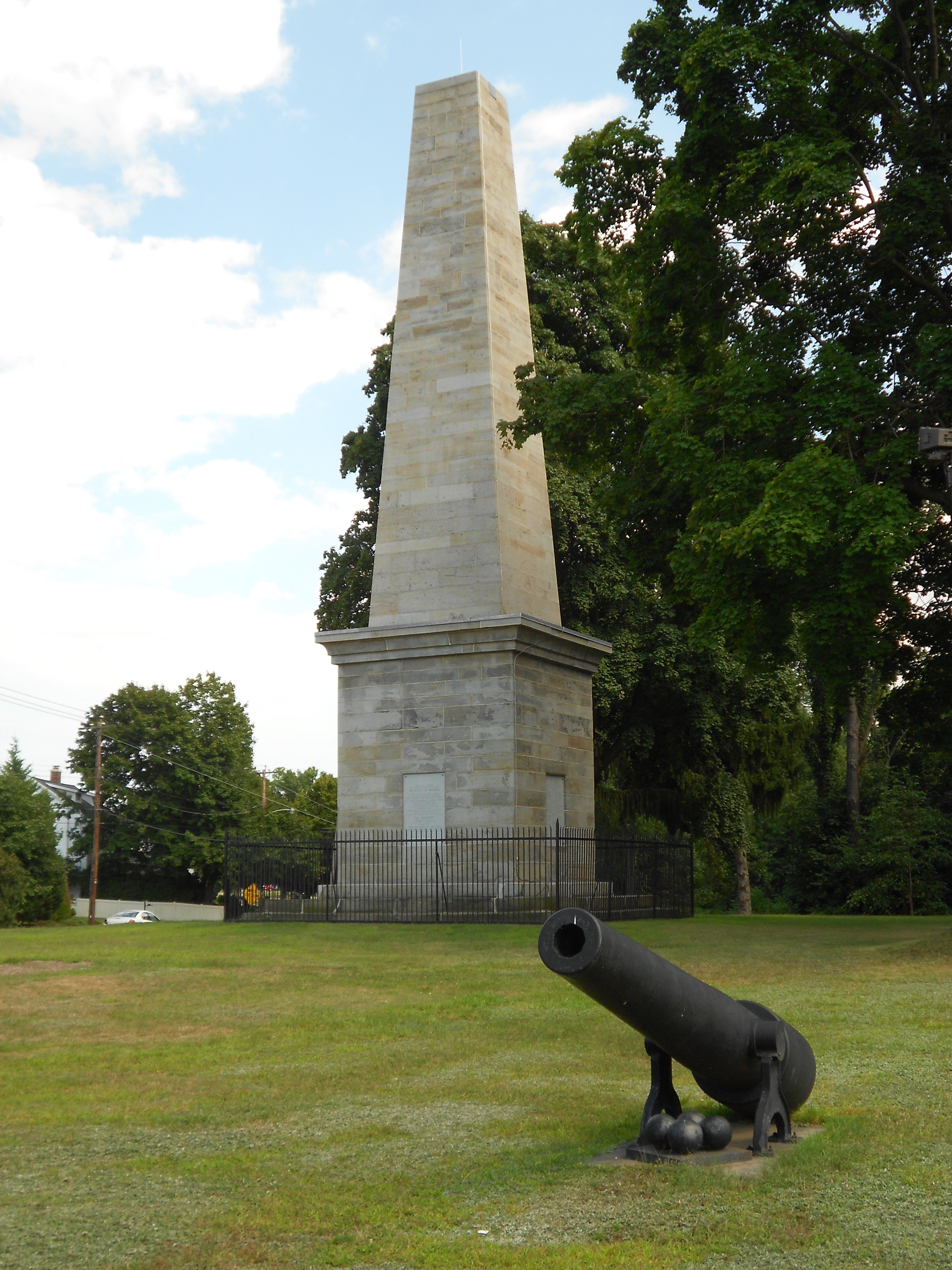
Wyoming Monument in 2013

Wyoming Commemorative Association was founded in 1878 to commemorate the 100th anniversary of the Battle of Wyoming (also known as the Wyoming Valley Massacre). This American Revolutionary War battle was fought on July 3, 1778, near Wilkes-Barre in present-day Exeter, Pennsylvania.

== History ==
The Association was informally organized in 1877 to prepare for the centennial anniversary of the battle. Organizers of the events gathered on January 1, 1878 on the recently excavated foundation of the original fort at Forty Fort, the site from where the American defenders had departed on the day of the fateful battle in 1778. In 1928, the sesquicentennial of the battle was elaborately celebrated both at the monument as well as throughout the community.

The Association's first observance was held on July 3, 1878, drawing a crowd of more than 50,000 people to hear the main speaker for the event, U. S. President Rutherford B. Hayes. During the three-day visit, President Hayes was accompanied by the U.S. Secretary of the Treasury John Sherman, as well as the U.S. Attorney General Charles Devens. Over a quarter of a century later, President Theodore Roosevelt visited the Wyoming Monument during a tour of Wyoming Valley in 1905. On May 28, 2013, former President Jimmy Carter gave a speech at the Monument.

=== 19th Century speakers ===
Each year since 1878, the Wyoming Commemorative Association has hosted a major observance on the grounds of the Wyoming Monument to pay tribute to the famed battle. Hereditary and military organizations place floral tributes at the foot of the monument and the 24th Connecticut Militia (Revolutionary War reenactors) present a volley tribute. Many members of the Association represent some of the leading families of the greater Wilkes-Barre area as well as descendants of those who fought in the battle. Frank E.P. Conyngham has served as president of the association since 1990.

A number of prominent speakers have addressed the annual program, including Rev. Thomas K. Beecher, D.D., brother of famed writer and abolitionist Harriet Beecher Stowe in 1895; Pennsylvania historian Sydney G. Fisher in 1896; Francis W. Halsey of the New York Times in 1898 and Dr. John Howard Harris President of Bucknell University in 1899.

=== 20th Century speakers ===
In 1901, Dr. E. D. Warfield, President of Lafayette College; Dr. William Elliot Griffis in 1903; History Professor Dr. Albert Bushnell Hart of Harvard University in 1906; Hon. Simeon E. Baldwin in 1907; Pulitzer Prize winner Claude Halstead Van Tyne of the University of Michigan in 1909; Hon. John E. Potter in 1916; Pennsylvania State Librarian and Director of the State Museum of Pennsylvania Frederic A. Godcharles in 1923; Willis Fletcher Johnson diplomatic writer for the New York Tribune in 1925; University of Pennsylvania dean William E. Lingelbach in 1930; Arthur C. Parker in 1931; Alexander Flick, professor at Syracuse University and then New York State historian in 1933; historian and Union College President Dixon Ryan Fox in 1934; historian, Princeton University librarian and editor of the Susquehannah Company Papers Julian P. Boyd in 1936; Pulitzer Prize winning author Roy Franklin Nichols in 1937; Pulitzer Prize winner Lawrence Henry Gipson in 1941; former Pennsylvania governor Arthur James in 1947; Lafayette College President Ralph Cooper Hutchison in 1951; Julian P. Boyd, editor of the Papers of Thomas Jefferson in 1958; Pennsylvania Supreme Court Justice Benjamin R. Jones in 1959; Congressman Francis Walter in 1960; Hon. William Scranton in 1961; Wilkes University President Eugene Farley in 1963; U.S. Senator Hugh Scott in 1969; Congressman Daniel J. Flood in 1973; Major General Joseph Perugino of the 28th Infantry of the Pennsylvania National Guard in 1995; and Dr. Michael MacDowell, President of Misericordia University in 1999.

=== 21st Century speakers ===
Theodore Roosevelt's great-grandson Tweed Roosevelt, spoke at the Association's 2005 observance, which celebrated Roosevelt's visit to the Monument in 1905. The principal speaker at the 2010 observance was Denise Dennis, author and collateral descendant of Revolutionary War soldier Gershom Prince, an African American patriot who was killed during the Battle of Wyoming. On July 4, 2011, the Association held their annual observance, which included a rededication of the Wyoming Monument following its extensive restoration. In 2012, the keynote speaker for the observance was Dr. William V. Lewis, Jr., Commissioner of the Pennsylvania Historical and Museum Commission. In 2013, the commemoration speaker was Professor John Frantz, Professor Emeritus of American History at The Pennsylvania State University In May 2013, at a privately sponsored event at the Monument, former U. S. President Jimmy Carter gave an address on the Monument grounds.

The Association publishes an annual Proceedings, which is widely distributed both to its membership and to historic research libraries.
