= Swetland Homestead =

Historic house in Pennsylvania, United States

- U.S. National Register of Historic Places
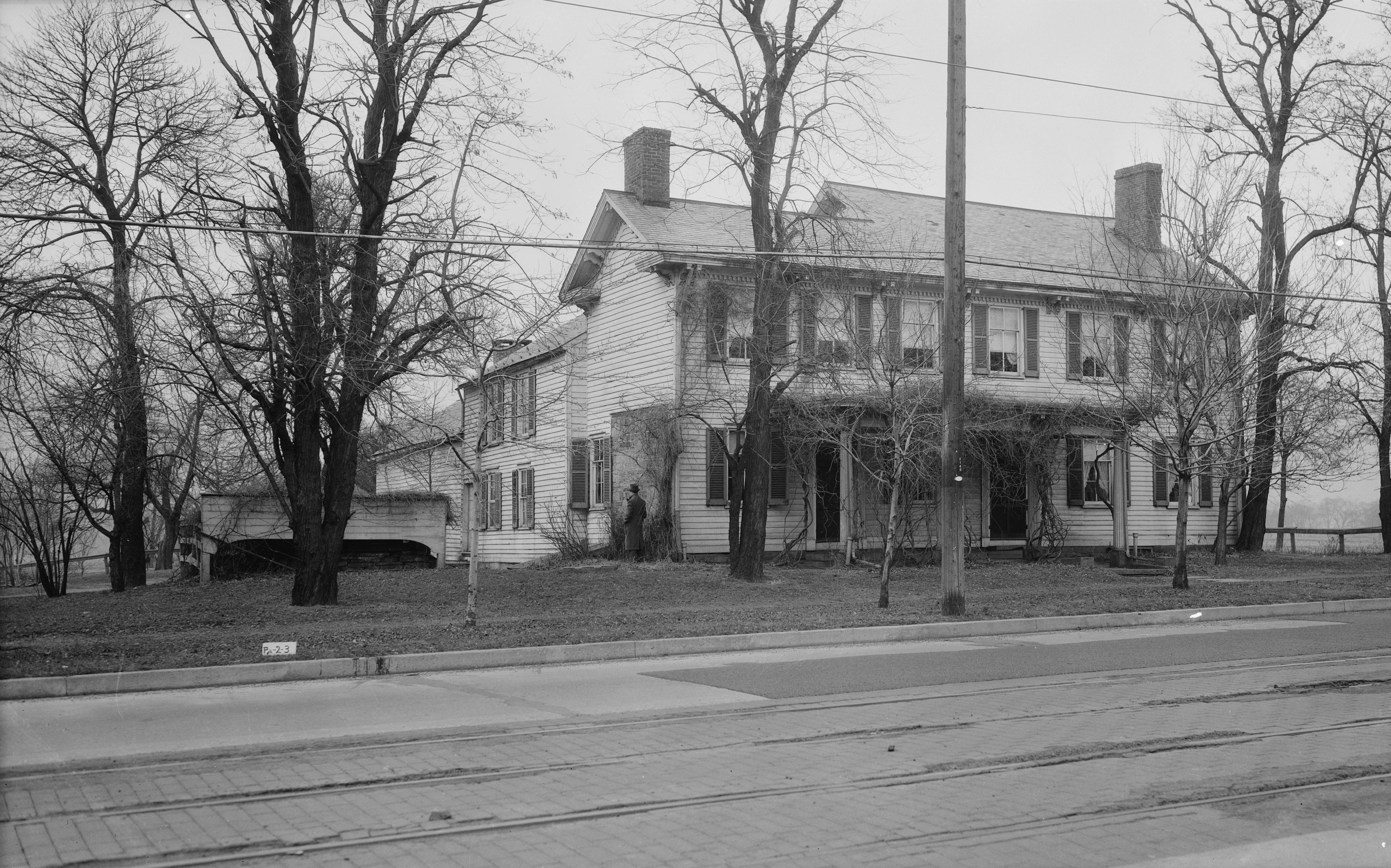
- Swetland Homestead, HABS photo, December 1934

- Location within Pennsylvania Location within the United States
- Interactive map showing the location of Swetland Homestead
- Location: 885 Wyoming Ave., Wyoming, Pennsylvania
- Coordinates: 41°18′6″N 75°51′10″W
- Area: 1.5 acres (0.61 ha)
- Built: 1797, 1803, 1809, 1813, 1850
- NRHP reference No.: 78002427
- Added to NRHP: December 13, 1978

The Swetland Homestead is an historic home that is located in Wyoming, Luzerne County, Pennsylvania, United States.

It was added to the National Register of Historic Places in 1978.

== History and architectural features ==
The original section of this historic residence was built in 1797; it was subsequently expanded between 1803 and 1813. It is a 2 1/2-story, L-shaped frame structure measuring 54 feet 3 inches (16.54 m) by 88 feet 4 inches (26.92 m). A four-columned portico was added in 1850.

The Swetland Homestead is now a historic house museum that is open by appointment with the Luzerne County Historical Society.
