= George W. Guthrie School =

- U.S. National Register of Historic Places
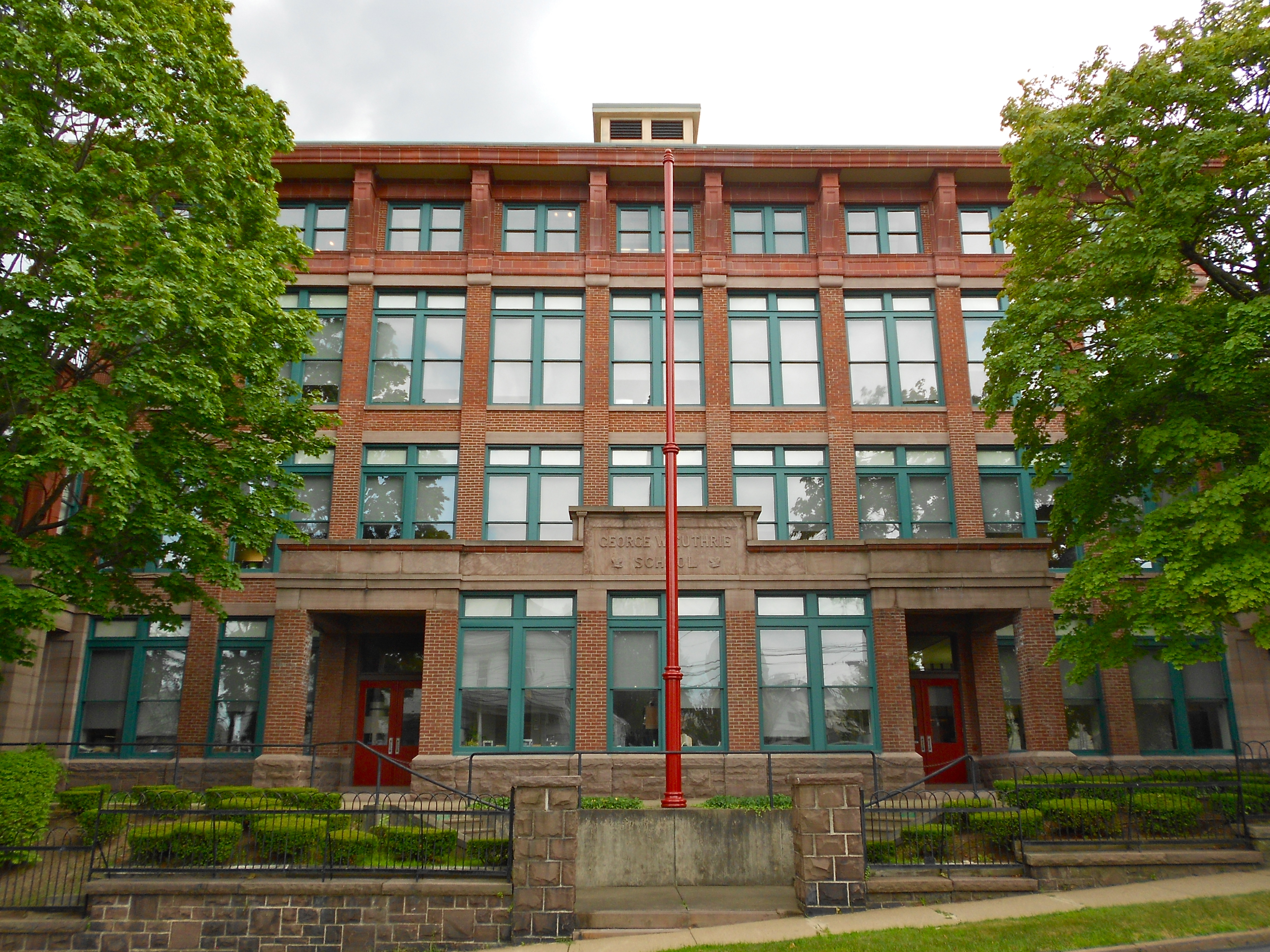
- The school, converted to a corporate HQ, in 2013

- Location within Pennsylvania Location within the United States
- Location: 643 N. Washington St., Wilkes-Barre, Pennsylvania
- Coordinates: 41°15′22″N 75°51′45″W
- Area: 1.8 acres (0.73 ha)
- Built: 1914-1915
- Architect: Ireland, Robert
- NRHP reference No.: 80003565
- Added to NRHP: June 27, 1980

The George W. Guthrie School is an historic high school building which is located in Wilkes-Barre, Luzerne County, Pennsylvania.

It was added to the National Register of Historic Places in 1980.

== History and architectural features ==
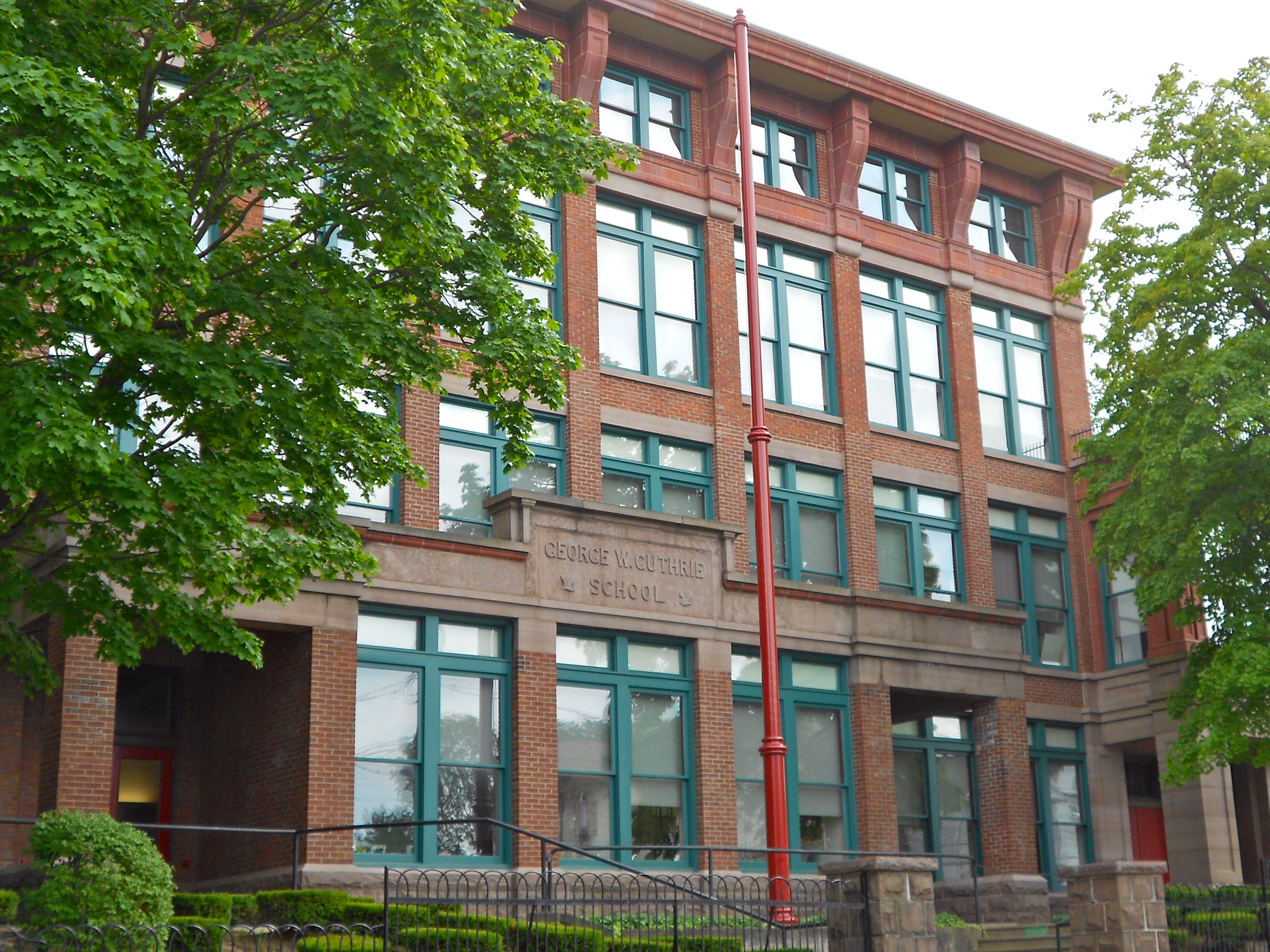
View through the trees

Built between 1914 and 1915, the George W. Guthrie School is a four-story, steel frame and reinforced concrete building faced with brick, with stone and terra cotta trim. It measures 136 feet wide and 109 feet deep. The school was named for George W. Guthrie, who served as the superintendent of the Wilkes-Barre schools until 1913.
