= Wyoming Monument =

- U.S. National Register of Historic Places
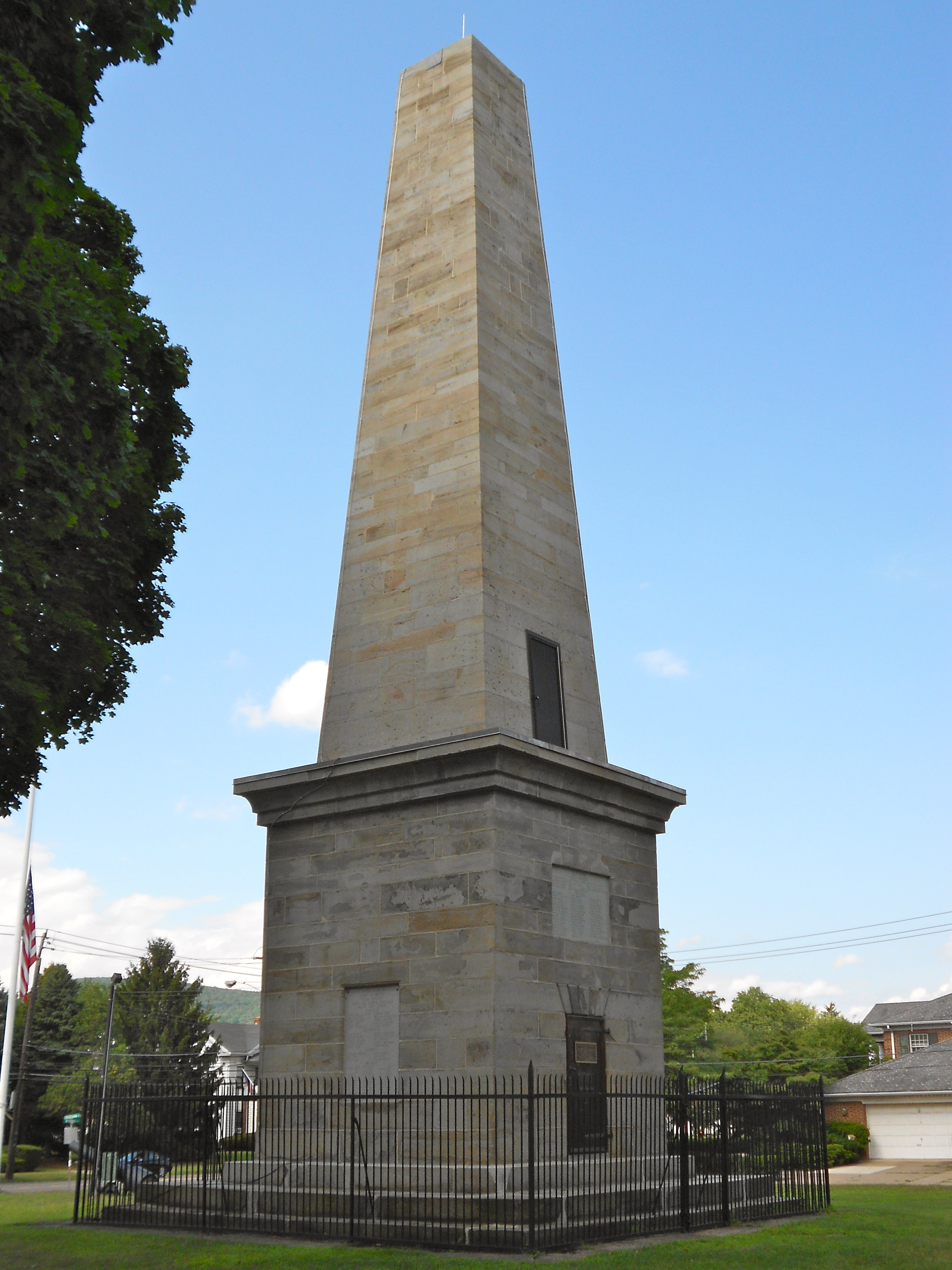
- Wyoming Monument in 2013

- Location within Pennsylvania Location within the United States
- Location: US 11, Wyoming Ave. and Susquehanna Ave., Wyoming, Pennsylvania
- Coordinates: 41°18′19.6″N 75°50′41.1″W
- Area: less than one acre
- Built: 1833
- Architect: Walter, Thomas Ustick; et al.
- Architectural style: Exotic Revival
- NRHP reference No.: 02000509
- Added to NRHP: May 13, 2002

The Wyoming Monument is an American Revolutionary War monument and grave site located in the Borough of Wyoming in Luzerne County, Pennsylvania.

It was listed on the National Register of Historic Places in 2002.

== History ==
=== Background ===
The monument marks the location of the bones of victims from the Battle of Wyoming (also known as the Wyoming Massacre), which took place on July 3, 1778. Local Patriots banded together to defend the area against a raid by Loyalist and indigenous forces. The engagement ended in defeat for the Patriots, and considerable brutality followed the battle. It was not until October 1778 that the commanding officer of Fort Wyoming (Wilkes-Barre) felt the area safe enough to return and begin recovery of the bodies.

=== Memorial ===
The remains were gathered and interred in a common grave, only to be exhumed at public ceremonies in 1832 — ceremonies attended by some of the then elderly survivors of the battle. In 1833, the bones were re-interred in a vault under the present monument.

Each year, beginning in 1878 for the 100th anniversary of the battle, a commemorative ceremony is held on the grounds of the monument. The ceremony is sponsored by the Wyoming Commemorative Association. Ownership of the monument is held by the Wyoming Monument Association, originally formed as the Ladies Monumental Association.

On August 2, 2008, the monument was struck by lightning, causing some damage and putting the monument in need of repairs. In 2010, the restoration began and the monument, completely repaired and restored, was rededicated at the annual celebration of the Wyoming Commemorative Association in 2011.

== Gallery ==
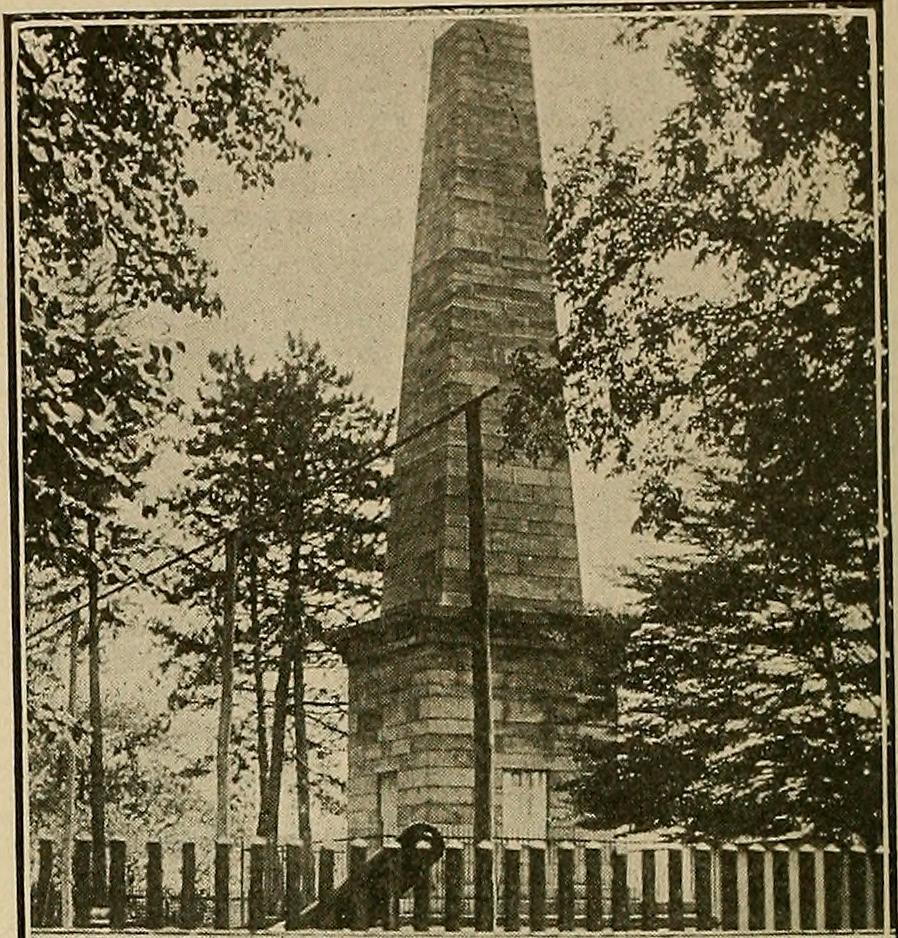
Photo of the Monument circa 1910

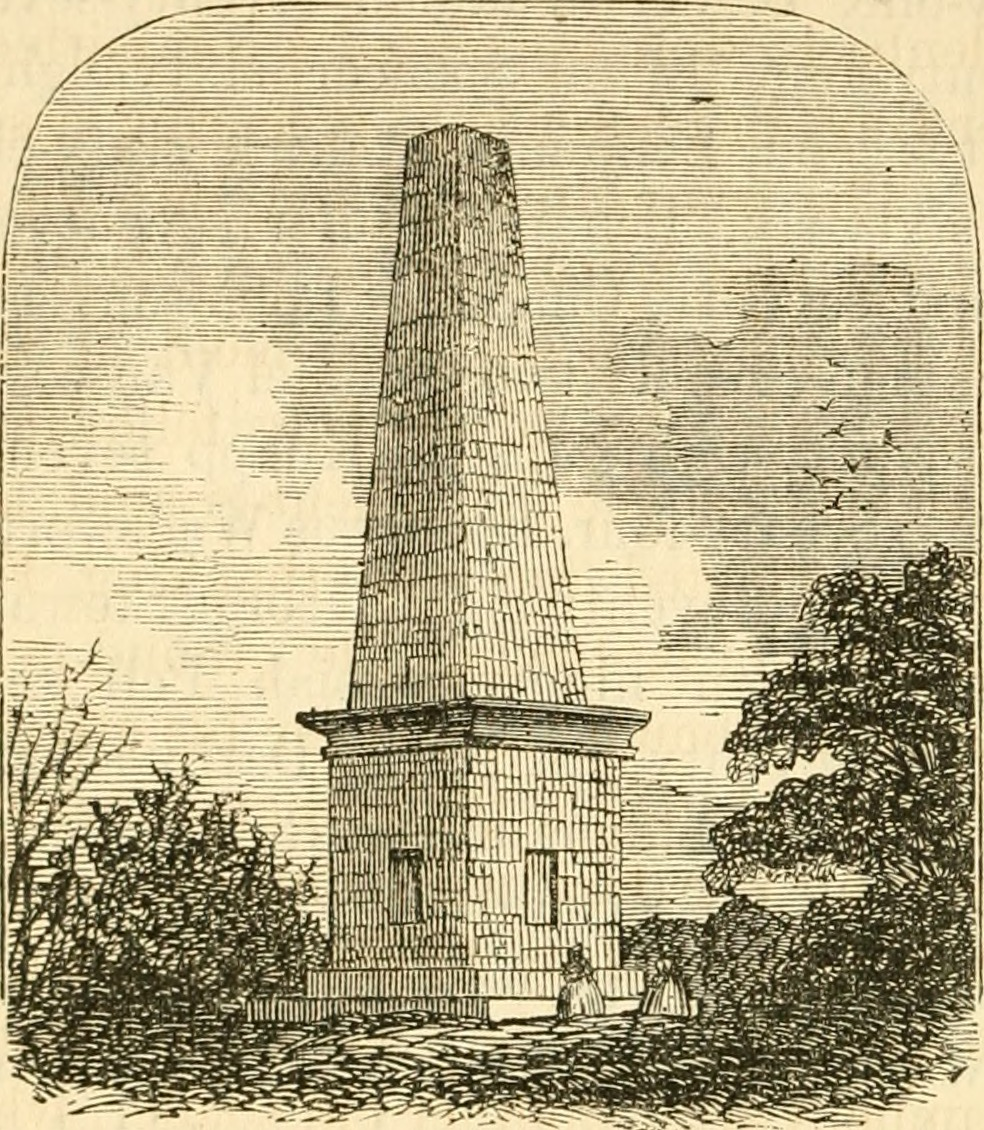
Sketch of the Wyoming Monument circa 1860

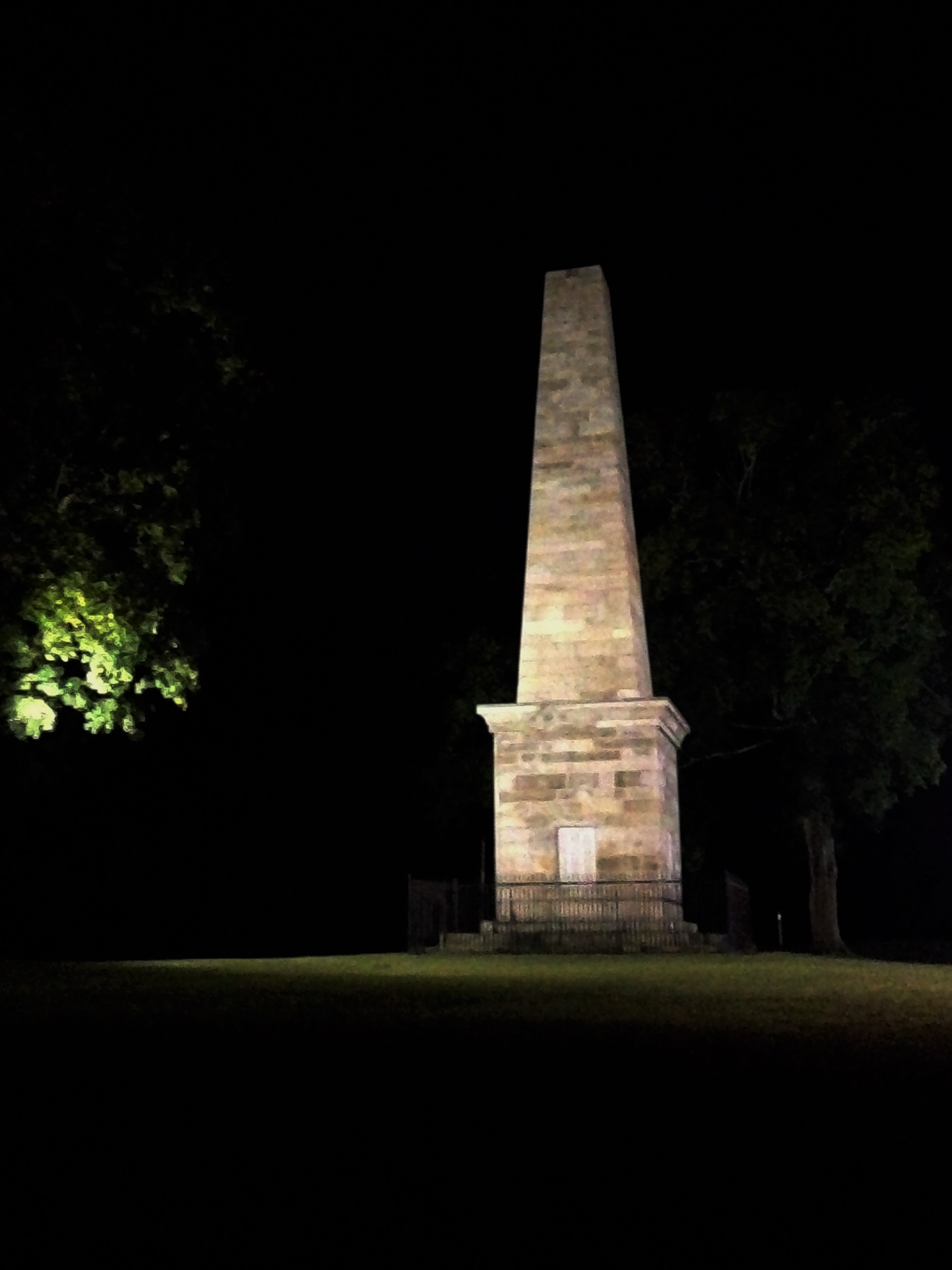
The monument at night

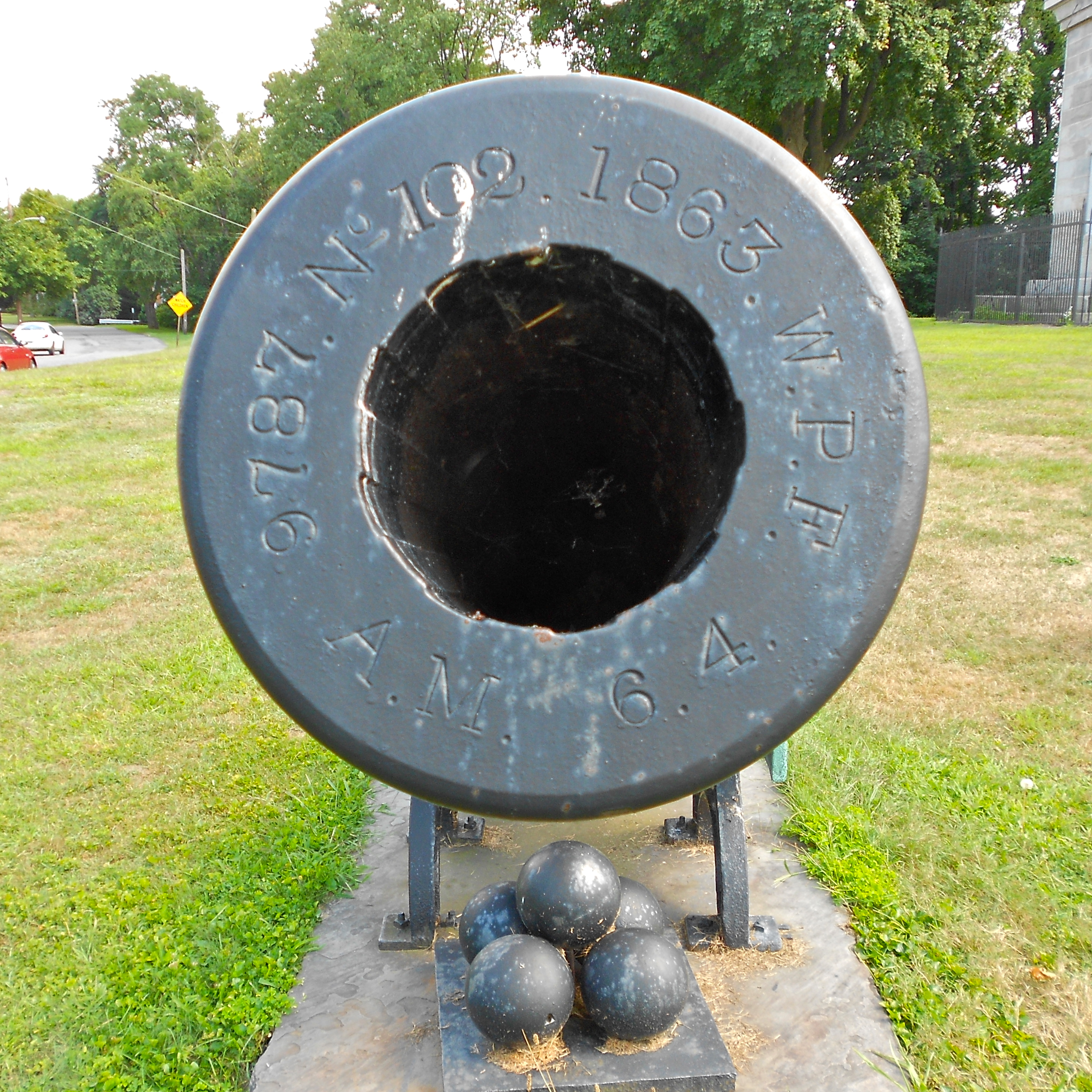
Mouth of one of the cannons at the monument
