= Luzerne Presbyterial Institute =

- U.S. National Register of Historic Places
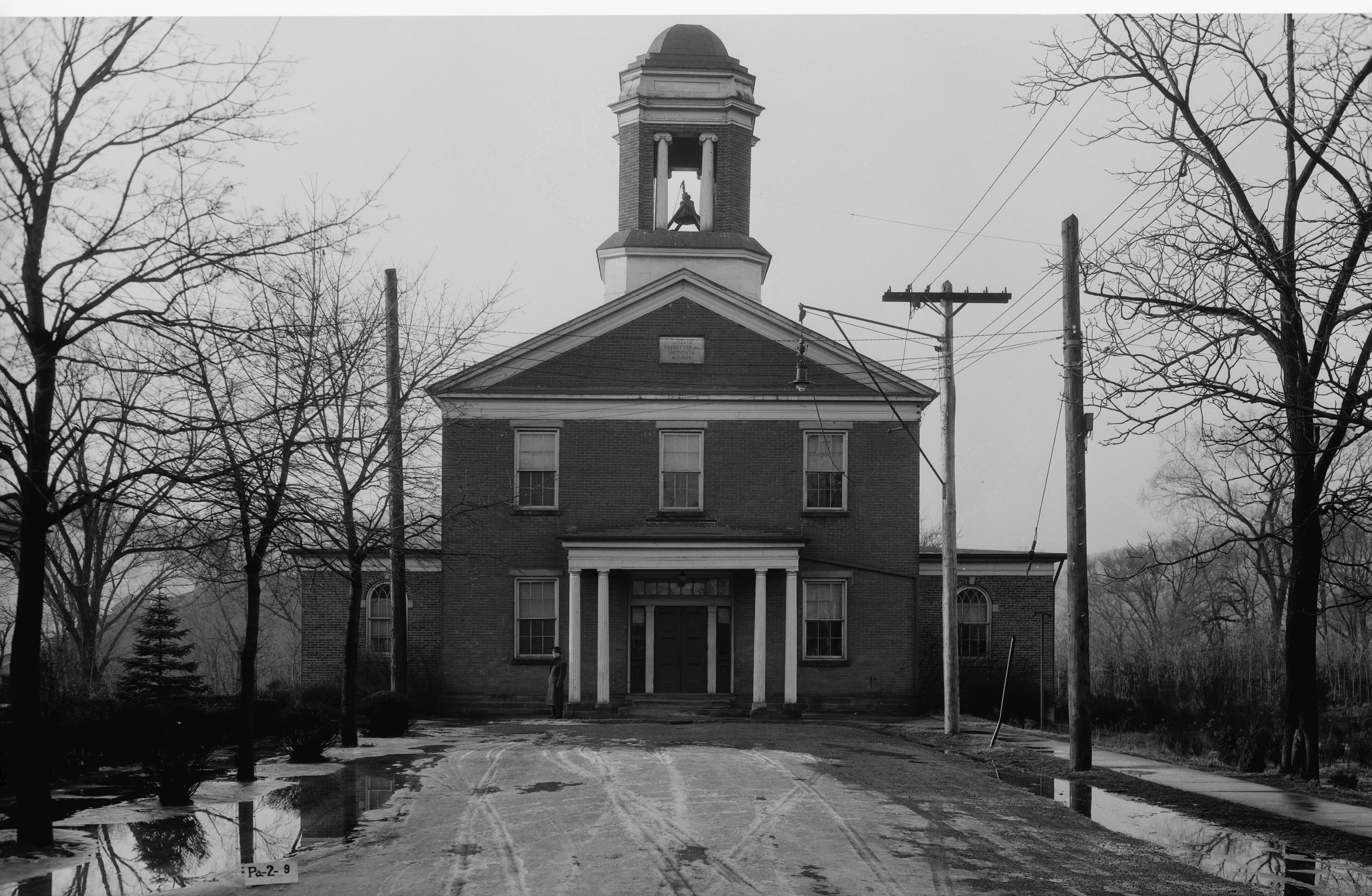

- Location within Pennsylvania Location within the United States
- Location: Institute St., Wyoming, Pennsylvania
- Coordinates: 41°18′39″N 75°50′29″W
- Area: 0.2 acres (0.081 ha)
- Built: 1849
- Architect: Fell, Daniel Ackley
- Architectural style: Greek Revival
- NRHP reference No.: 79002293
- Added to NRHP: September 07, 1979

Luzerne Presbyterial Institute, also known as the Wyoming Institute, is a historic church school on Institute Street in Wyoming, Pennsylvania. It was built in 1849 for use as a school, the Luzerne Presbyterial Institute, which closed in 1869. The building was then used as a Sunday school by the Wyoming Presbyterian Church.

It was added to the National Register of Historic Places in 1979.
