= Markle Banking & Trust Company Building =

- U.S. National Register of Historic Places
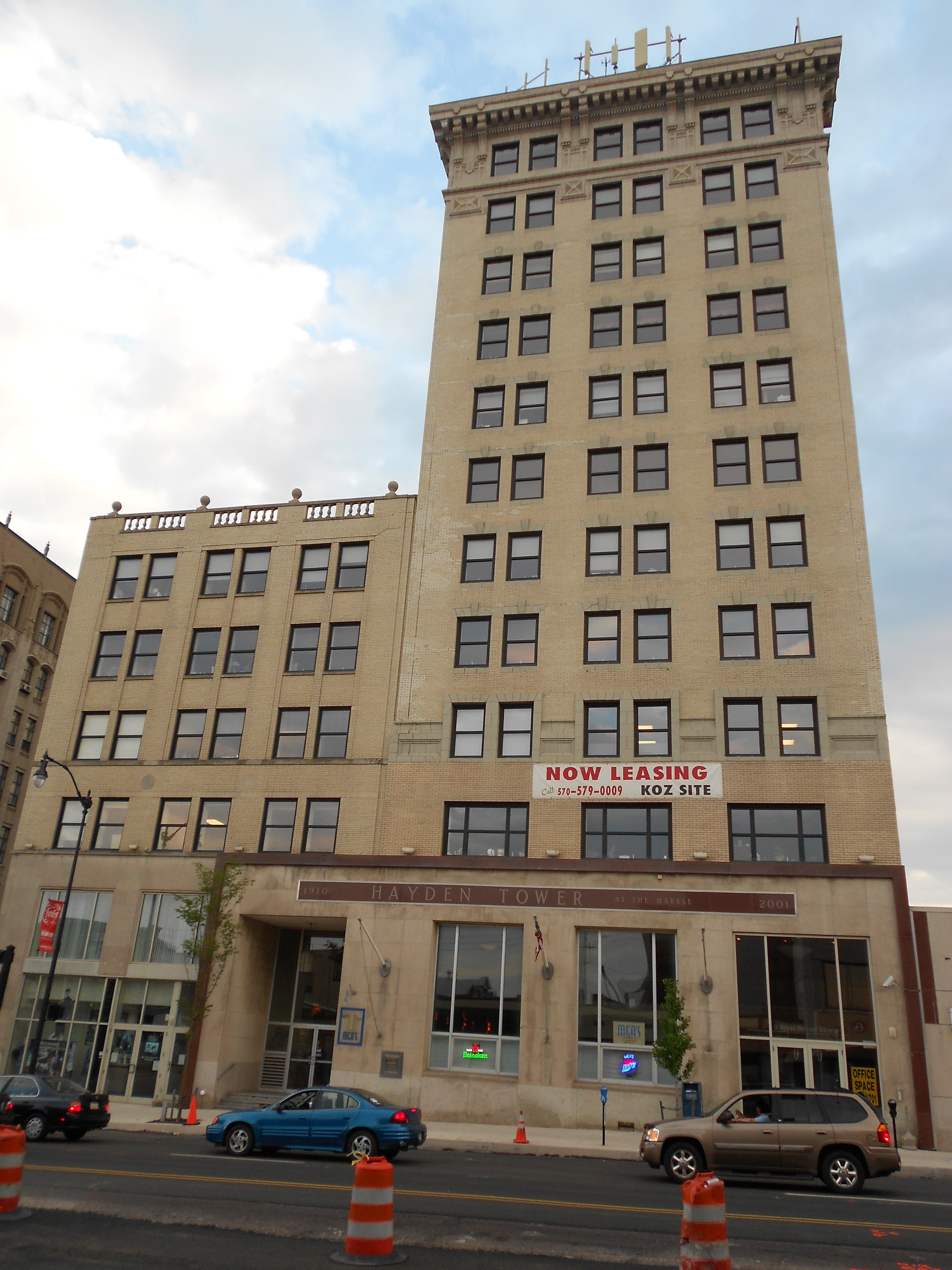
- Markle Building, 2013

- Location within Pennsylvania Location within the United States
- Location: 8 W. Broad St., Hazleton, Pennsylvania
- Coordinates: 40°57′14″N 75°58′29″W
- Area: less than one acre
- Built: 1910
- Architect: Bright, John Irwin; Bossom, Alfred C.
- Architectural style: Classical Revival
- NRHP reference No.: 96000322
- Added to NRHP: March 28, 1996

The Markle Banking & Trust Company Building, also known as the Markle Bank Building, Northeastern Building and, currently, as Hayden Tower, is an historic bank building in Hazleton, Luzerne County, Pennsylvania, United States.

== History and architectural features ==
This historic structure was built in 1910 and renovated twice, once in 1923 and again in 1928. It is an eleven-story commercial building that is three bays wide and seven bays deep, with a six-story addition that was designed in the Classical Revival style. It was built using reinforced concrete and faced with limestone.

== Gallery ==
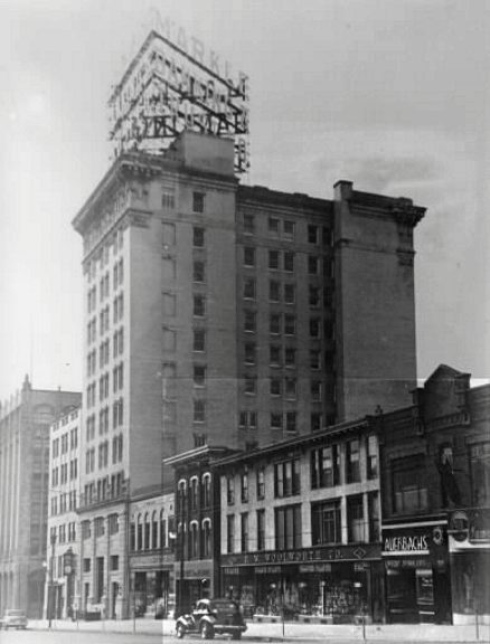
Markle Building, 1910
