= National Watch and Clock Museum =

Museum in Pennsylvania, United States

Coordinates: 40.0371°N 76.5021°W

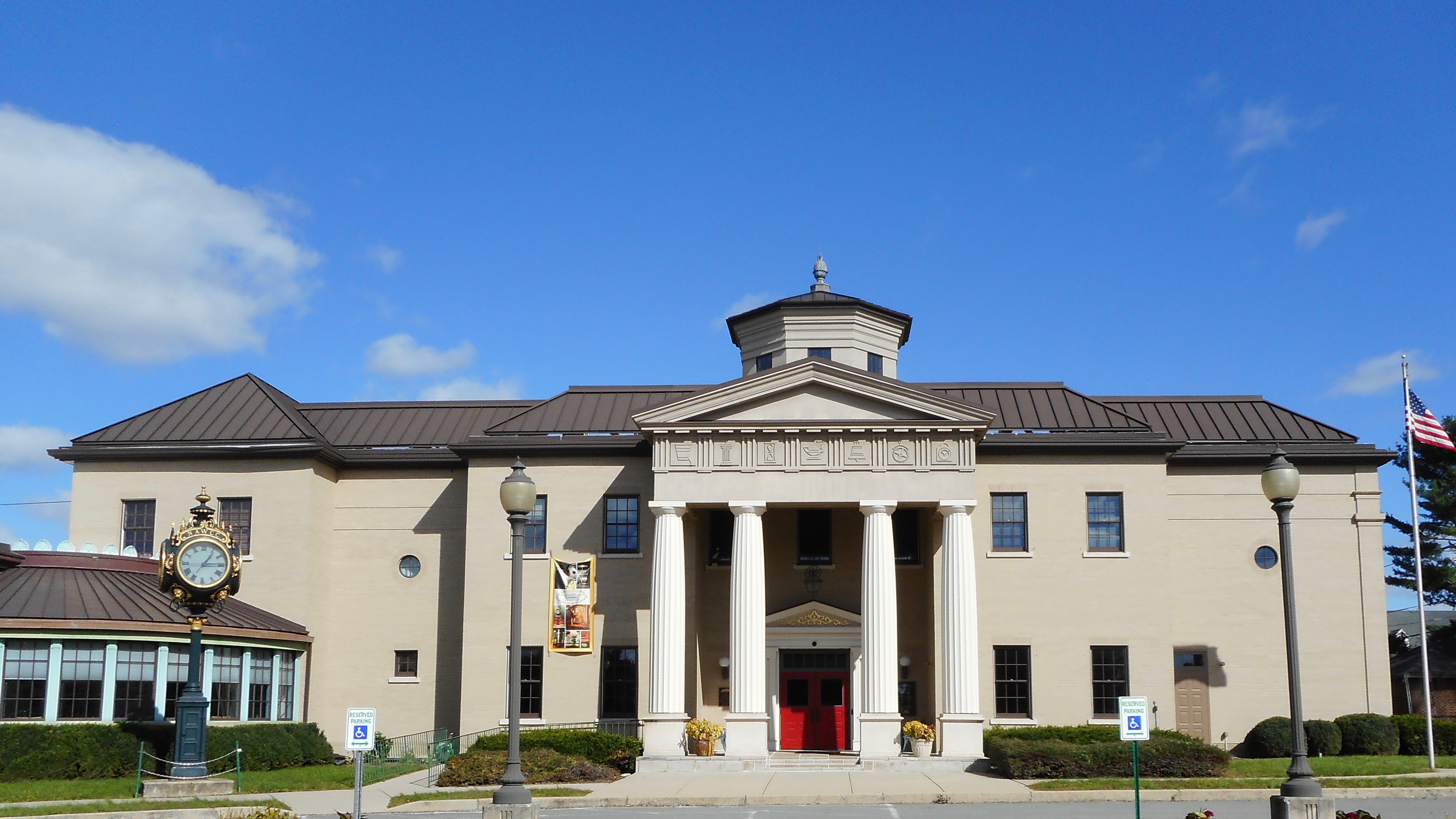
The National Watch and Clock Museum, Library & Research Center, and offices of the National Association of Watch and Clock Collectors

The National Watch and Clock Museum (NWCM), located in Columbia, Pennsylvania, is one of a very few museums in the United States dedicated solely to horology, which is the history, science and art of timekeeping and timekeepers.

Like its subsidiary institution, the NAWCC Library & Research Center, the National Watch and Clock Museum is operated by the National Association of Watch and Clock Collectors (NAWCC), a non-profit organization with about 10,000 members and an educational mission.

== History ==
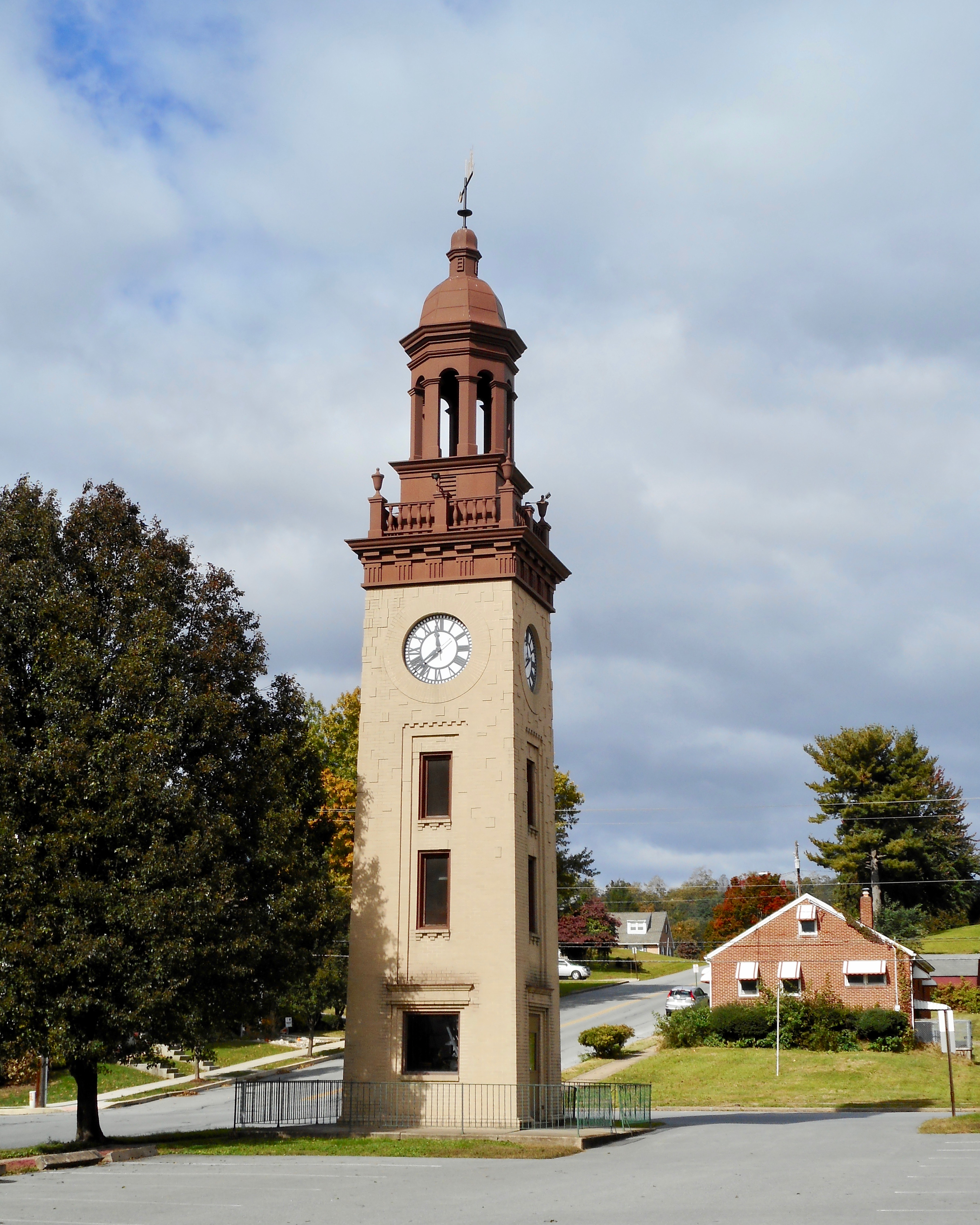
Clock tower

The National Watch and Clock Museum was founded in 1977 by the NAWCC and over time has put together a major collection of horological artifacts, mainly clocks and watches, but also related tools, machinery and ephemera, and has become an important institution in its field.

Most of the greatest and most important clocks and watches ever made have been preserved and exhibited — for decades if not centuries — as decorative art in such major museums around the world as the British Museum in London or the Metropolitan Museum in New York, or form a small department in the globally important museums of technology and science such as the Smithsonian Institution, the Musée des Arts et Métiers or the Deutsches Museum. There are only few museums like NWCM, dedicated principally to the history of timekeeping, and the majority of them - located in former centers of horological production - have primarily a local or regional focus.

Since the former "Time Museum" in Rockford, Illinois closed in the 1990s, the NWCM is often described as the broadest specialist horology museum in the country. (The only comparable museum in the United States is the American Clock & Watch Museum in Bristol, Conn., but that one is more focused on American-made timekeepers).

The museum, located near the Susquehanna River in Lancaster County's Pennsylvania Dutch Country tourist area, serves both a general public (including youth), as well as a specialized audience of horological aficionados (including NAWCC members), which appreciate its study collection and some of the more specialized temporary exhibits.

== Exhibits ==
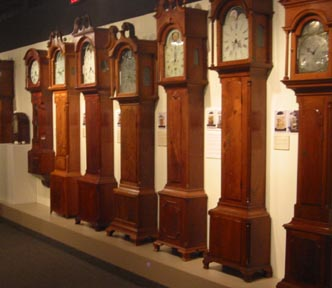
Longcase clocks

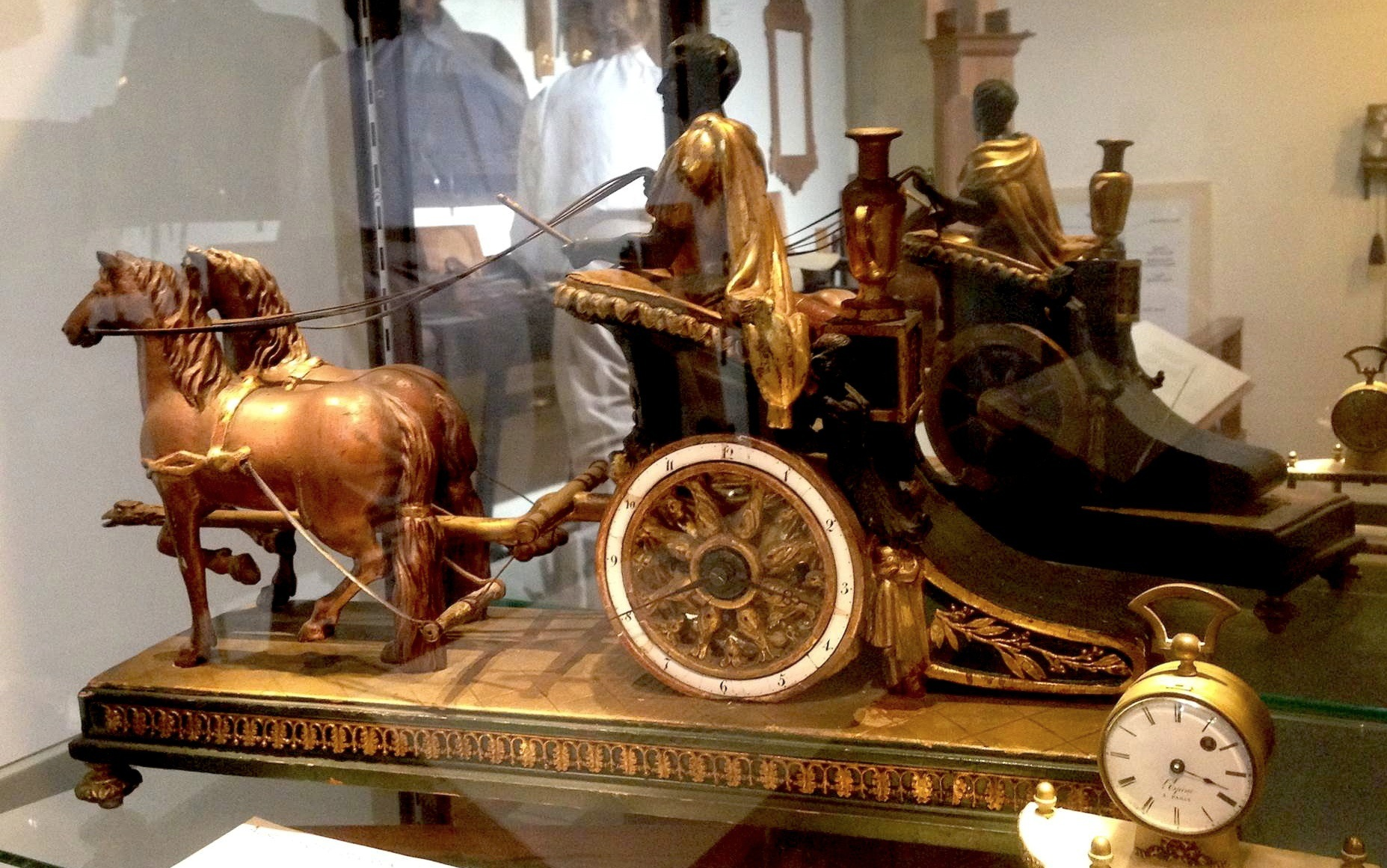
A rare Austrian chariot clock.

The museum attempts to show the complete history of timekeepers from the first non-mechanical devices (sundials, hourglasses, fireclocks) to the atomic clock and mass-produced wristwatches of the present. The museum's collections include over 12,000 clocks and watches, with about 3,000 on display.

There is a "Learning Center" introducing some of the basic technologies of the mechanical timekeeper, such as the pendulum, and a large and varied exhibit on many types of clock escapement. There is a sample of American-made tall case clocks (popularly known as "grandfather clocks"), a comprehensive exhibit on American watches, and a smaller area dedicated to automatic machinery used in watch manufacturing.

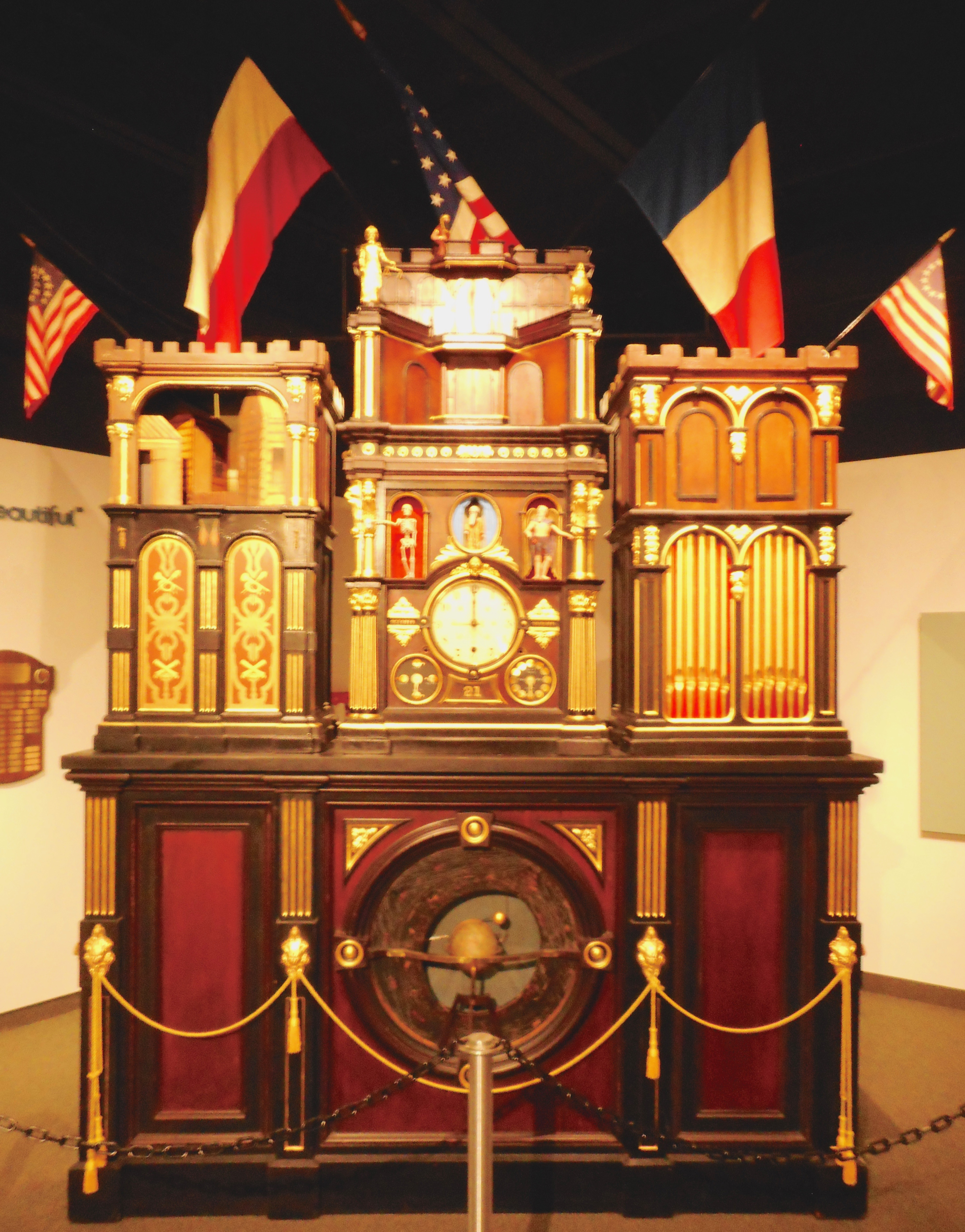
The Engle Monumental Clock

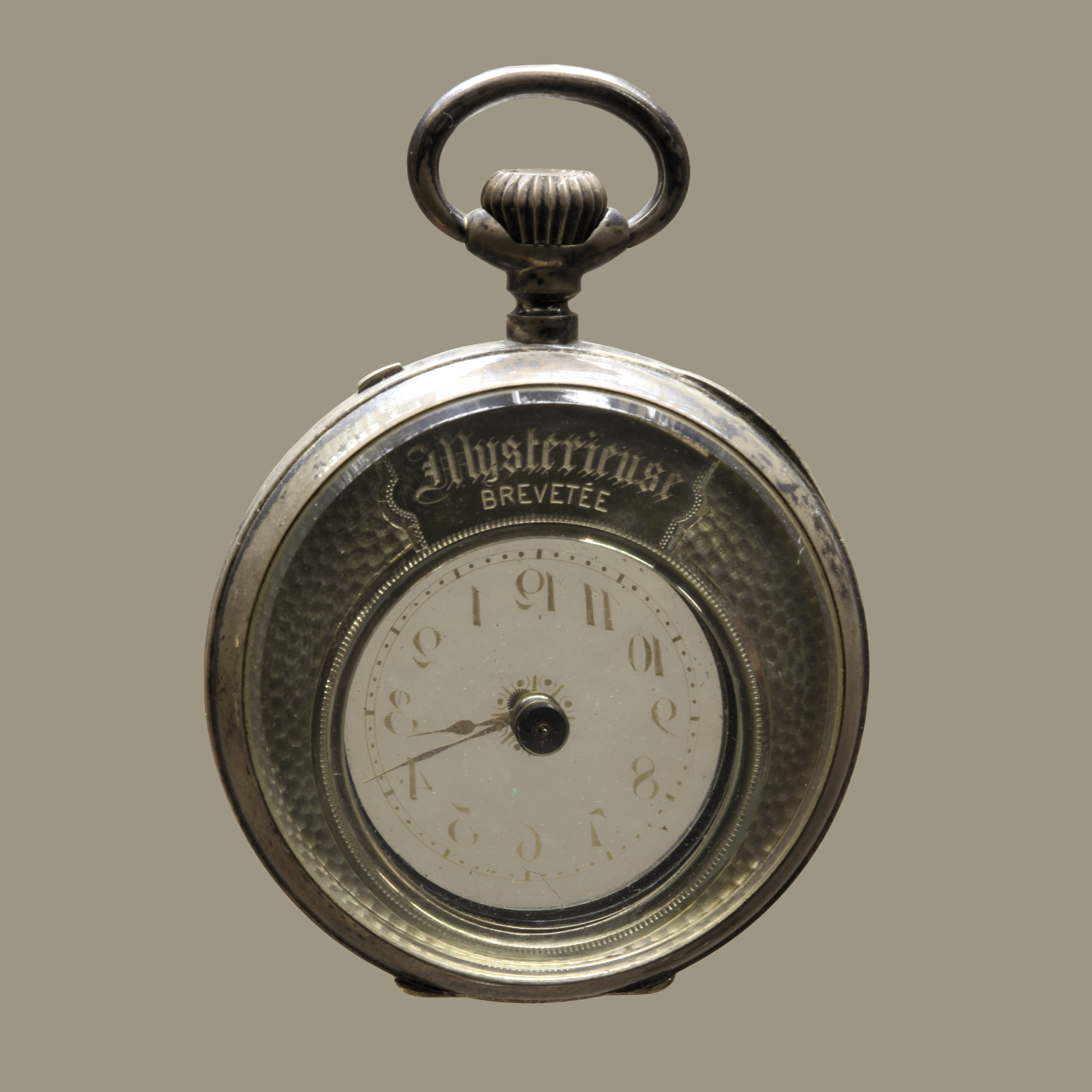
A "mystery watch" displayed at the Musée d'Art et d'Histoire (Neuchâtel), the NWCM also has this model in its collection.

Other highlights include an exhibit of the pioneering automated machinery developed by the American Waltham Watch Company, allowing for the first time to mass-produce watches using interchangeable parts, a large selection of American pocket watches (including Railroad watches), and the "Engle Clock", a complicated "monument" clock built by Stephen Decatur Engle of Hazleton, Pennsylvania. This clock took Engle about 20 years to complete, and it was shown for many years all around the United States starting in about 1877. The Engle clock disappeared in the early 1950s, and was found in a barn in New York State in 1983. The Engle clock was purchased and fully restored by the NAWCC in 1989 and is on display at the museum.

The NWCM has an ongoing schedule of temporary exhibits — usually two of them at a time, one devoted to a general timekeeping-related theme of interest to the public, and the other a more specialized show appealing primarily to horological collectors.
