= Engle Monumental Clock =

Monumental clock designed by Stephen Decatur Engle

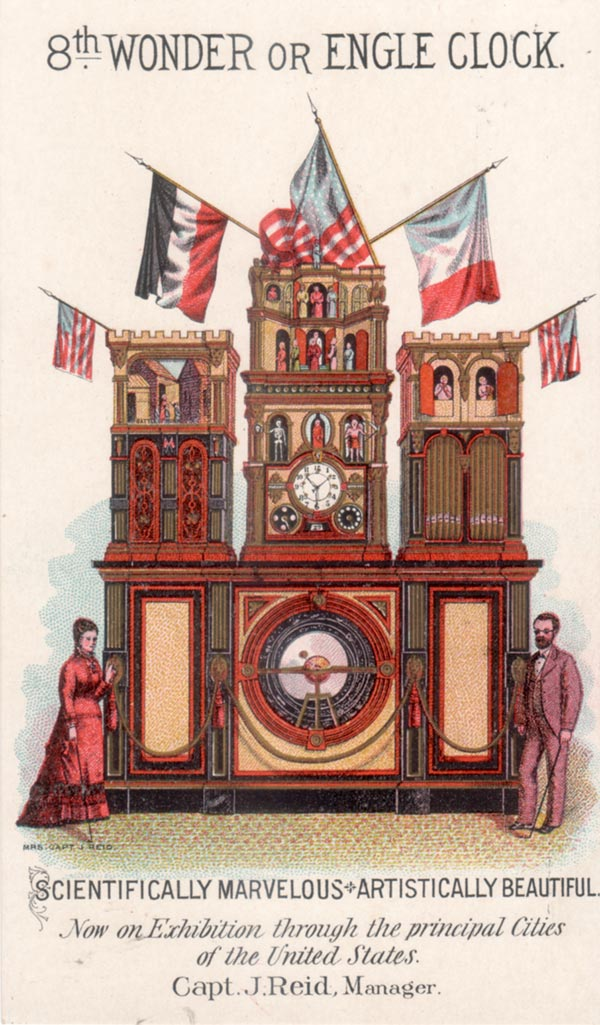
Promotional card from late 19th century of the Engle Monumental Clock

The Engle Monumental Clock is a monumental clock designed by Stephen Decatur Engle.

== History ==
The first known monumental clock made in the United States was the Engle Monumental Clock. The clock was made entirely by clock designer Stephen Decatur Engle in Hazleton, Pennsylvania. It took Engle 20 years to complete the construction of this clock which was finished in 1878. Wanting to display the clock rather than turning a profit, he turned the clock over to two Philadelphia entrepreneurs who marketed the clock as "The Eighth Wonder of the World." They toured the clock throughout the Eastern United States, charging 15–25 cents to view it. It continued to tour across the Eastern United States for 70 years before decades of wear caused its retirement in 1951. It was recovered by the National Watch and Clock Museum in 1988, which still exhibits it today.

== Features ==
The Engle Monumental Clock measures 11' high, 8' wide, and 3' deep and contains three towers. "Among its mechanical features are two organ movements, 48 moving figures, and a new type of tellurian (patented by Engle) that illustrates the positions of the moon, constellations, and zodiac relative to the rotating earth." The clock also indicates the day of the week, current month, the phase of the moon, and even the current tides. The clock's first promoter was so convinced of its "technical complexity" that he offered a reward of $50,000 to anyone who found a clock that did "more and worked better."

The clock used a number of moving figures including Jesus Christ, the twelve Apostles, the three Marys, Satan, Father Time, the three Ages of Man, Death, Justice, Orpheus, and Linus. Stephen Engle placed an image of himself representing "Middle Age" as his signature of the clock's maker. On the hour, a skeleton representing Death strikes a bone against a skull attached to the column of the clock. At 15, 30, and 45 minutes past the hour, Father Time strikes a bell with a scythe and turns his sandglass while the central figures of Youth, Middle Age, and Old Age revolve in the arch above the clock dial. At 40 minutes past the hour, a group of revolutionary soldiers appear from the clock while a barrel organ plays "patriotic tunes". At 55 minutes past the hour, the three Marys come out of the center tower as a procession of the Apostles takes place accompanied by hymns.
