= National Association of Watch and Clock Collectors =

American nonprofit association

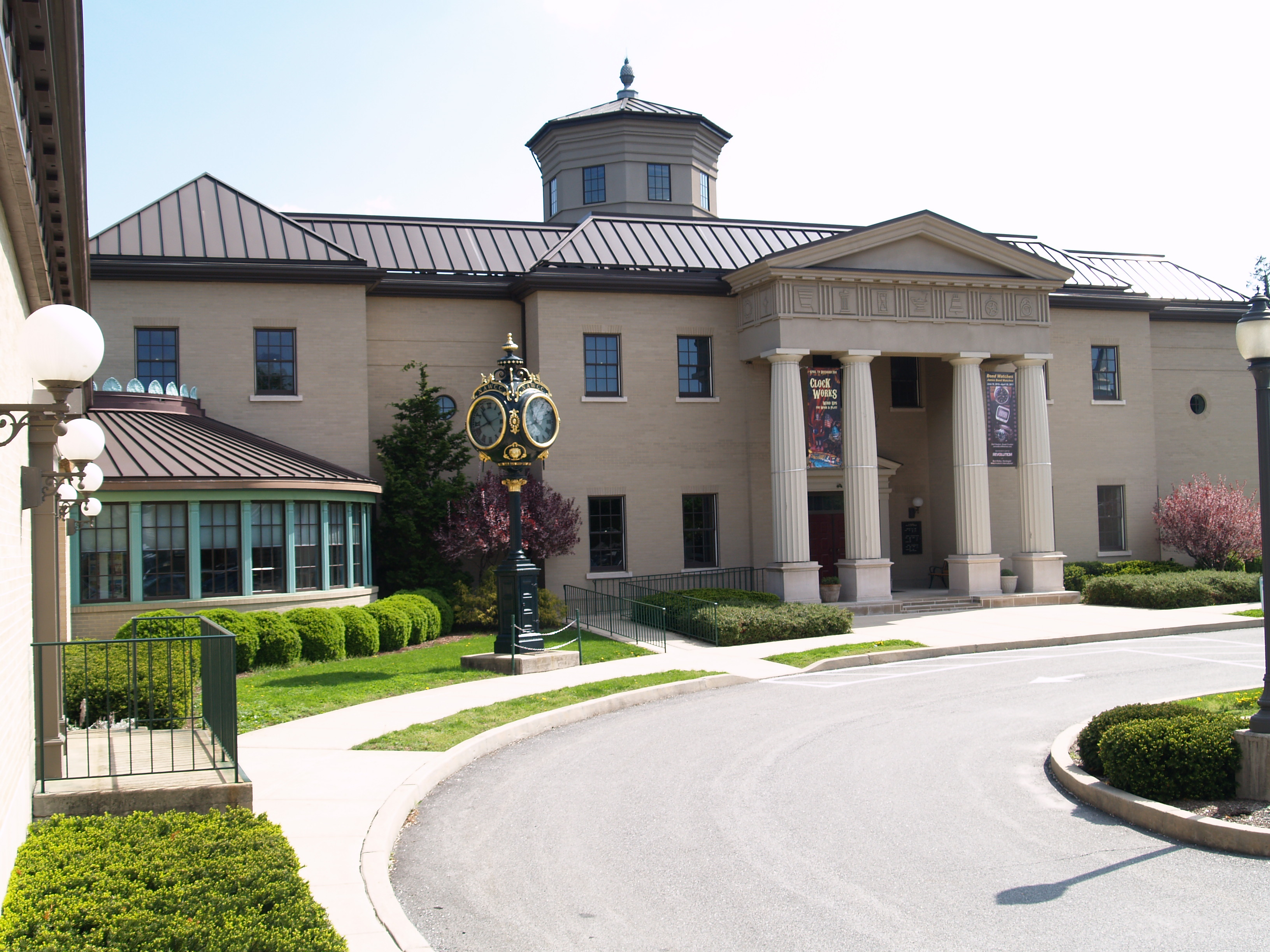
National Watch and Clock Museum, Library and Research Center and offices of the National Watch and Clock collectors Association

The National Association of Watch & Clock Collectors, Inc. (NAWCC) is a nonprofit association of people who share a passion for collecting watches and clocks and studying horology (the art and science of time and timekeeping). The NAWCC's global membership is composed of nearly 10,000 individuals, businesses, and institutions, with more than 1.25 million users accessing its main website and online Forums each year. The Forums, offer NAWCC members and nonmembers the opportunity to ask questions about watches and clocks.

The NAWCC was founded in 1943 by members of the Horological Society of New York and the Philadelphia Watchmakers' Guild who wished to create a national organization focused on providing education and advocacy for horology. Many of the members participate in one or more of the 145 "chapters" that are based on a locality or a special interest (e.g., the local chapter for New York is Chapter 2, and the Tower Clock Chapter is Chapter 134). The vast majority of chapters are based in the United States, though a number are also in Canada, the UK, China, Australia, and Japan. Special interest chapters range from "British Horology" to "Horological Science." The NAWCC's annual Ward Francillon Time Symposium is held in October, where eminent speakers present their research on a focused topic.

The NAWCC provides members with bimonthly publications: the Watch & Clock Bulletin and Mart & Highlights. The Bulletin contains articles from watch and clock professionals as well as amateur enthusiasts. The Mart offers space to advertise timepieces or goods and services useful to NAWCC members, and also provides a venue for NAWCC Chapters from around the world to share their members’ latest activities. The NAWCC and its Chapters hold local, regional and national meetings and events focused on timepieces and timekeeping topics. Many of these events are open to the public.

The National Watch and Clock Museum was founded in 1977 by the NAWCC. The Museum has the largest collection of horological artifacts in North America and has one of the largest library and research centers in the world devoted to the study of time and timekeeping. The Museum, the Fortunat Mueller-Maerki Library & Research Center and NAWCC headquarters are located in Columbia, PA. The NAWCC also runs numerous education programs for both professionals and hobbyists at its School of Horology in Columbia, PA. Classes examine topics such as watch and clock repair.
