= Chariot clock =

Figural clock in the form of a chariot

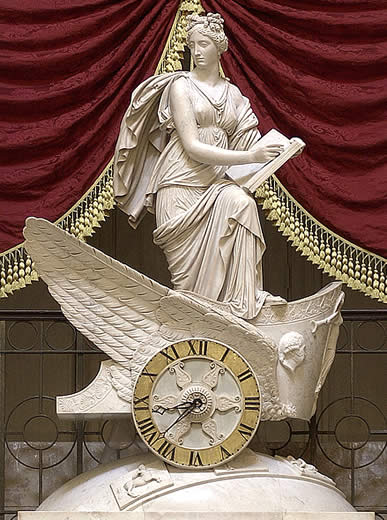
Car of History by Carlo Franzoni, 1819, features a life size statue of Clio, the muse of history. It is the largest chariot clock ever made, and is exhibited in National Statuary Hall, US Capitol.

A chariot clock is a type of mantel/table figural clock in the form of a chariot whose dial is set into the wheel or elsewhere, its origins date back to the second half of the 16th century southern Germany. Normally of classical mythology subject matter, it has been made in different periods and styles such as Renaissance, Louis XV, Louis XVI, Empire, Napoleon III, Art Deco, etc.

== History ==
=== Origins: 16th century ===
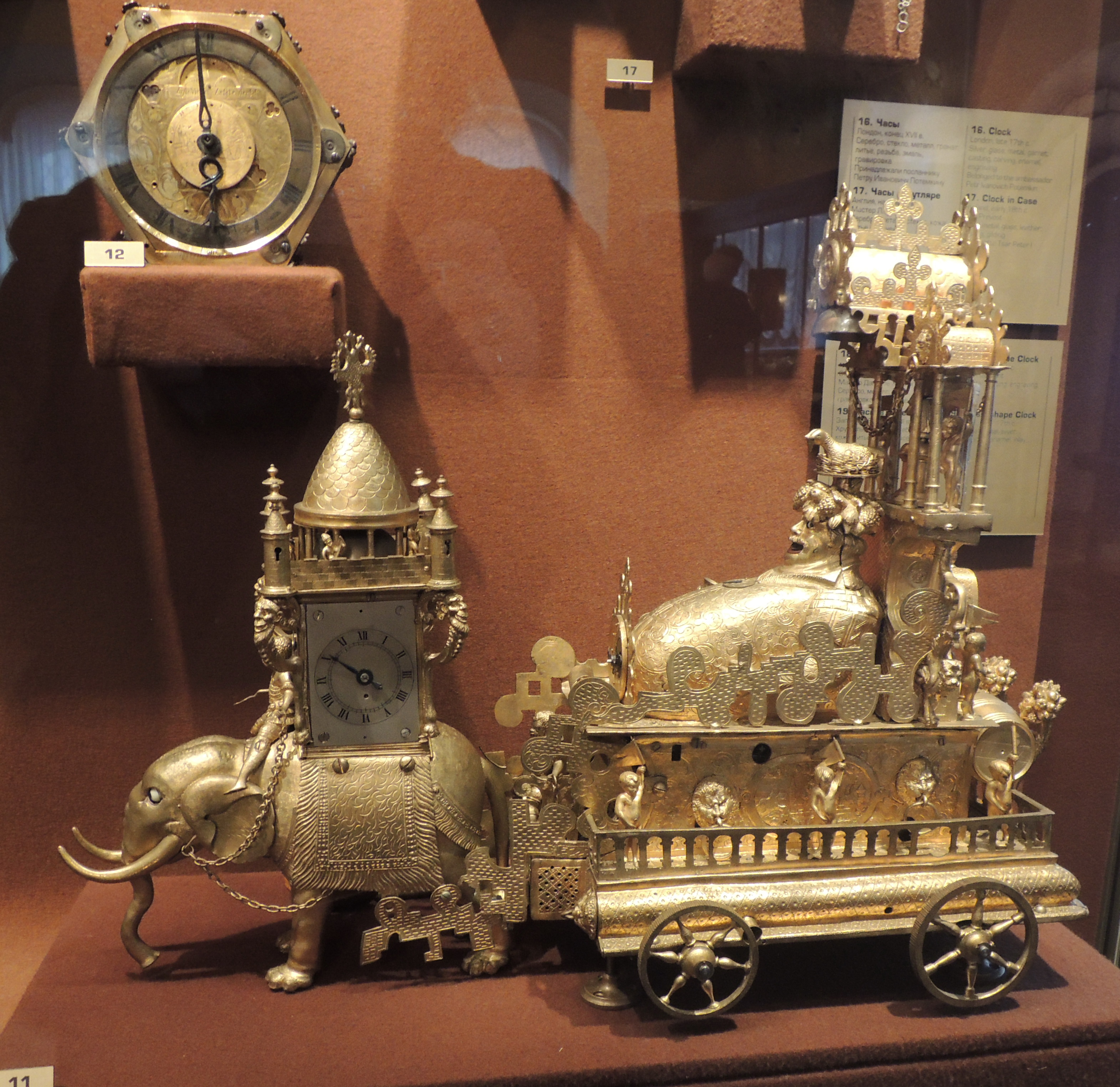
Automaton chariot clock, Augsburg second half of the 16th century. It is believed it was a gift to Tzar Ivan the Terrible.

In the historical context of the Renaissance, the so-called chariot clocks born in South Germany, a centre for clockmaking in Europe that flourished between 1550 and 1650, the leading cities being Augsburg, Nuremberg and Munich.

They were self-moving four-wheeled tabletop clocks that included automata figurines and some a musical movement too. The German examples have not the dial inserted in the wheel, but in the seat or some other place.

Most of them were fabricated in Augsburg, although several existing clocks cannot be located due to the lack of inscriptions or hallmarks and are therefore ascribed only to South German workshops. These rare and very costly pieces were only afforded by the nobility and royal courts.

=== An unprecedented boom: Late 1790s - mid 1820s ===
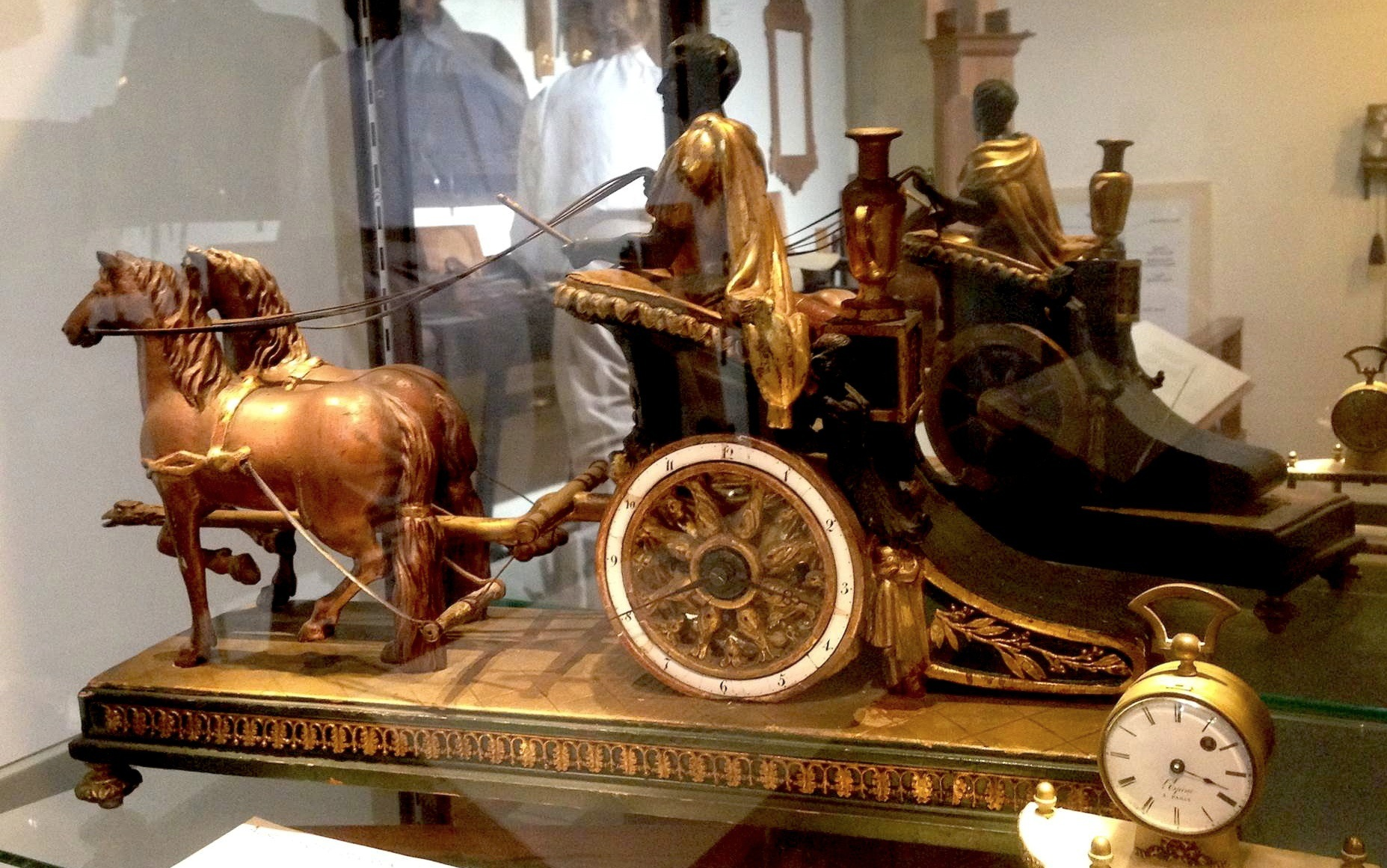
A rare Austrian chariot clock whose case is carved in wood, c. 1810. National Watch and Clock Museum.

In the 18th century France, during the Louis XV and Louis XVI reigns, a few models in the Louis XV and Louis XVI styles respectively, were made, but it was not until the period between the late 1790s and the mid-1820s that this type of mantel clock found true popularity. Its revival was largely inspired by Napoleon Bonaparte's conquests and victories in battles, though it continued to be in vogue after his definitive fall in 1815, specifically until the mid-1820s.

Its popularity in much of Europe gave rise to a wide diversity of models and versions in France, allowing the fullest opportunity for the sculptor and bronzesmith to express their creativity and the brilliance of their craft. The freedom of trade initiated by the French Revolution allowed many casters, who during the ancien régime worked in workshops strictly limited to making bronze, to develop large factories. They took advantage of this opportunity to execute all stages of bronze making within one factory and drew, cast, gilded, assembled and sold objects of their own workshops. Artisans still benefited from pre-Revolution training and worked according to the standards of a luxury art from the ancien régime, but they had better means of production and organization. Once freed from the technical constraints, the artists were able to give free rein to their imagination to create a multitude of models.

This coincided in time with the golden age of the French decorative bronze using the ormolu technique, with a whole series of celebrated bronzesmiths creating masterpieces of design, craftsmanship and good taste, one of the most famous being Pierre-Philippe Thomire. All followed the same basic design, featuring an ancient chariot (two or four-wheeled) on top of a rectangular, oval, oblong or mixtilinear base made out of bronze or stone, carrying figures of classical mythology deities, with the majority of them having the dial set into the wheel. Unlike the German predecessors, the chariot does not move and automata figures are rarely seen.

In common with the rest of the French Empire style mantel clocks of the period, the allegorical pendules au char (chariot clocks) also had a meaning, served a political ideology and often exalted moral values: Heroism, bravery, military virtues, love and fidelity, study and encouragement of arts and sciences, etc. They also have an educational power with evocative themes and narrative scenes in relief at the base.

Regarding the material of the clock cases, most of them were cast in bronze or bronze combined with stone, occasionally carved in wood. Pieces entirely executed in stone are also rare.

Apart from France, in the first quarter of the 19th century, although to a much lesser extent, Empire style chariot clocks were also made in Austria, England, Italy and Sweden.

=== Gallery: Empire style ===
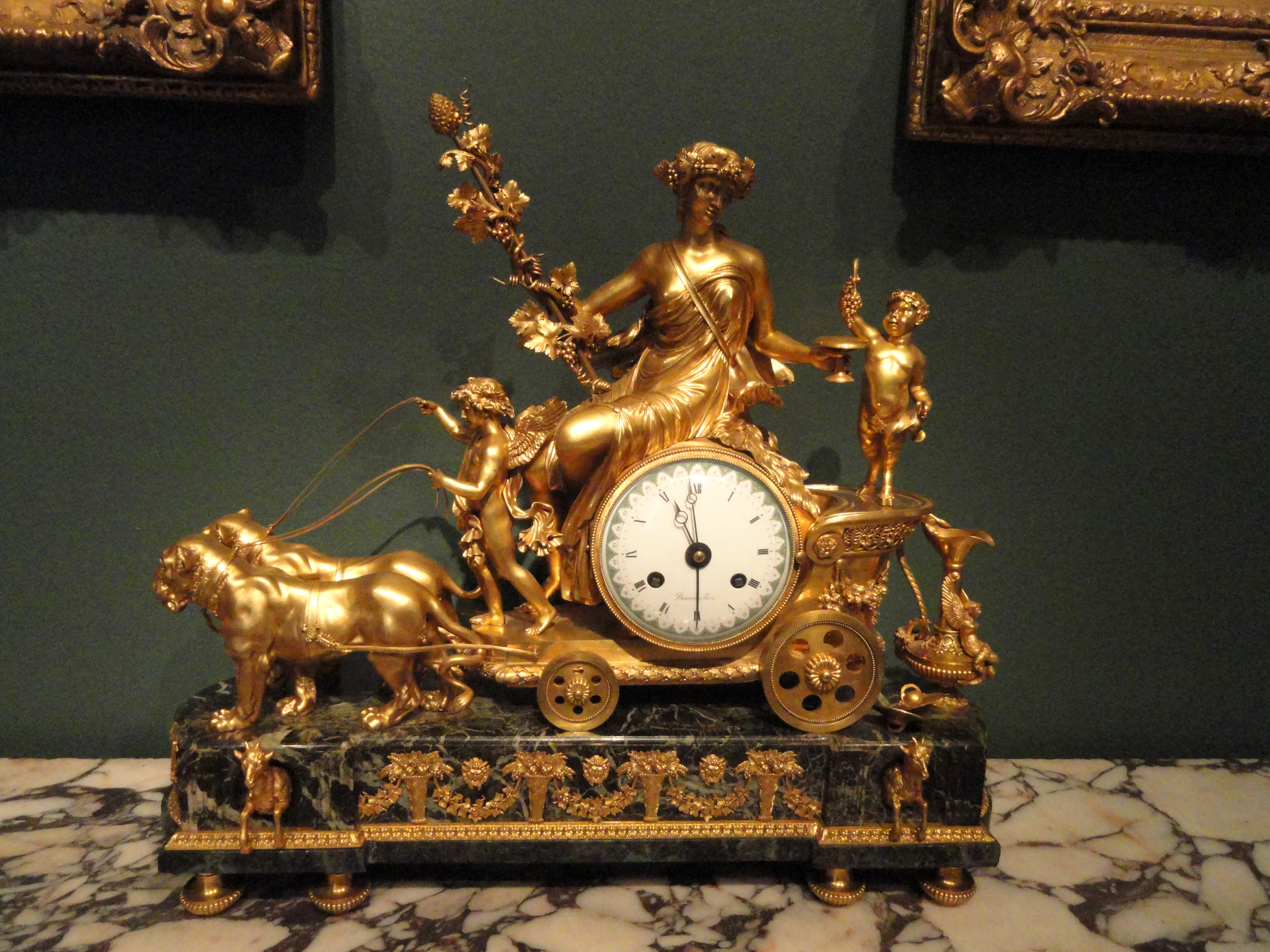
Allegorical clock of the harvest featuring a Bacchante. Consulate period, France, c. 1800.

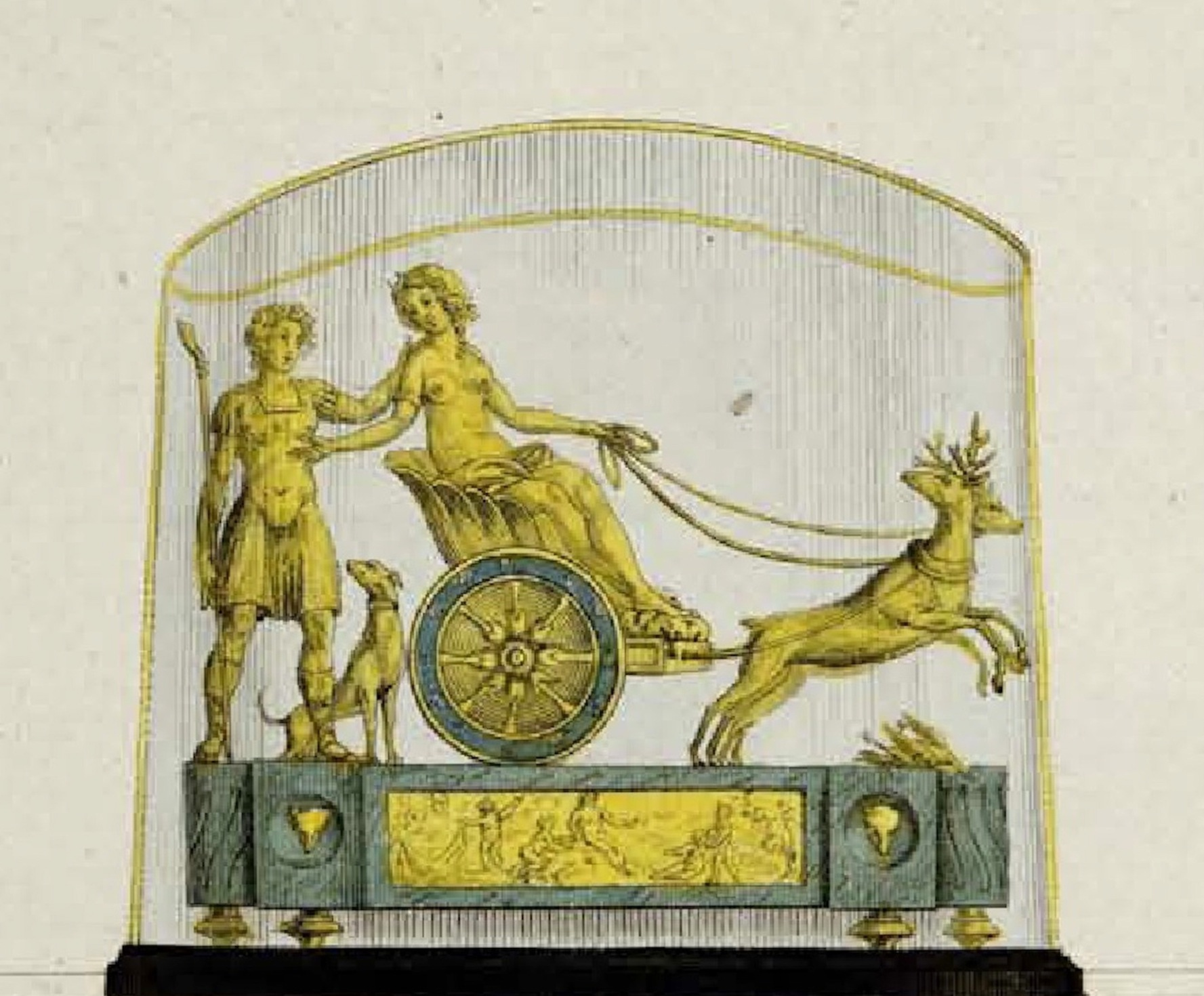
Drawing depicting the goddess Diana, France, 1802.

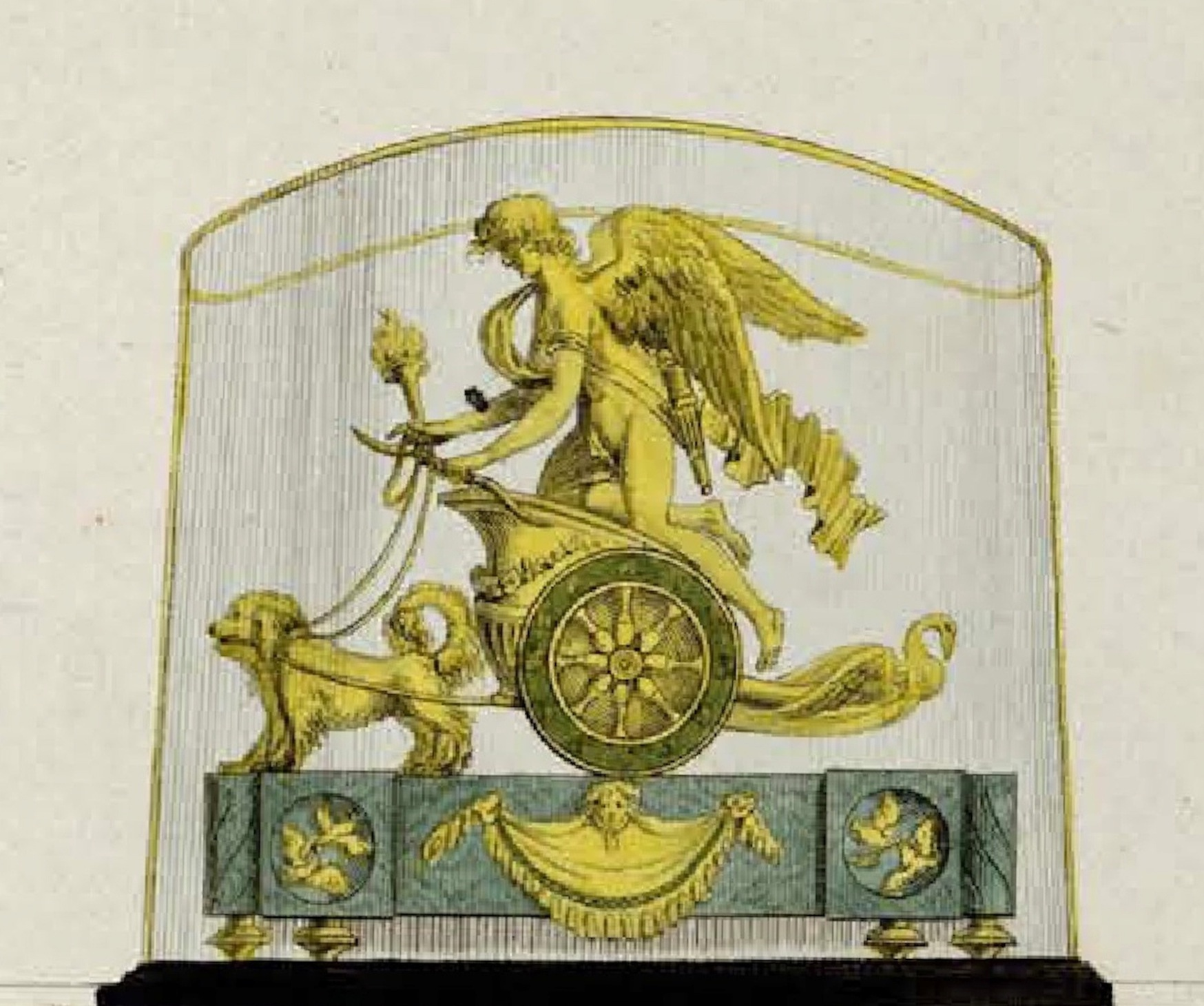
Drawing depicting the god Eros, France, 1802.

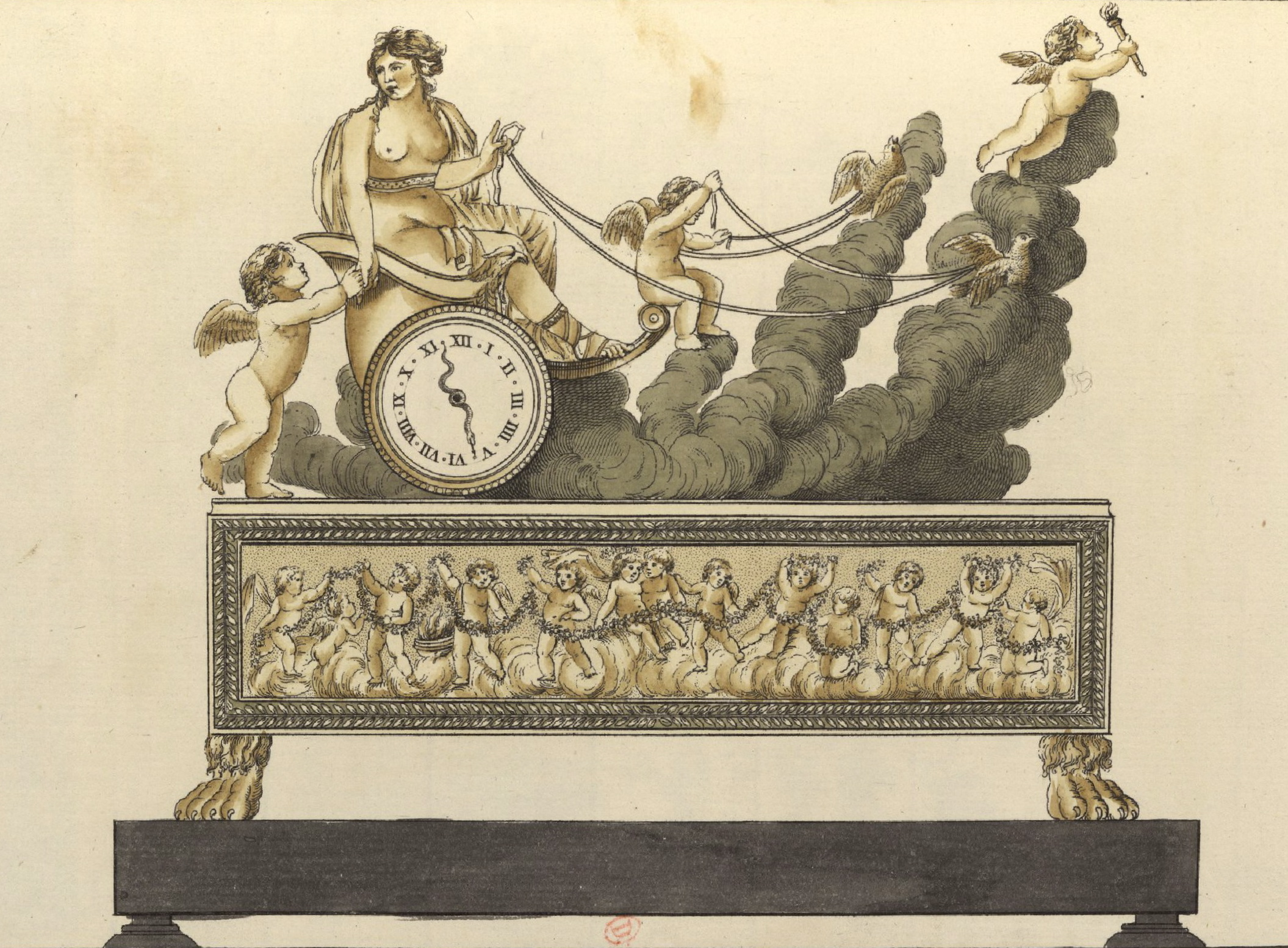
Drawing of a chariot clock depicting Venus by Jean-Simon Deverberie, France, between 1801 and 1821.

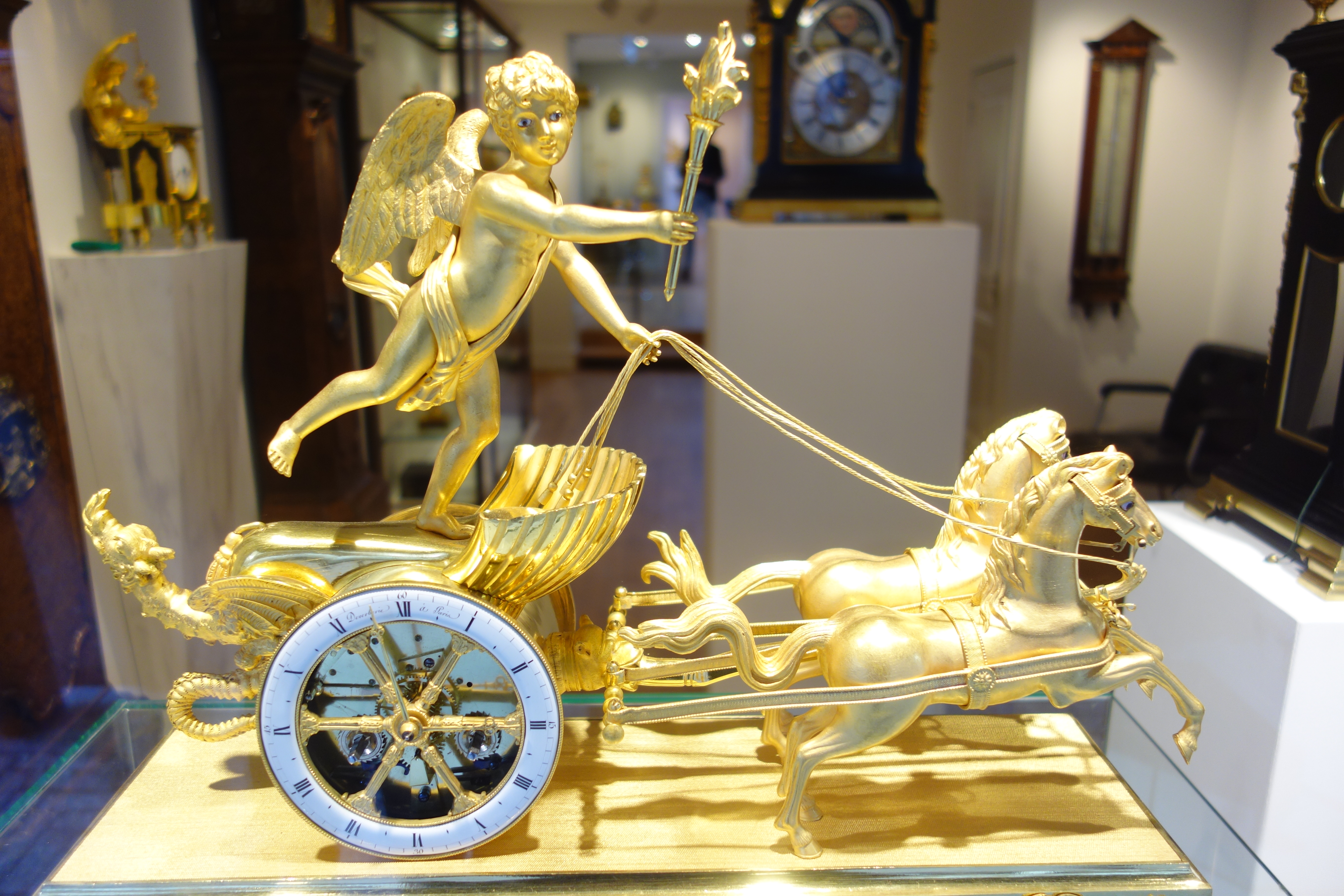
An ormolu chariot clock depicting the god Eros holding a flaming torch, France, first quarter of the 19th century.

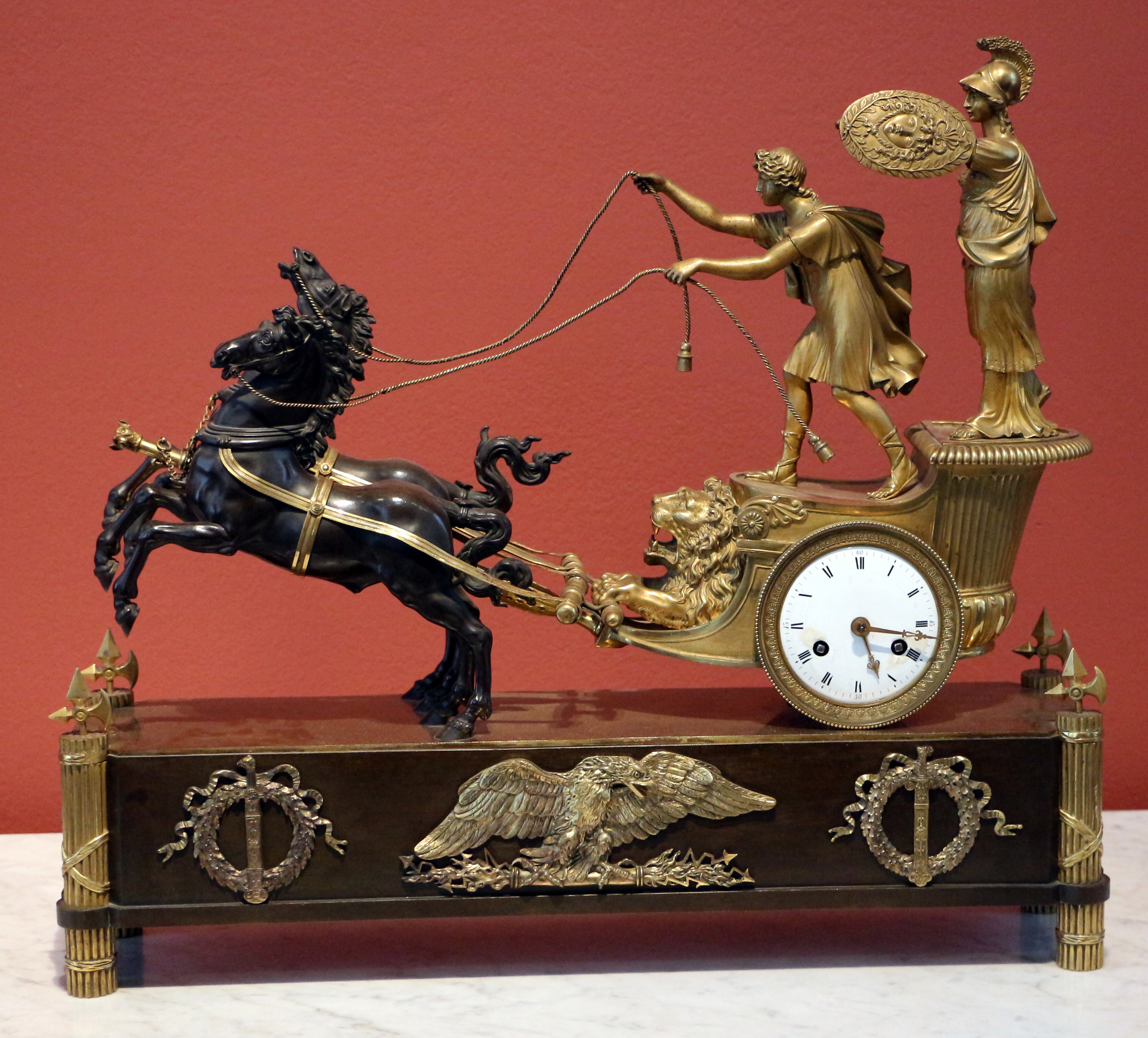
A well-known model of a chariot clock in the Empire style, the chariot of Telemachus by Jean-André Reiche, France, c. 1809.

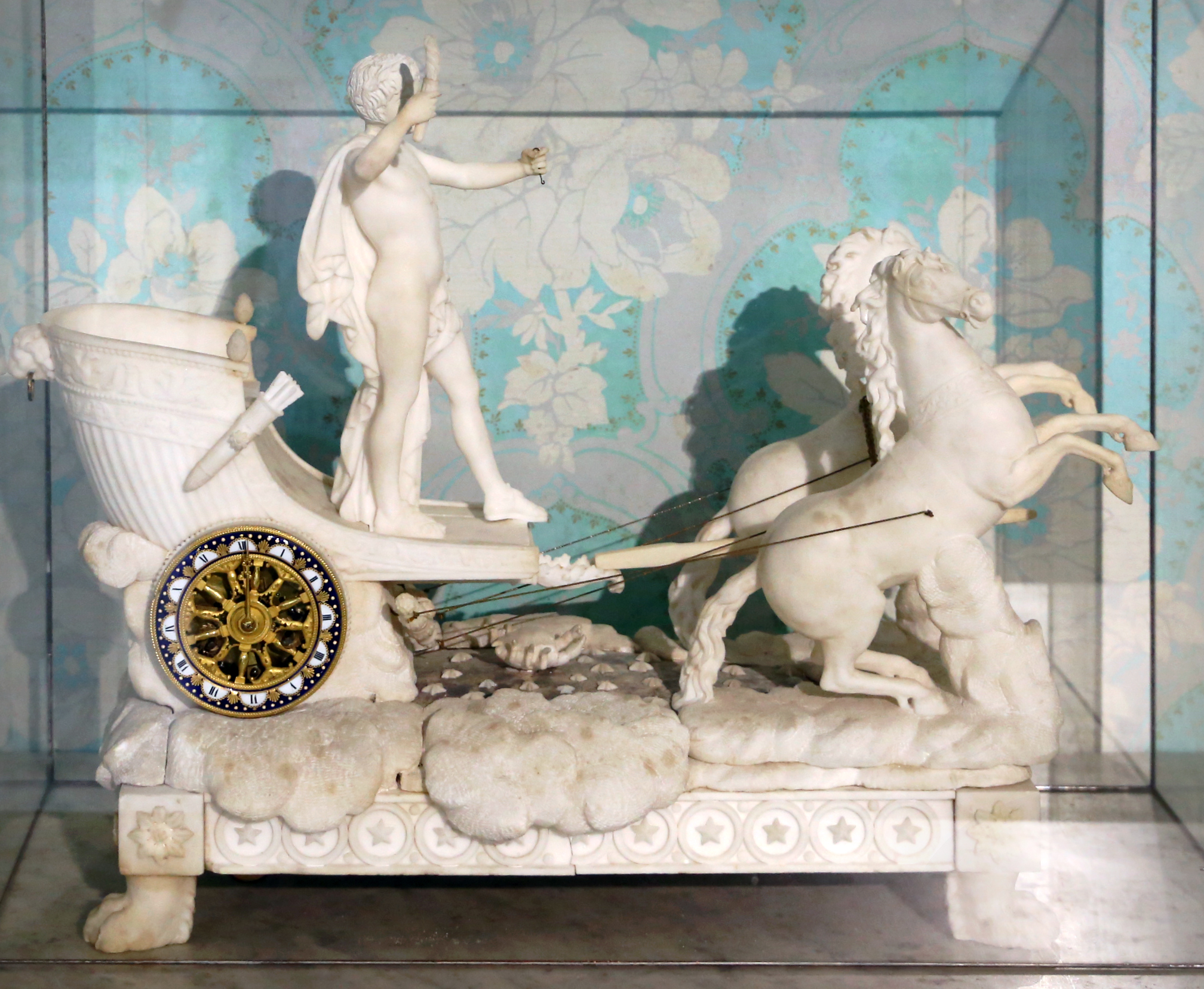
An unusual example whose case is entirely carved in stone, between 1800 and 1815.

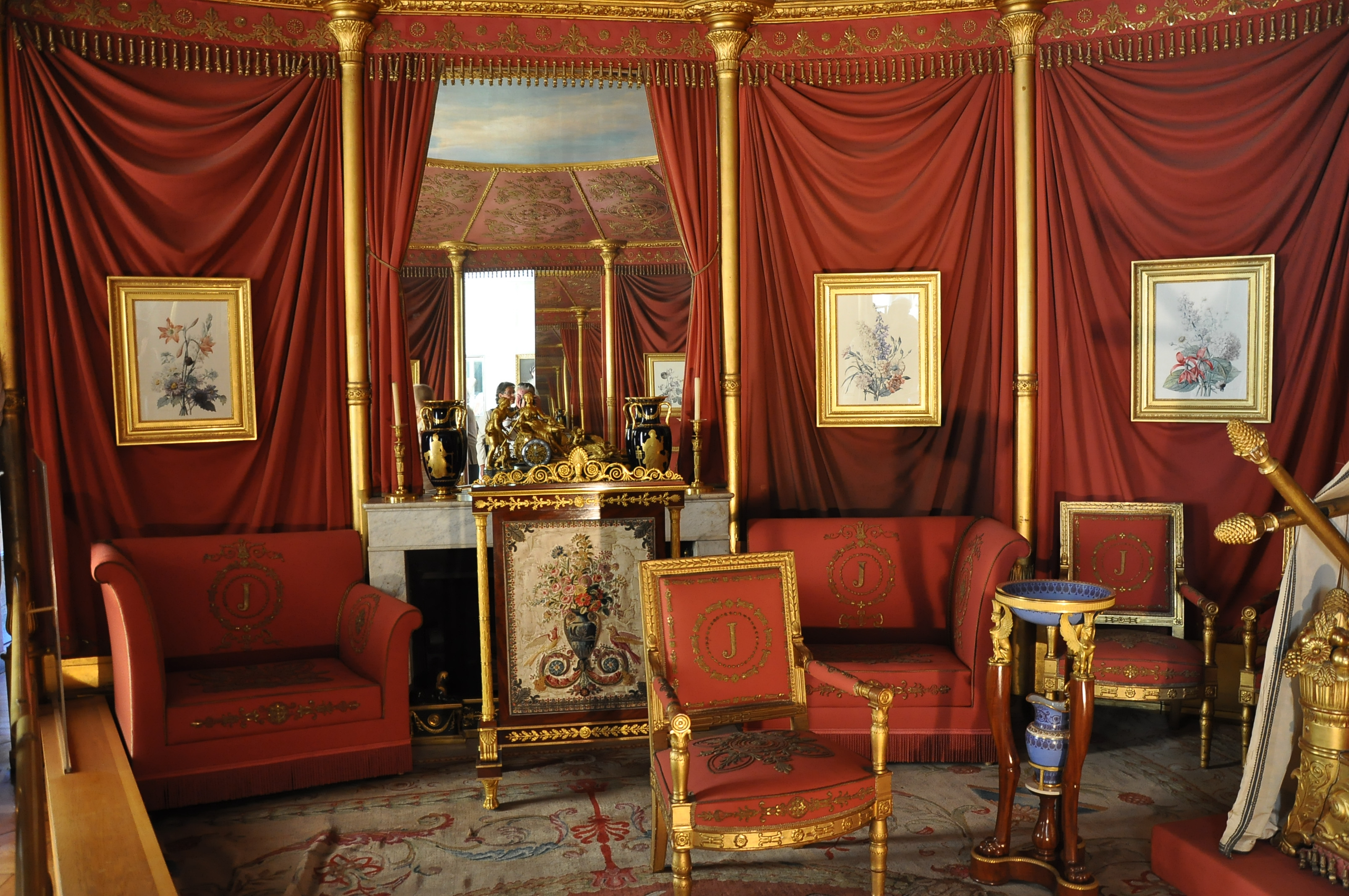
The Empire style chariot clocks aimed to decorate the mantel and console tables of palaces, mansions, etc., complementing the décor. Château de Malmaison, France.

=== Variety of styles (second half of the 19th century until the present) ===
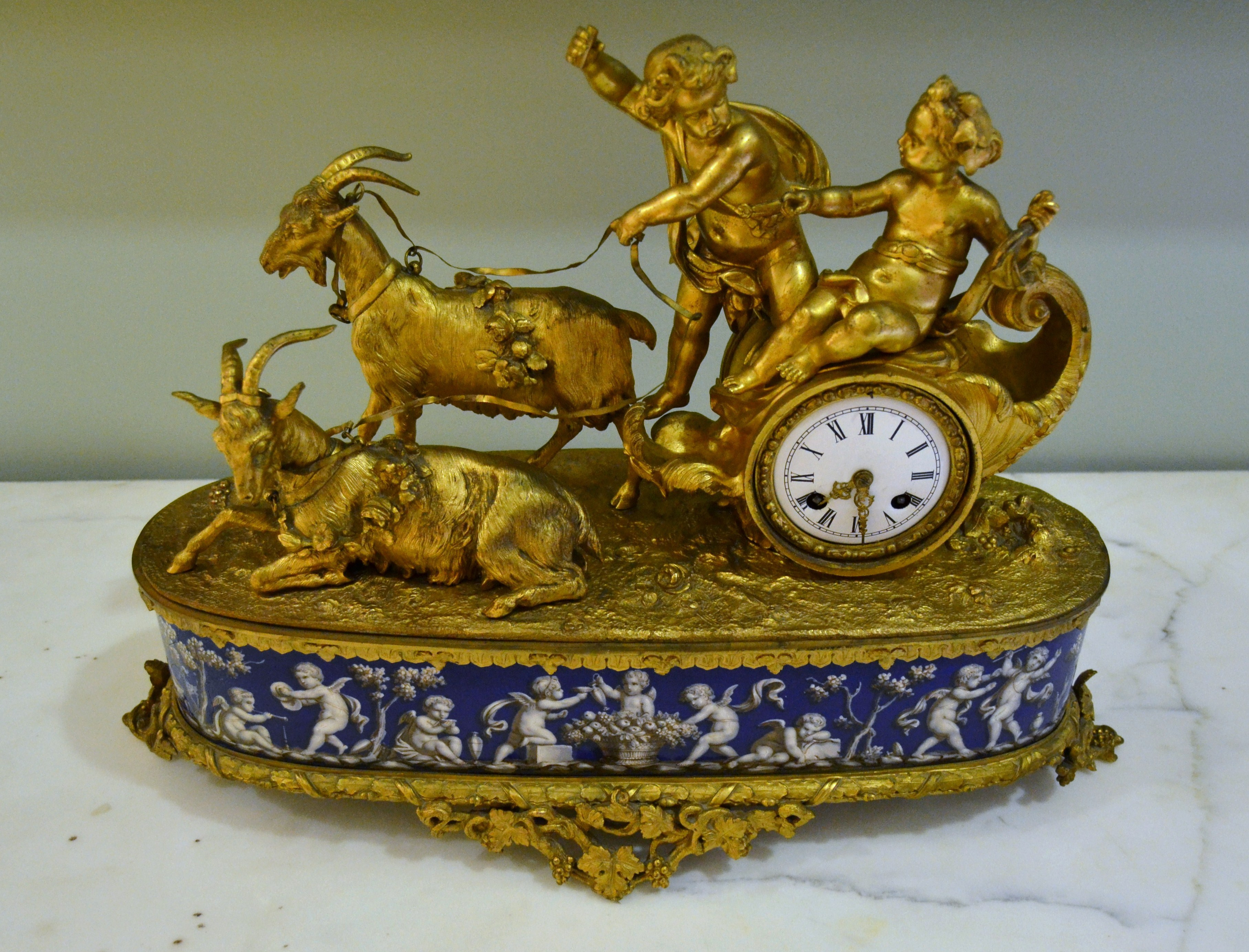
Left: An example in the Napoleon III style. France, c. 1870

During the second half of the 19th century and early 20th, this type of clock was produced again in France, some were replicas/versions of Empire style preexisting models, while others were new designs crafted in the style of the day, like Napoleon III, or inspired in styles of the past, such as Louis XV or Rococo, Louis XVI and Empire. Regarding the materials used in the clock cases, they were made in bronze, spelter, biscuit porcelain and porcelain.

In the United States, the New Haven clock company produced a model in the 1900s. Likewise, at the same time the Waterbury clock company commercialized a similar model, but the chariot was pulled by two little bisons instead of a pair of doves like the New Haven model.

Among the range of models of the French company Berlot-Mussier (they used the trade name ODYV between 1927 and 1940) there were one in the Art Deco style with the case made out of faience they sold in the 1930s.
