= Sybertsville, Pennsylvania =

Unincorporated community in Pennsylvania, US

- Unincorporated community
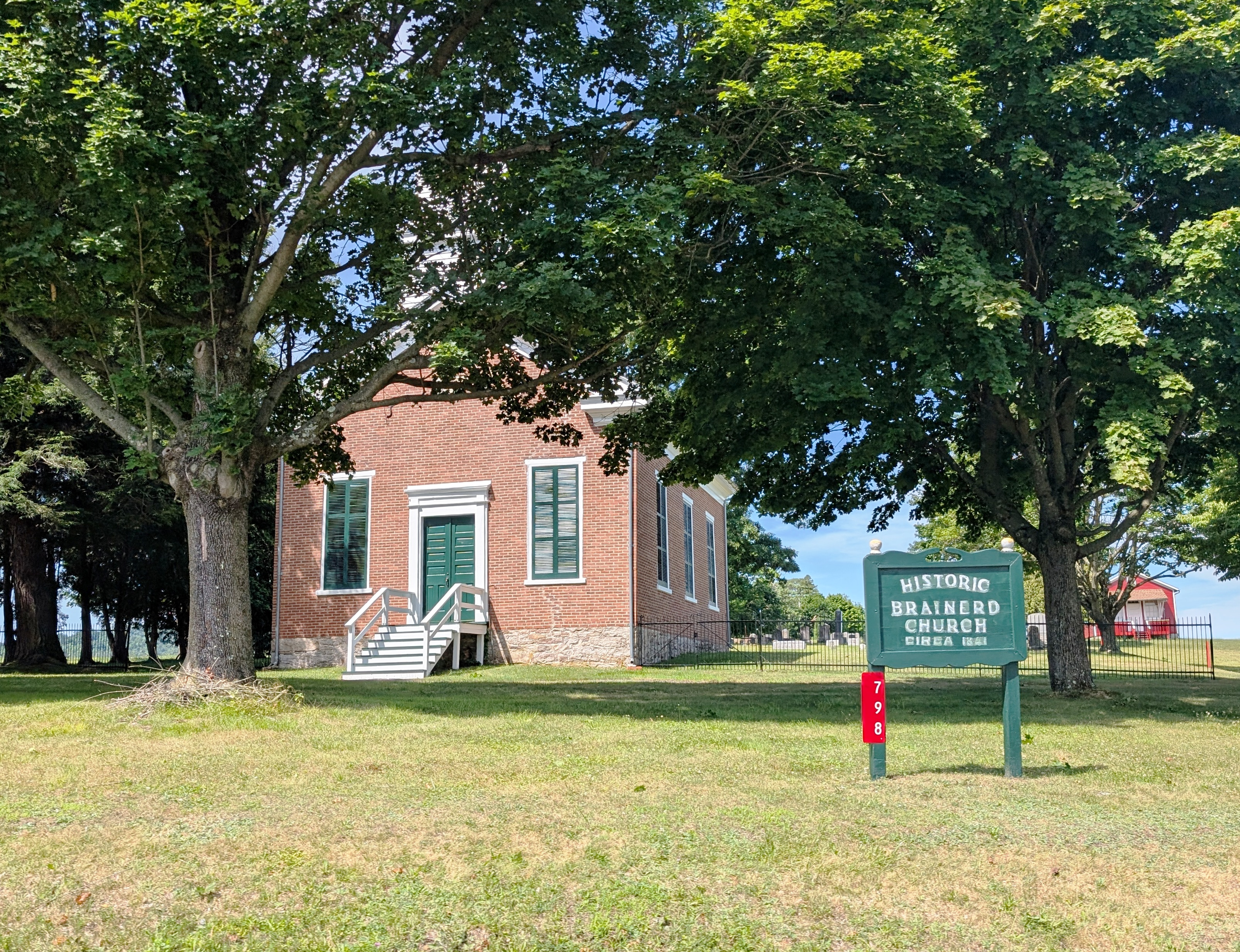
- Brainerd Church near the center of the village

- Location within Pennsylvania Location within the United States
- Coordinates: 41°00′05″N 76°04′35″W
- Country: United States
- State: Pennsylvania
- County: Luzerne
- Township: Sugarloaf
- Elevation: 768 ft (234 m)
- Time zone: UTC-5 (Eastern Standard Time)
  - Summer (DST): UTC-4 (Eastern Daylight Time)
- ZIP Code: 18249
- Area code: 570

Sybertsville is a community in Sugarloaf Township, Luzerne County, Pennsylvania, United States. It is one mile northwest of Conyngham and six miles west-northwest of Hazleton.

Nescopeck Creek runs west through the area into the Susquehanna River. Route 93 passes through the community. It uses the Sugarloaf zip code of 18251.

== Sites ==
- The Holy Dormition Byzantine Franciscan Friary is located in the town.

== Notable person ==
- Stephen Decatur Engle, born in Sybertsville in 1837
