= Tomhicken, Pennsylvania =

Unincorporated community in Pennsylvania, US

- Unincorporated community
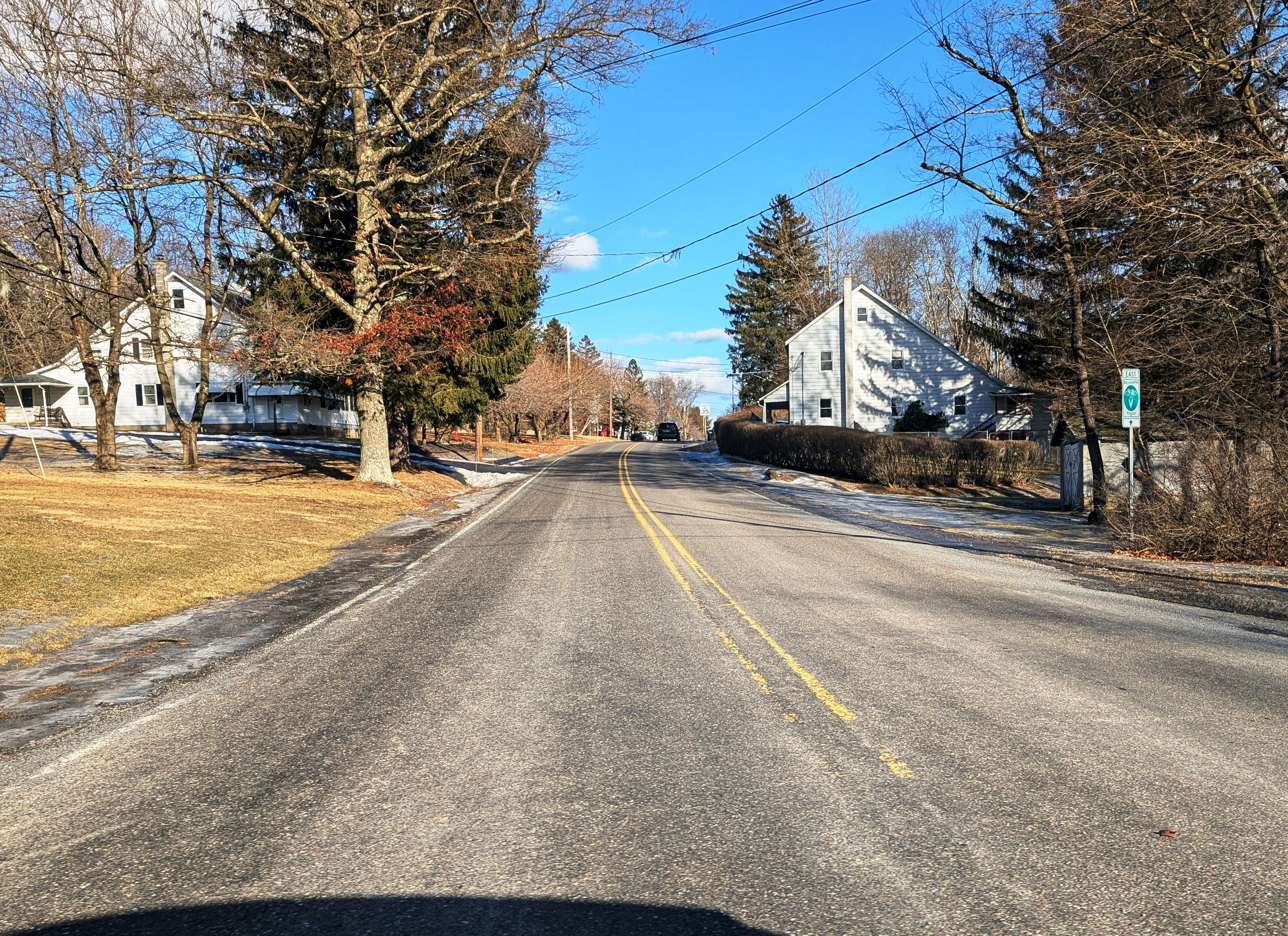
- Tomhicken Road eastbound

- Location within Pennsylvania Location within the United States
- Coordinates: 40°58′07″N 76°05′37″W
- Country: United States
- State: Pennsylvania
- County: Luzerne
- Township: Sugarloaf
- Elevation: 1,350 ft (410 m)
- Time zone: UTC-5 (Eastern (EST))
  - Summer (DST): UTC-4 (EDT)
- Area code: 570

Tomhicken (also Tomhickon) is an unincorporated community in Sugarloaf Township, Luzerne County, Pennsylvania, United States. Tomhicken is notable for being a junction point between the Lehigh Valley Railroad's Tomhicken Branch and the Pennsylvania Railroad's Catawissa Branch. Tomhicken is part of the Greater Hazleton region.
