= Stephen Decatur Engle =

American clockmaker (1837–1921)

- Born: December 18, 1837; Sugarloaf Township, Pennsylvania
- Died: January 24, 1921 (aged 83); Hazleton, Pennsylvania
- Occupation: Inventor
- Known for: The Engle Clock
- Spouse: Martha A. Grenawalt
- Parent(s): William Engle; Mary Davis

Stephen Decatur Engle (December 18, 1837 – January 24, 1921) of Sybertsville, Pennsylvania was an American inventor best known as the creator of the Engle Monumental Clock, a clockwork described at the time as The 8th Wonder of The World.
