= Sugarloaf Township, Luzerne County, Pennsylvania =

Township in Pennsylvania, US

Coordinates: 41°01′00″N 76°07′35″W

- Township
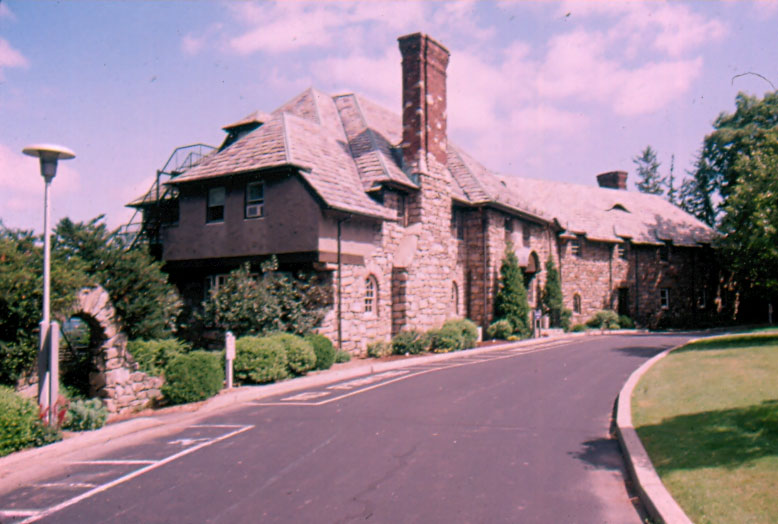
- "Highacres" (now Penn State Hazleton), built in 1924

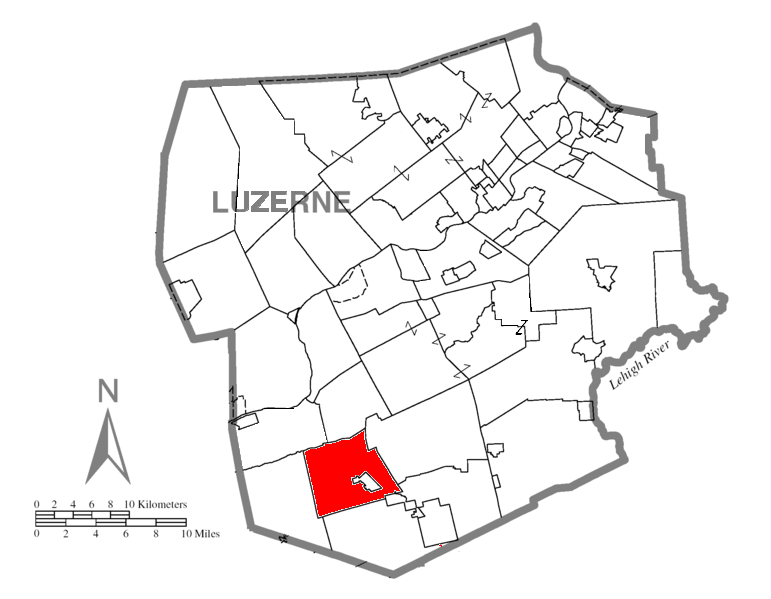
- Map of Luzerne County highlighting Sugarloaf Township

- Map of Pennsylvania highlighting Luzerne County
- Country: United States
- State: Pennsylvania
- County: Luzerne

Area
  - Total: 22.47 sq mi (58.20 km^{2})
  - Land: 22.46 sq mi (58.16 km^{2})
  - Water: 0.015 sq mi (0.04 km^{2})

Population (2020)
  - Total: 3,879 ▼
  - Estimate (2021): 3,885
  - Density: 180.6/sq mi (69.74/km^{2})
- Time zone: UTC-5 (Eastern (EST))
  - Summer (DST): UTC-4 (EDT)
- ZIP code: 18249
- Area codes: 570 and 272
- FIPS code: 42-079-75064
- Website: Official website

Sugarloaf Township is a township that is located in Luzerne County, Pennsylvania, United States. The population was 3,879 at the time of the 2020 census.

== History ==
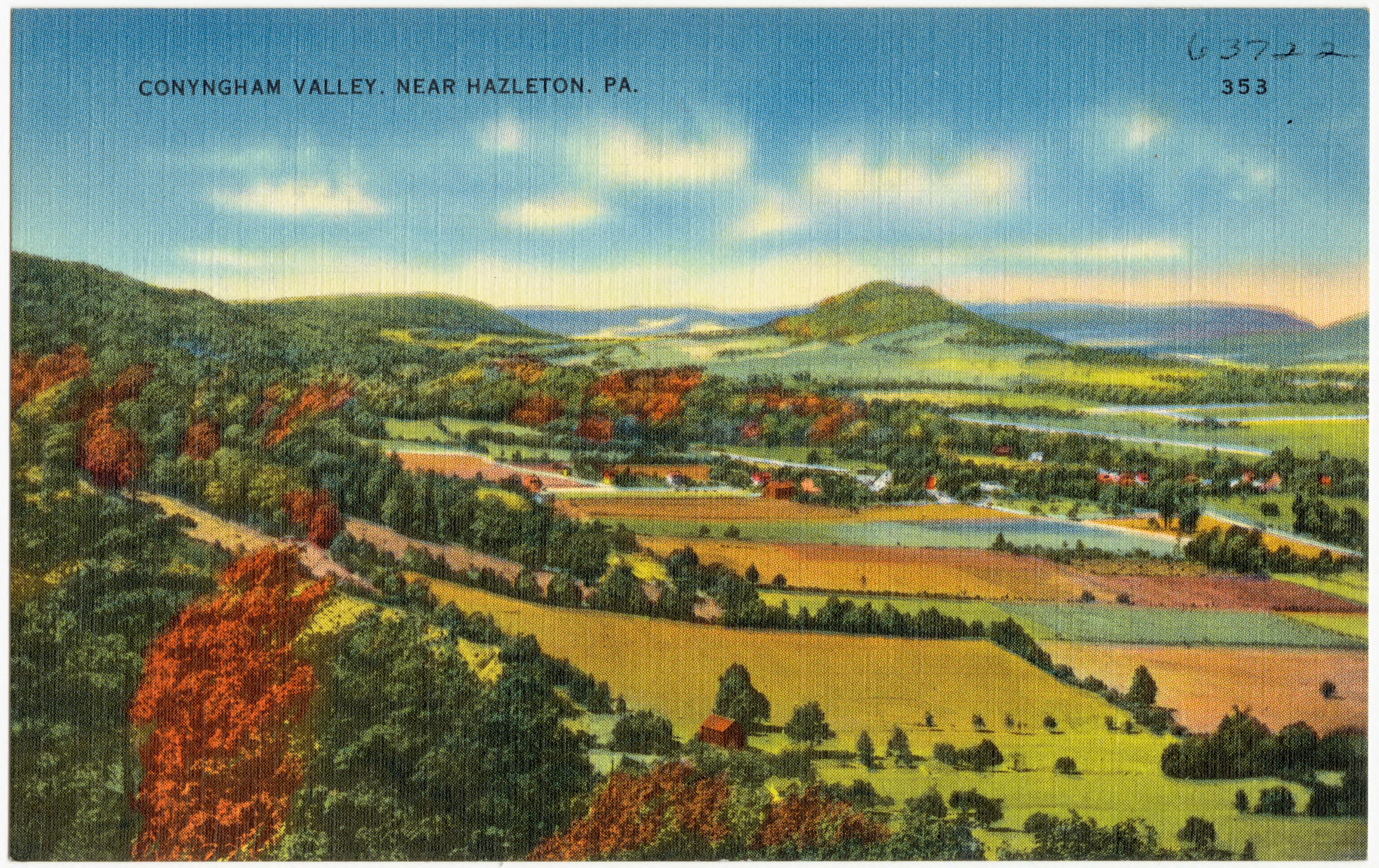
Illustration of Sugarloaf Township, Conyngham Valley, Luzerne County, between ca. 1930 and 1945

Present-day Sugarloaf Township was initially part of Newport Township (one of the original townships of Connecticut in Northeastern Pennsylvania). The first colonists established settlements close to the Susquehanna River and the territory that is now the Conyngham Valley remained virtually unchartered for quite some time.

The world first heard of the Conyngham Valley after the Sugarloaf massacre of 1780 in which roughly ten Americans were killed by a group of Native Americans and perhaps a handful of loyalists. After the skirmish, burial parties arrived in the valley to bury the slain soldiers. Settlers were attracted to the region from the stories they heard from those who visited the valley.

It is believed that George Easterday was the first white settler in what is now Sugarloaf Township. Additional colonists followed in Easterday's footsteps; they were mostly from Northampton County. In 1792, Nescopeck Township was formed from a section of Newport Township. Sugarloaf Township was finally formed in 1809 from a portion of Nescopeck; it was named after Sugarloaf Mountain (a cone-shaped mountain in the valley). Sugarloaf originally included what is now Black Creek, Hazle, and Butler Townships.

John Cawley built the first sawmill on Nescopeck Creek in 1810. The first gristmills were erected between 1815 and 1820 by Benjamin and George Koening. Stephen Yost built the first steam mill in 1865.

== Geography ==
According to the United States Census Bureau, the township has a total area of 22.5 square miles (58.2 km^{2}), of which 22.5 square miles (58.2 km^{2}) is land and 0.07% is water. The township is drained by the Susquehanna River. The municipality is in Luzerne County's Conyngham Valley.

Nescopeck Mountain forms its natural northern boundary, while Buck and Butler Mountains form its southern border. Most of the township is farmland.

Its unincorporated communities include Black Ridge, Council Crest, Sybertsville, and Tomhicken. PA 93 serves the township and interchanges with I-80 in the northern half of the municipality. I-81 crosses the southeastern corner of Sugarloaf, where it interchanges with PA 93 in Black Ridge.

=== Education ===
Sugarloaf Township is part of Hazleton Area School District. Hazleton Area operates public schools, including the Valley Elementary-Middle School in Sugarloaf Township. Penn State Hazleton is located in the southeastern corner of the township (near Black Ridge).

=== Neighboring municipalities ===
- West Hazleton (south)
- Hazle Township (south)
- Black Creek Township (west)
- Nescopeck Township (northwest)
- Hollenback Township (north)
- Butler Township (east)

Sugarloaf Township encircles Conyngham Borough.

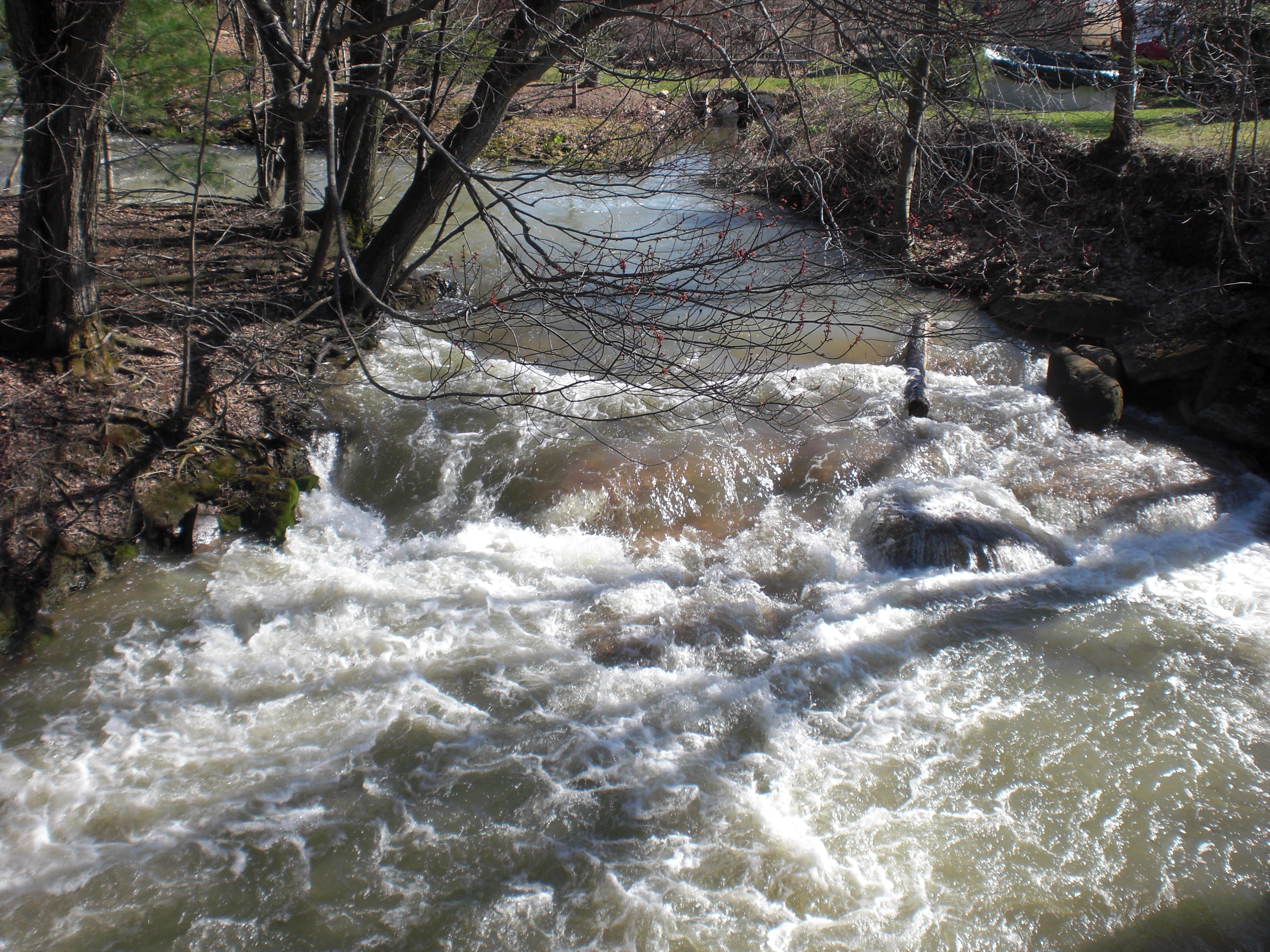
Little Nescopeck Creek in Sugarloaf

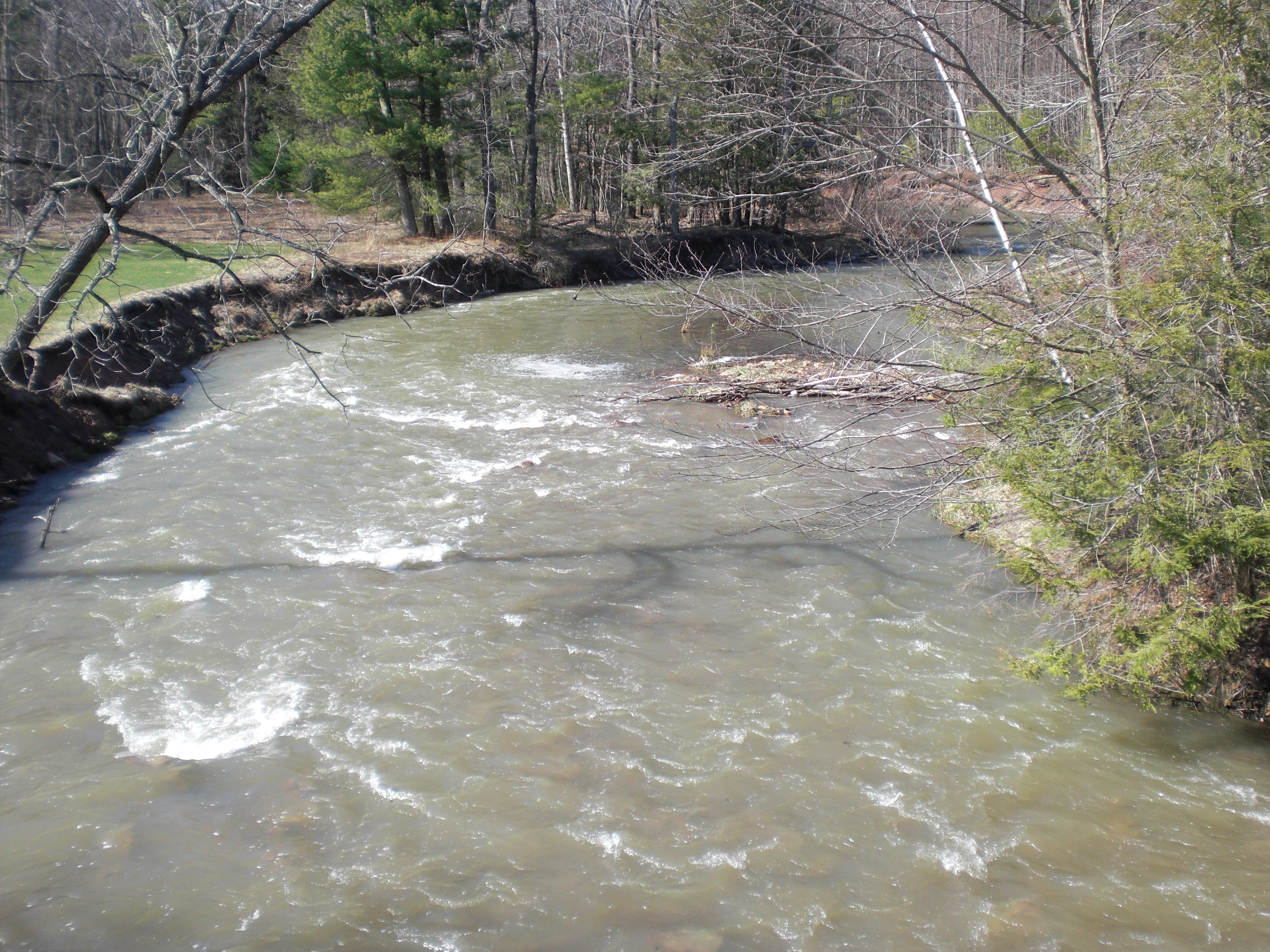
Little Nescopeck Creek in Sugarloaf

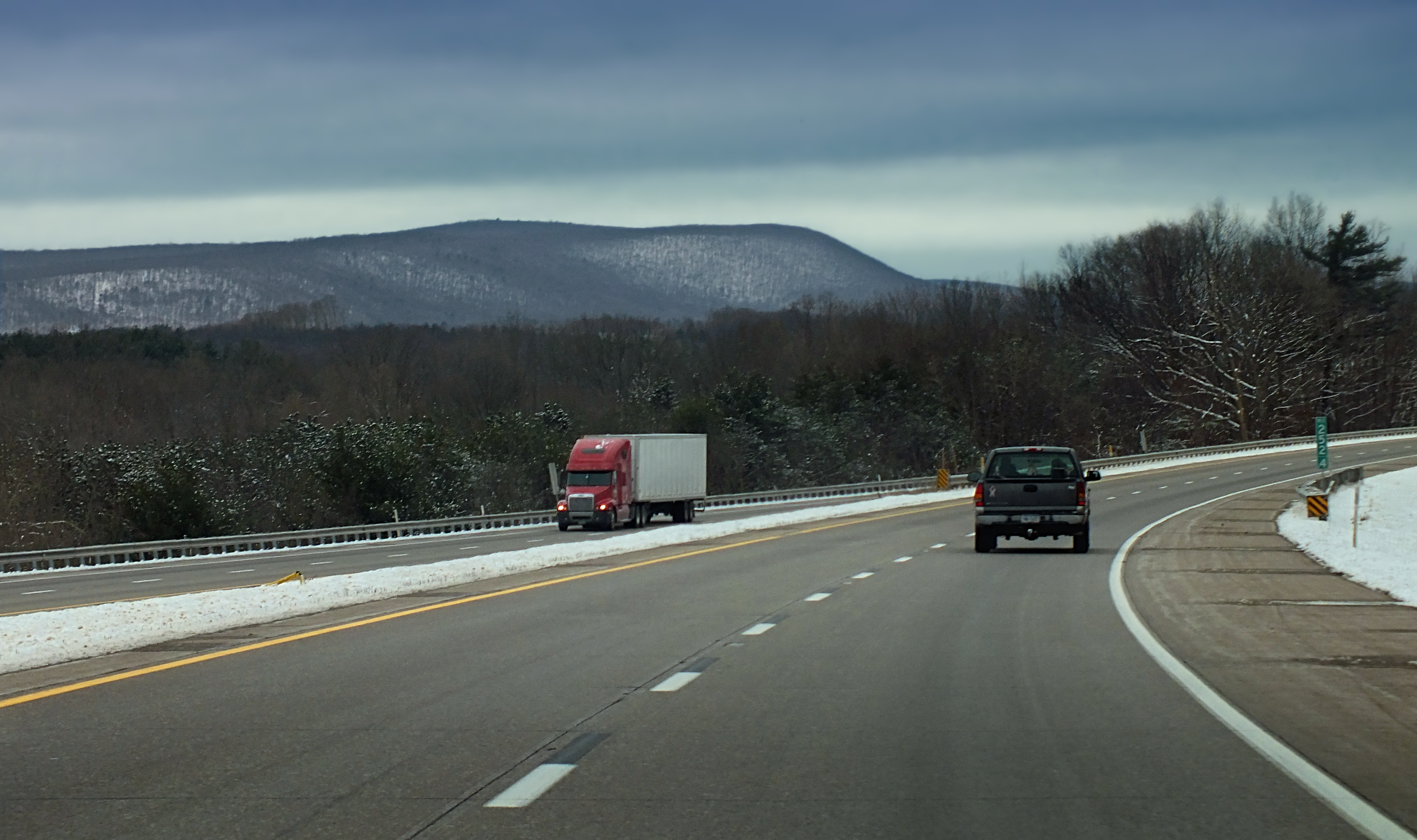
I-80 near Sugarloaf

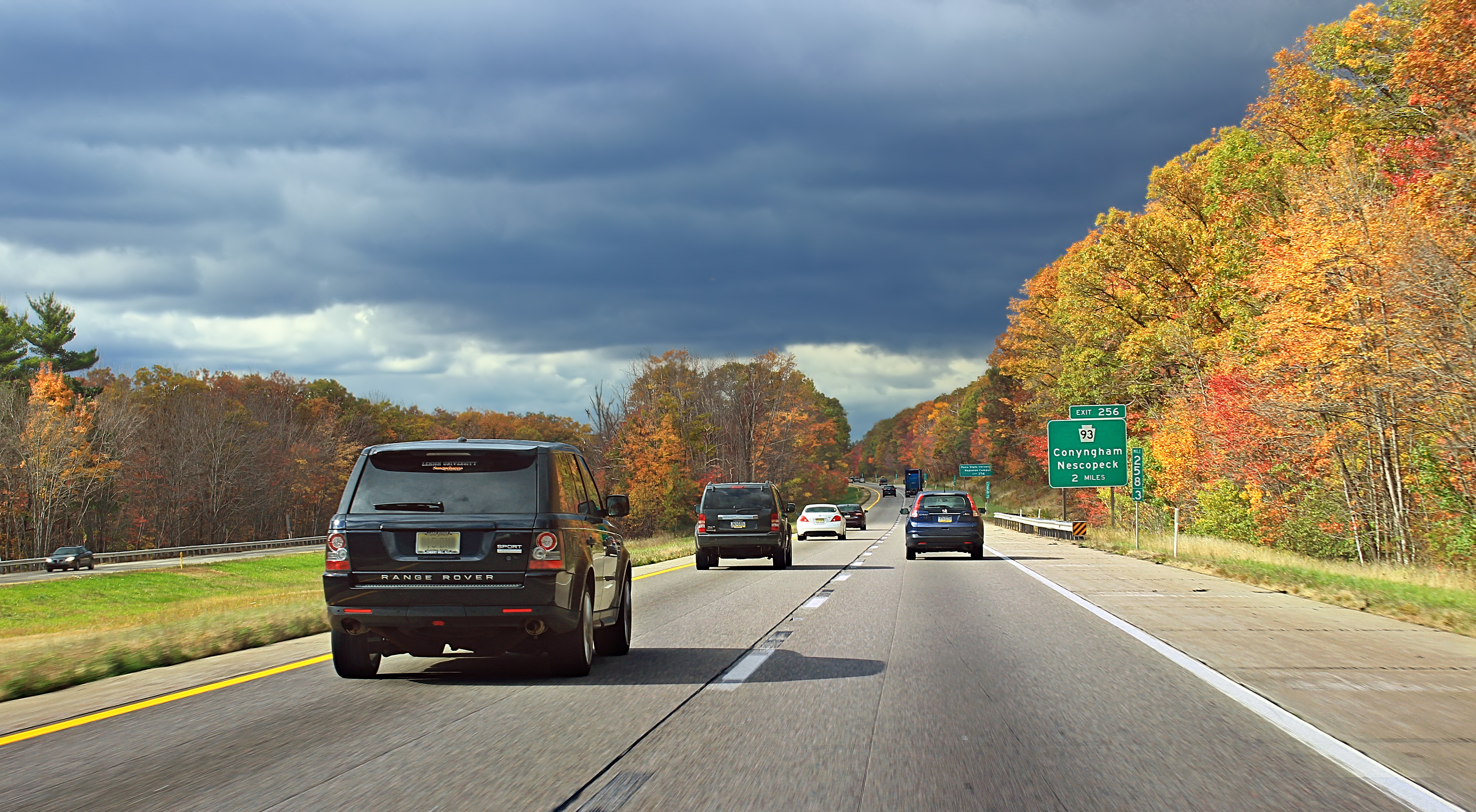
I-80 near Sugarloaf

== Demographics ==
Historical population
Census	Pop.	Note	%±
2000	3,652		—
2010	4,211		15.3%
2020	3,879		−7.9%
2021 (est.)	3,885		0.2%
U.S. Decennial Census

As of the census of 2000, there were 3,652 people, 1,222 households, and 944 families residing in the township.

The population density was 166.6 inhabitants per square mile (64.3/km^{2}). There were 1,302 housing units at an average density of 59.4 per square mile (22.9/km^{2}).

The racial makeup of the township was 98.03% White, 0.27% African American, 0.11% Native American, 1.01% Asian, 0.22% from other races, and 0.36% from two or more races. Hispanic or Latino of any race were 0.71% of the population.

There were 1,222 households, out of which 30.4% had children under the age of 18 living with them, 67.3% were married couples living together, 6.6% had a female householder with no husband present, and 22.7% were non-families. 19.6% of all households were made up of individuals, and 10.1% had someone living alone who was 65 years of age or older.

The average household size was 2.60 and the average family size was 2.98.

Within the township, the population was spread out, with 19.9% under the age of 18, 17.3% from 18 to 24, 23.5% from 25 to 44, 25.9% from 45 to 64, and 13.3% who were 65 years of age or older. The median age was 38 years.

For every 100 females, there were 105.9 males. For every 100 females age 18 and over, there were 102.8 males.

The median income for a household in the township was $53,611, and the median income for a family was $62,256. Males had a median income of $39,911 versus $25,234 for females.

The per capita income for the township was $22,444.

Approximately 2.7% of families and 5.6% of the population were living below the poverty line, including 4.3% of those under age 18 and 13.8% of those age 65 or over.
