= MMI Preparatory School =

Location
- Freeland, Pennsylvania; United States; 41.0132°N 75.8978°W

Information
- Type: College preparatory
- Established: 1879; 147 years ago
- Founders: Eckley Brinton Coxe
- Head of school: Theresa Long
- Faculty: 27
- Gender: Co-educational
- Enrollment: 204
- Student to teacher ratio: 8:1
- Colors: Red and White
- Athletics: Basketball, Volleyball, Tennis, Golf, Cross Country, Baseball, Softball, Soccer
- Team name: Preppers, Lady Preppers
- Tuition: $15,930
- Website: www.mmiprep.org

MMI Preparatory School (simply referred to as MMI) is an independent, non-sectarian, co-educational 6-12 college preparatory day school in Freeland, Pennsylvania, United States. MMI is short for Mining and Mechanical Institute and was founded in 1879 as the Industrial School for Miners and Mechanics by Eckley Brinton Coxe to provide technical training for area miners. The program was modeled after the "Steigerschulen" of Germany. Mr. Coxe examined The "Steigerschulen", which were secondary technical institutes, while studying mining engineering in that country. The first class consisted of 11 students. The present day name of MMI Preparatory School came to be in the 1970s as young women were accepted into the school and to more accurately reflect the school's function of preparing students for the rigors of college academics.

== History ==
On May 7, 1879 Eckley B. Coxe, the son of a prominent Philadelphia judge and the owner of a large mining area, opened his own school - the Industrial School for Miners and Mechanics. Twenty-nine male applicants, ranging in age from 12 to 24 walked into a small two-story building in Drifton, PA, seeking an education. Eighteen were rejected due to the school's high standards. Of the 11 who were accepted, eight successfully completed their first year. The first instructor was O.J. Heinrich. He was succeeded by John R. Wagner, who also managed the school until 1893 when Coxe selected a Board of Directors to manage the school.

=== Early Curriculum ===
At the time, classes were held two hours a night, six nights a week. When the mines were closed, students met for six hours a day. They studied spelling, reading, writing, grammar, composition, algebra, bookkeeping, geometry, trigonometry, mechanical drawing, physics, chemistry, mineralogy, drafting, mining, and other courses. The curriculum was designed to produce intelligent foremen, not engineers. Coxe often had to go to Europe for the technical training he needed, and he wished to make it available in the United States.

=== Remodeling ===
In 1888, a fire completely destroyed the Drifton school. The school reopened, now called the Miners and Mechanics' Institute of Freeland, Pennsylvania, on March 16, 1893. It was located on the third floor of a building on Centre St in Freeland. Within five weeks, the board of directors decided to lease eight more rooms in another building to accommodate increasing enrollment. It was at this meeting that the name of the school was changed yet again, to the Mining and Mechanical Institute of Freeland.

Coxe delivered the Founder's Day Address on May 31, 1893. The school was incorporated in Luzerne County Court on July 31, 1894. Coxe began offering scholarships for the school's best students. The school began offering day classes in 1893.

=== Growth ===
Enrollment at MMI continued to grow, and in December 1902, the front wing of the new school was built where MMI stands today. It was largely funded through contributions from Eckley Coxe's wife, Sophia Georgianna Coxe. Classes started in the new wing in the spring of 1903.

In 1914, Mrs. Coxe funded the construction of the rear wing of the existing building, which housed the chemistry and physics laboratories. She also funded the construction of the gymnasium across the street in 1925. She continued to help subsidize student tuition costs.

=== Effects of Political Upheaval ===
During the Great Depression, night school enrollments dropped off. The night school briefly reopened between 1940 and 1950, but after World War II, it was closed again for lack of enrollment.

=== Fire of 1964 ===
In 1946, the front and rear wing were joined by an addition. In 1964, the main building was gutted by fire. On June 9, hours before graduation, smoke was seen coming out of the tower. By 3:00 P.M., the tower had fallen and burned. The roof caved in. The interior of the front wing was completely destroyed, but the rear wing and all school records (dating back to 1893) were saved. During the commencement exercises, the board of directors promptly announced the school would be rebuilt. On October 30, the newly restored building was dedicated.

=== Acceptance of Women ===
In 1970, the school began accepting young women. The name of the school was changed to MMI Preparatory School because officials felt that the old name did not adequately describe the school's function or mission, which was to prepare students for the rigors of college academics.

=== Basketball Championship ===
The Preppers 1973 boys' basketball squad won a state basketball championship, the first and only independent school to do so. John the "Animal" Sisock was part of this team. John later coached for the school.

=== Expansions ===
In 1977, MMI expanded its curriculum by adding a 7th and 8th grade (Mid-School) to the Preparatory School. The Century II Building, containing the cafetorium, computerized library, science labs, and modern classrooms, opened in 1979.

In 1996, the school spent a quarter-million dollars on a new computer lab, which a state computer consultant termed "one of the most rich and full-featured networks in the state." The project was largely funded through alumni contributions and outside donations.

For the first time in its 120-year history, MMI Preparatory School opened its doors to sixth grade students at the start of the 1999-2000 school year. The first class had 20 students and was taught by Mrs. Maria Greco.

In 1999, work began on a $4.6 million expansion project that added a new Science/Technology wing and a new Athletic and Drama Complex. The Old Main Building was also remodeled at this time. The building project was funded through a bond issue secured through the Hazleton Industrial Development Authority, as well as private donations. This project marked the largest, single private investment made in the local area at that time.

In 2009, MMI announced its plans to build a $3 million privately funded sports complex on 29.5 acres (11.9 ha) of undeveloped land in Foster Township. The complex, which consists of high school regulation-size baseball, softball and soccer grass turf fields as well as several nature trails that also serve as cross country courses, was completed in 2011, and was used for sports games beginning in the 2011-2012 school year.

In 2011, the school began construction on a new library open to students and the public after school hours. The new building, officially named the Joseph A. Turri Library and Learning Center, was funded in large part by MMI Class of 1945 graduate Joseph A. Turri. After its groundbreaking in December 2011, many local legislative officials visited the library construction site, including Pennsylvania State Representative Tara Toohil and Pennsylvania State Senator John Yudichak. The library's design was greatly inspired by the Linderman Library at Lehigh University and features cathedral ceilings, pillars and a fireplace.

== Curriculum ==
Every core course offered at MMI holds the Honors distinction, demonstrating the coursework is in-depth and comprehensive. In addition, MMI offers multiple Advanced Placement courses designed to prepare students for college-level classes. Students are also offered a wide variety of electives to choose from, distributed across every core subject.

== Athletics ==
MMI is a member of the Wyoming Valley Conference of Northeastern Pennsylvania. Though MMI is better known for the academic performance of its students than for their athletic performances, the 1973 MMI boys' basketball team became the first and only private school in Pennsylvania to win a state championship. Despite this, the school is well equipped with a tennis court, basketball court and volleyball court. A new sports complex completed in 2011 offers a full soccer field, baseball field, softball field, and cross-country trail that also serves as a public nature trail.
