= Eckley Brinton Coxe =

American politician (1839–1895)

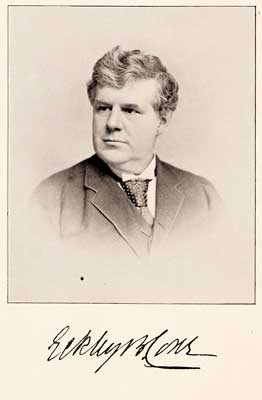

Member of the Pennsylvania Senate for the 21st district
- In office 1881–1884
- Preceded by: Elijah Catlin Wadhams
- Succeeded by: Morgan B. Williams

Personal details
- Born: June 4, 1839 Philadelphia, Pennsylvania, U.S.
- Died: May 13, 1895 (aged 55) Drifton, Pennsylvania, U.S.
- Party: Democratic
- Education: University of Pennsylvania

Eckley Brinton Coxe (June 4, 1839 – May 13, 1895) was an American mining engineer, coal baron, inventor, industrialist, state senator, and philanthropist from Pennsylvania. He was a co-founder of the Coxe Brothers and Company coal mining operation, which became one of the largest independent producers of anthracite coal in the United States. Through his mining, railroad, manufacturing, and landholding interests, Coxe became one of the most influential coal operators in the Pennsylvania anthracite region during the late nineteenth century. As a leading anthracite coal operator, Coxe was a prominent opponent of organized labor and played a significant role in defeating union efforts during the prolonged anthracite strike of 1887–1888.

Coxe was instrumental in the formation of Lehigh University in Bethlehem, Pennsylvania, which began as a mining school in 1865, and founded the Institute of Miners and Mechanics in 1879. He served as president of the American Institute of Mining Engineers from 1878 to 1880 and of the American Society of Mechanical Engineers from 1893 to 1894. He was granted more than 100 patents related to mining and industrial technology.

He served as a Democratic member of the Pennsylvania State Senate for the 21st district from 1881 to 1884.

== Early life and education ==
Coxe was born June 4, 1839, in Philadelphia, Pennsylvania, to Charles Sidney Coxe and Anna Maria Brinton. His great-great-grandfather was Daniel Coxe, his grandfather was Tench Coxe, a prominent political economist and landowner, and his cousin was George B. McClellan. Through inheritance and family ownership, the Coxe family retained extensive coal-bearing lands in northeastern Pennsylvania that later formed the basis of the Coxe coal enterprises.

Coxe graduated from the University of Pennsylvania in 1858 with degrees in Chemistry and Physics. He spent six months after graduation in the Lehigh Valley region of Pennsylvania conducting a topographical geology survey of his grandfather's 35,000-acre estate under the supervision of Benjamin Smith Lyman. The survey documented portions of the coal-bearing lands that would later become central to the family's mining operations.

In 1860, he traveled to Europe and studied for two years at the École des Mines in Paris, France, and for one year at the Freiberg Mining Academy in Freiberg, Saxony. He spent an additional two years studying mines in England and continental Europe and returned to the United States in 1864. His extensive European mining education provided technical expertise that would later be applied to the development and management of the family's anthracite coal interests.

== Career ==
Eckley's grandfather, Tench Coxe, had purchased 800,000 acres of land in Pennsylvania and urged his heirs to hold on to the land as he suspected coal would be found in the region. Tench's son, Charles, was able to retain ownership of 35,000 acres and left it to his sons including Eckley.

Coal was found in the Coxe owned land and the Coxe Brothers and Company mining company was founded in 1865 with the first mine opened in Drifton, Pennsylvania. By the late 1800s, the company was the largest independent producer of anthracite coal with nearly 4,000 employees, coal shipments in excess of 1.5 million tons and land assets valued at $10 million.

The Coxe Brothers & Company organization became the Cross Creek Coal Company led by Coxe, and in 1890 Coxe organized and became president of the Delaware, Susquehanna and Schuylkill Railroad.

He lectured frequently before scientific bodies. He published several technical papers on mining and translated the first volume of Julius Weisbach's "Mechanics of Engineering and Construction of Machines" from German to English in 1872.

He was instrumental in the founding of Lehigh University in Bethlehem, Pennsylvania as a mining school in 1865 and served on its board of trustees until his death. In 1877, his mines were selected by the Columbia College School of Mines for their study program due to the quality of the mines. He founded the Institute for Miners and Mechanics in 1879 in Freeland, Pennsylvania. The intent of the school was to teach math, science and English to the men working in the mines.

Coxe was a staunch opponent of organized labor and played a leading role in defeating two major unions during one of the longest strikes in the anthracite coal industry, from September 1887 to March 1888. The defeat of the strike weakened miners' ability to collectively bargain for higher wages, safer working conditions, and greater protections against the power of coal operators. Labor historians have cited the conflict as an example of the immense economic and political influence exercised by coal companies during the late nineteenth century, when workers and their families often faced significant hardship during labor disputes. Critics argue that Coxe's resistance to unionization helped preserve a system in which mine owners retained overwhelming control over employment, housing, and the daily lives of mining families throughout the region.

He was a member of the American Society of Civil Engineers. He was elected as a member in 1870 to the American Philosophical Society. In 1880 Coxe was one of the original founders of the American Society of Mechanical Engineers. He served as the president of the American Institute of Mining Engineers from May 1878 to February 1880 and as vice president of the Institute of Mechanical Engineers from April 1880 to November 1881.

Critics of the anthracite coal industry have pointed to the Coxe enterprises as an example of the enormous economic influence wielded by coal operators during the Gilded Age and Progressive Era. The wealth accumulated through these enterprises stood in stark contrast to the conditions experienced by many miners and their families, whose labor generated the profits that fueled the expansion of the coal empire.

Coxe was an inventor who was granted over 100 patents. He developed a long steel tape for the measurement of land by surveyors and the traveling grate, which he patented in 1893.

He served as a Democratic member of the Pennsylvania State Senate for the 21st district from 1881 to 1884. He served as chairman of the Pennsylvania delegation to the Democratic National Convention in Chicago in 1884. Records in the Coxe Brothers collection indicate that after being elected in 1880, Coxe initially declined to take the oath of office because he stated he could not swear that all campaign funds had been spent in compliance with the requirements of Pennsylvania law at the time. He later addressed this publicly to his constituents.

He died May 13, 1895, of pneumonia and was interred at Saint James Episcopal Churchyard in Drifton, Pennsylvania.

== Legacy ==
Eckley Miners' Village in Pennsylvania was named for him in 1857 by his father.

The Coxe Hall (1910) at Lehigh University, originally a mining laboratory, is named after him.

Coxe was admitted to the National Inventors Hall of Fame in 2006 for his work on the traveling-grate furnace.

== Publications ==
- Eckley B. Coxe. "A Furnace with Automatic Stoker, Travelling Grate and Variable Blast, Intended Especially for Burning Small Anthracite Coals." Transactions of the American Institute of Mining. 1895.
- "Mechanics of Engineering: Theoretical Mechanics, with an Introduction to the Calculus", D. Van Nostrand Company, New York, 1889.

Pennsylvania State Senate
Preceded by Elijah Catlin Wadhams	Member of the Pennsylvania Senate, 21st district 1881–1884	Succeeded by Morgan B. Williams
