= List of Lehigh University buildings =

Lehigh University, located in Bethlehem, Pennsylvania, has many buildings, old and new, on its three campuses. When the university was founded in 1865, it took over several buildings from the surrounding property; one of these three buildings remains today, Christmas Hall, which is part of Christmas-Saucon Hall.

Building Codes
Code	Name
BI	Business Innovation Building
CO	Coppee Hall
CU	Chandler Ullmann Bldg
CX	Coxe Hall
DR	Drown Hall
FM	Fairchild-Martindale Lib
FR	Fritz Lab
GR	Grace Hall
IA	Iacocca Hall
IL	Imbt Laboratories
LA	Lamberton Hall
LI	Linderman Library
LL	Lewis Lab
MG	Maginnes Hall
MO	Mohler Building
MU	Mudd Building
NV	Neville Hall
PA	Packard Lab
PH	Philosophy Building
PR	Price Hall
RB	Rauch Business Center
SI	Sinclair Lab
ST	STEPS*
TA	Taylor Gym
UC	University Center
WB	Wilbur Workshop
WH	Whitaker Lab
WI	Williams Hall
XS	Christmas Saucon Hall
ZA	Zoellner Arts Center

== Asa Packer Campus ==
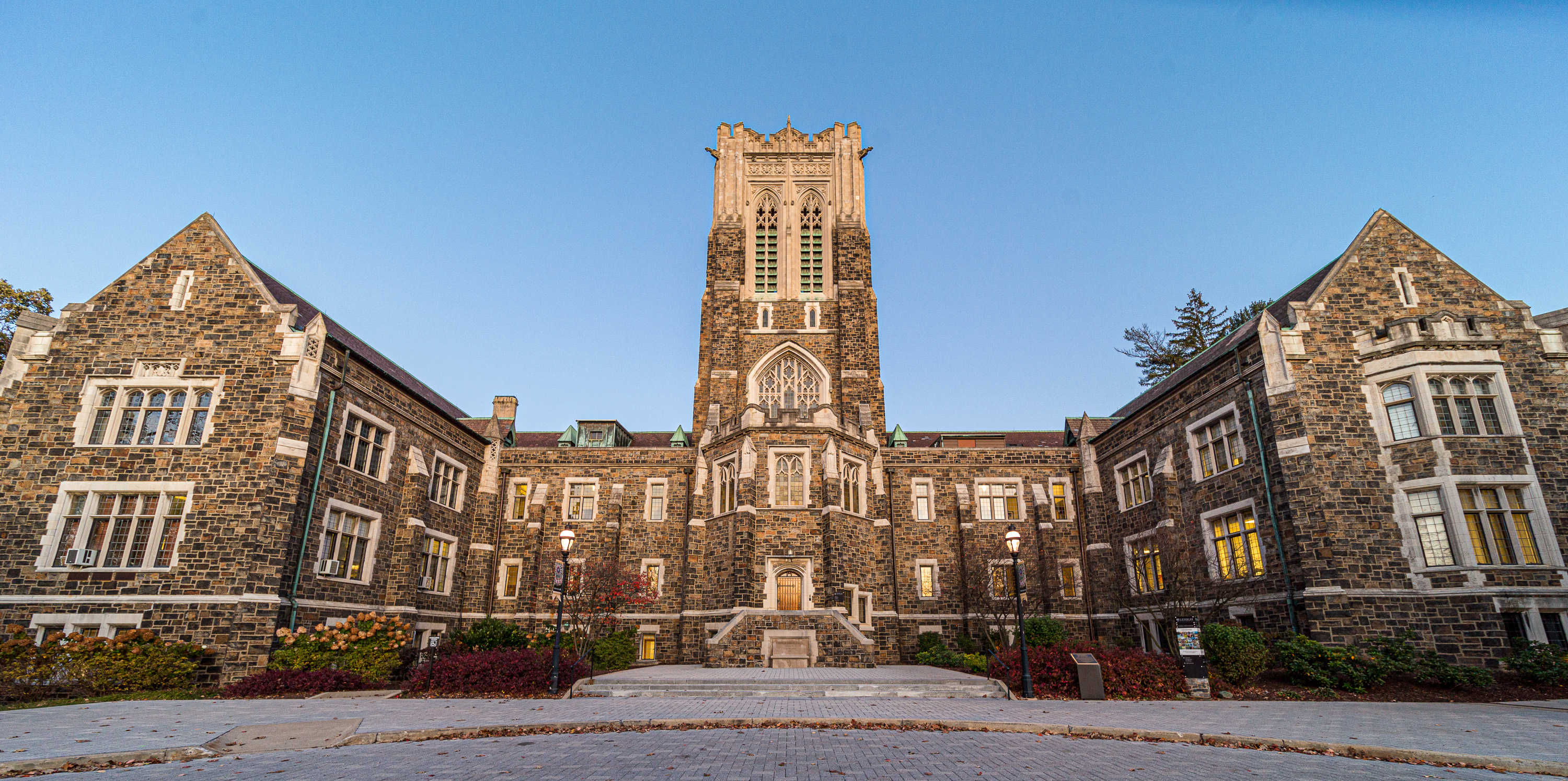
Alumni Memorial Building in November 2019

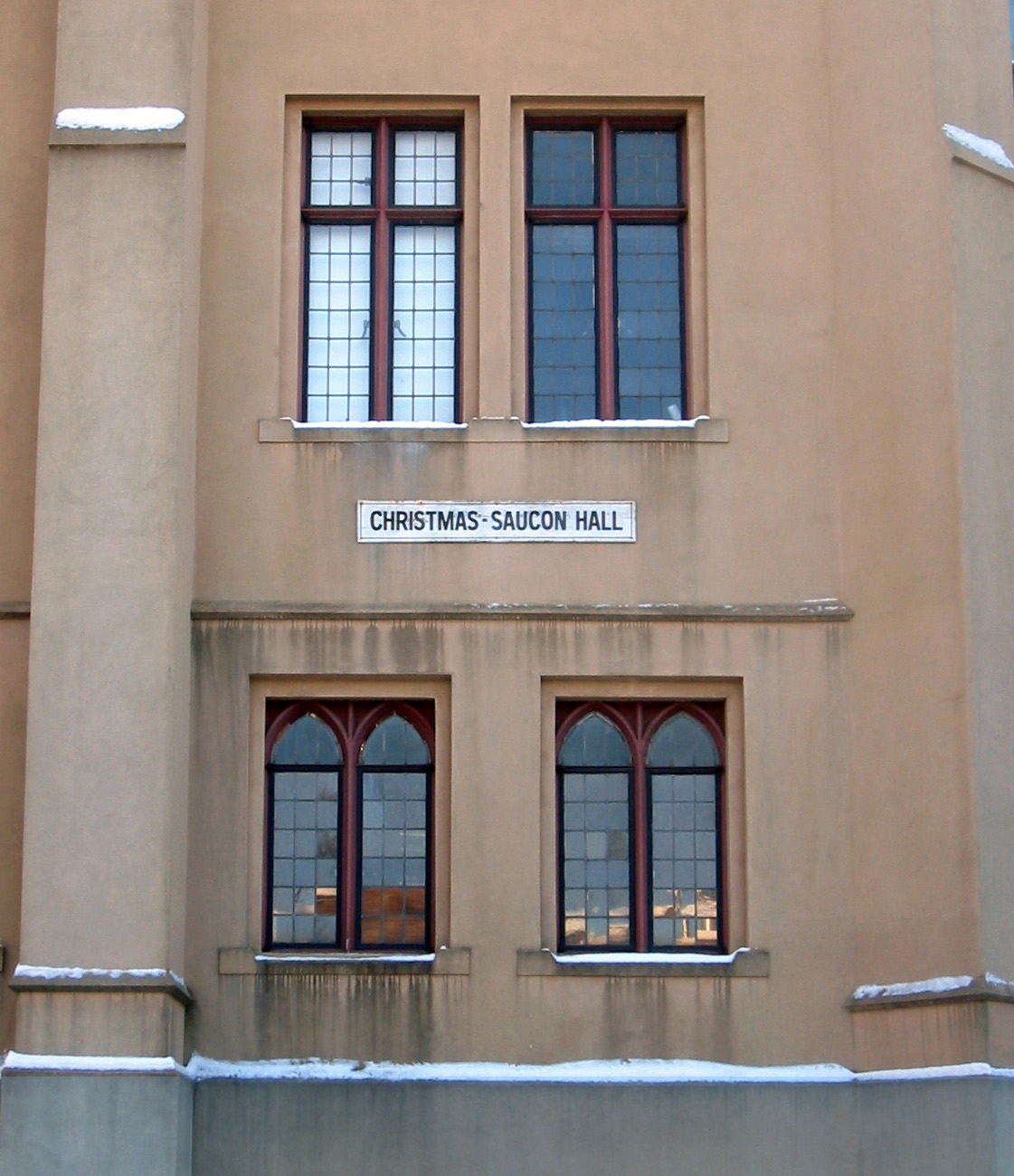
Christmas-Saucon Hall in December 2005

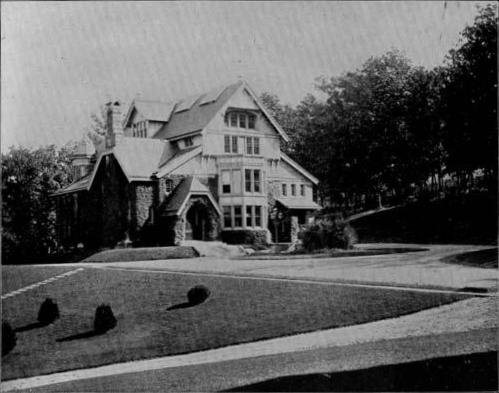
Coppee Hall, named for Lehigh's first president Henry Coppée, in 1896

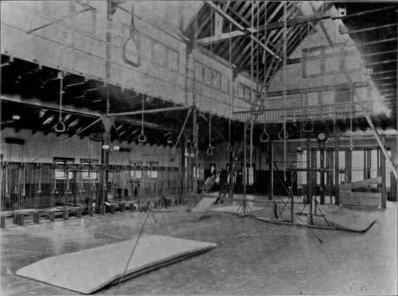
Coppee Hall's interior in 1896

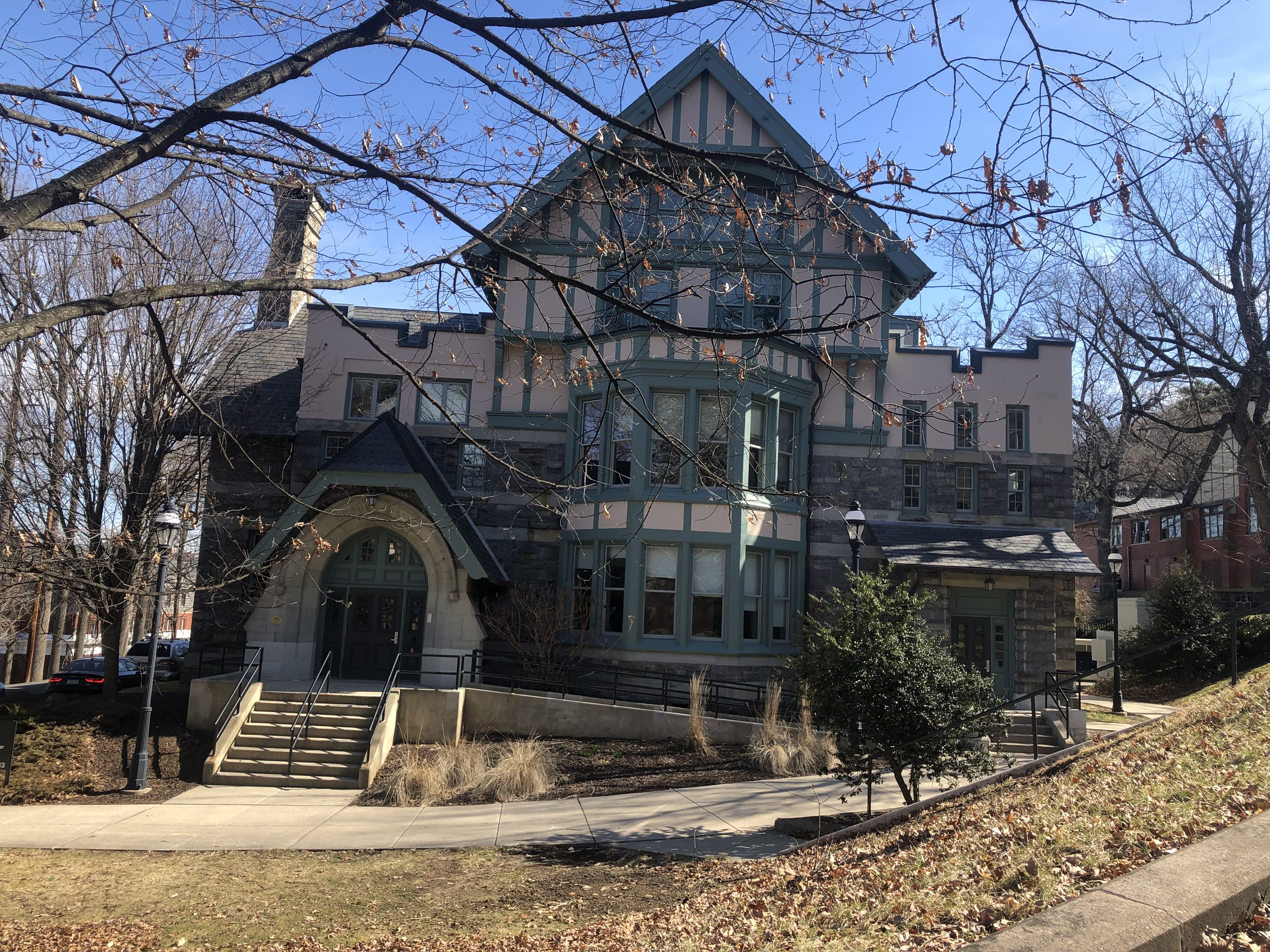
Coppee Hall's exterior in February 2023

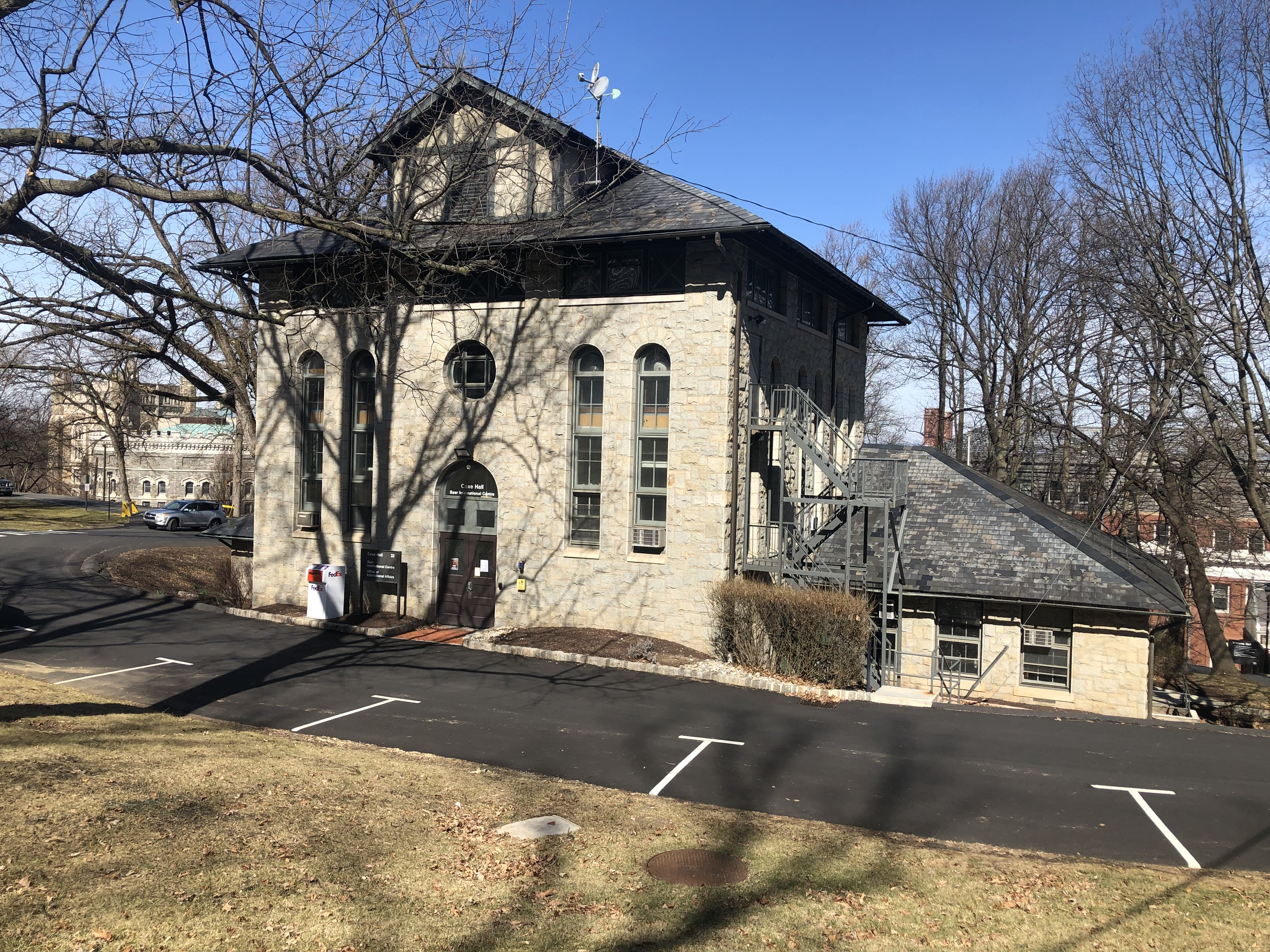
The exterior of Coxe Hall, named for Eckley Brinton Coxe, in May 2023

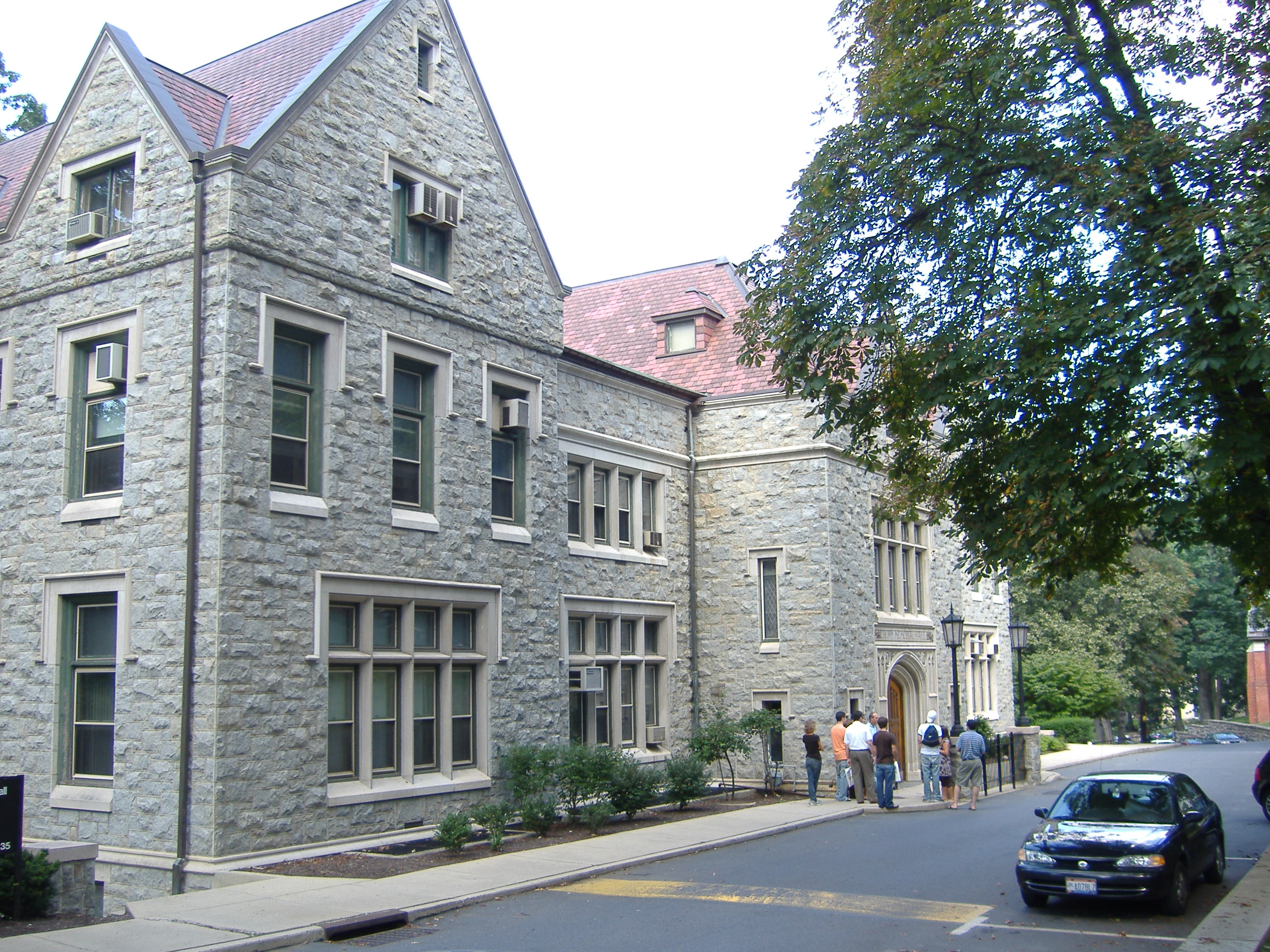
Drown Hall, named for former university president Thomas Messinger Drown

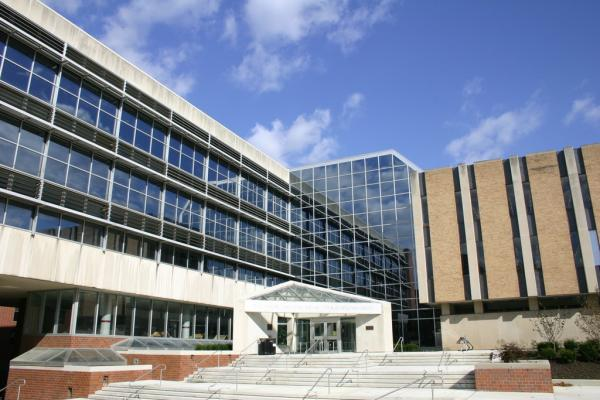
E.W. Fairchild-Martindale Library and Computing Center

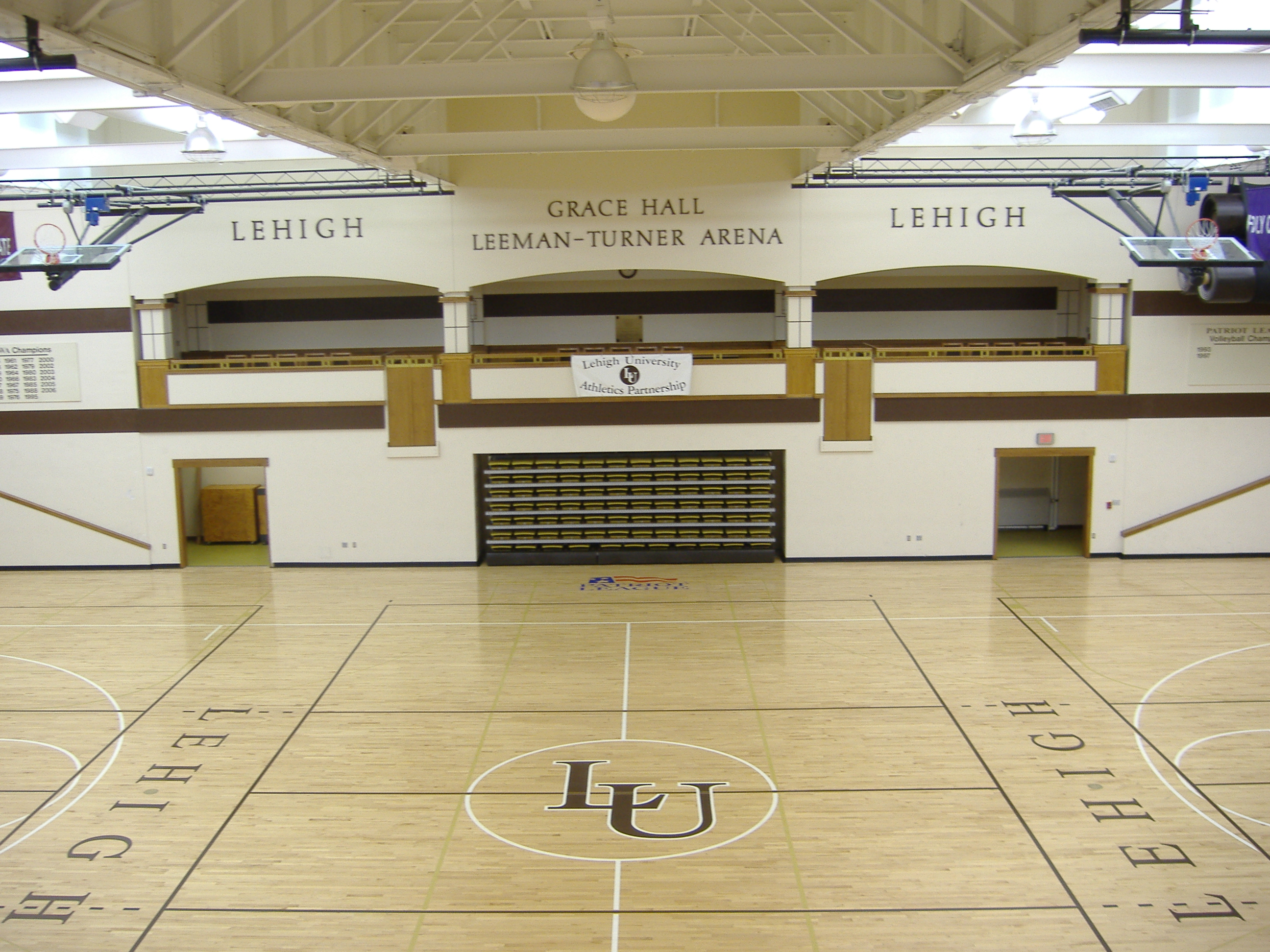
An empty Grace Hall

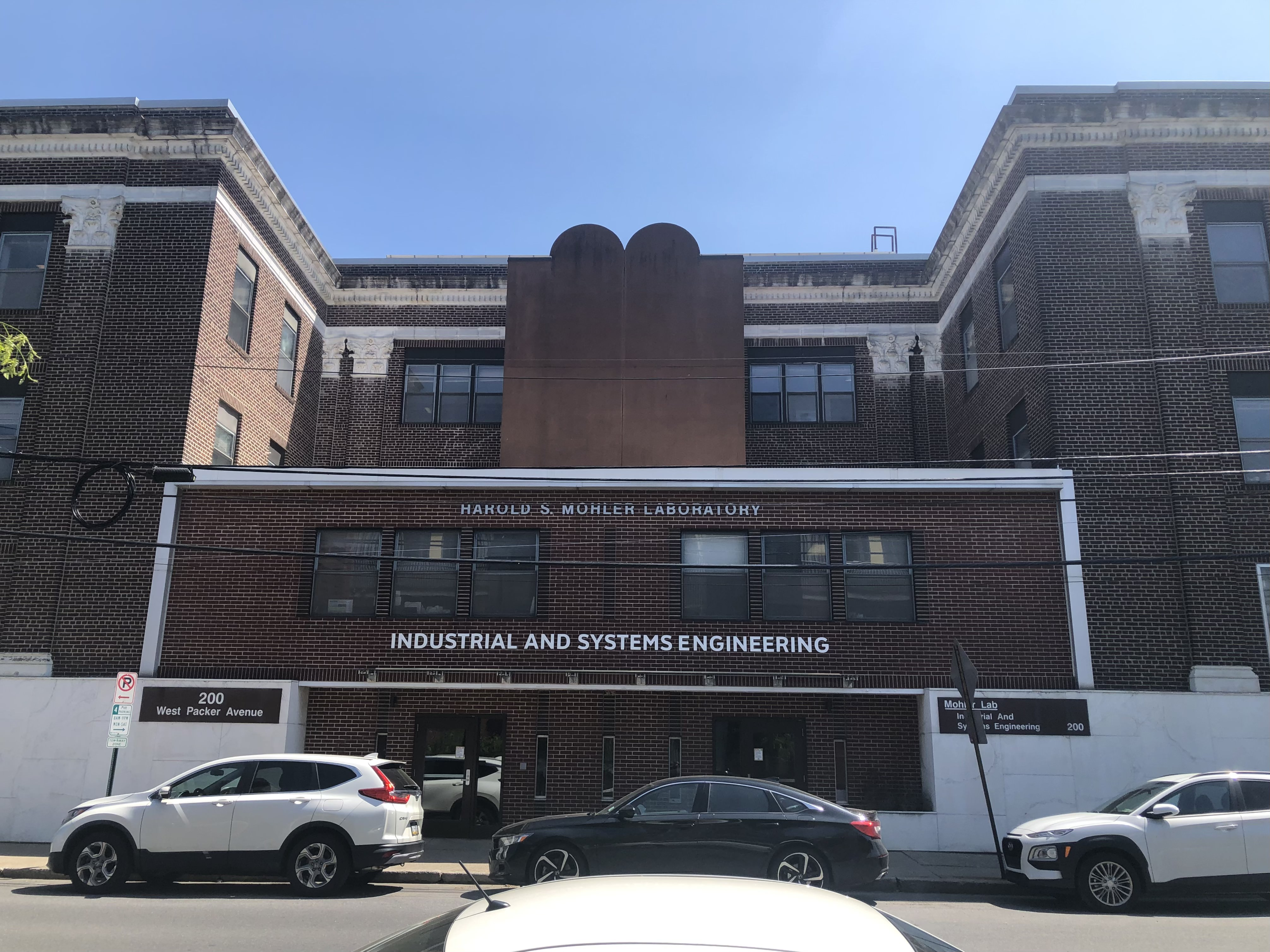
Entrance to Mohler Laboratory

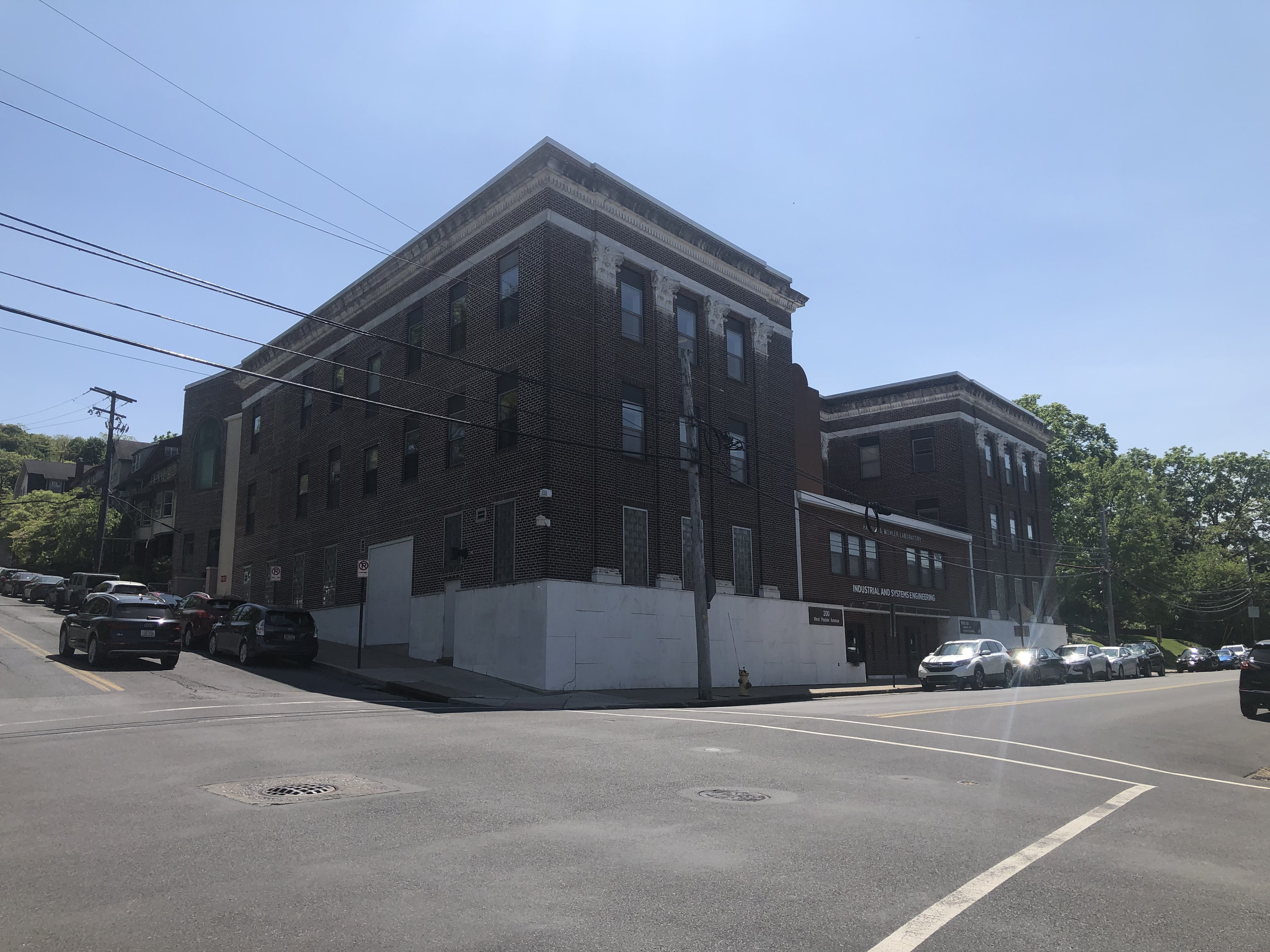
Street view of Mohler Laboratory

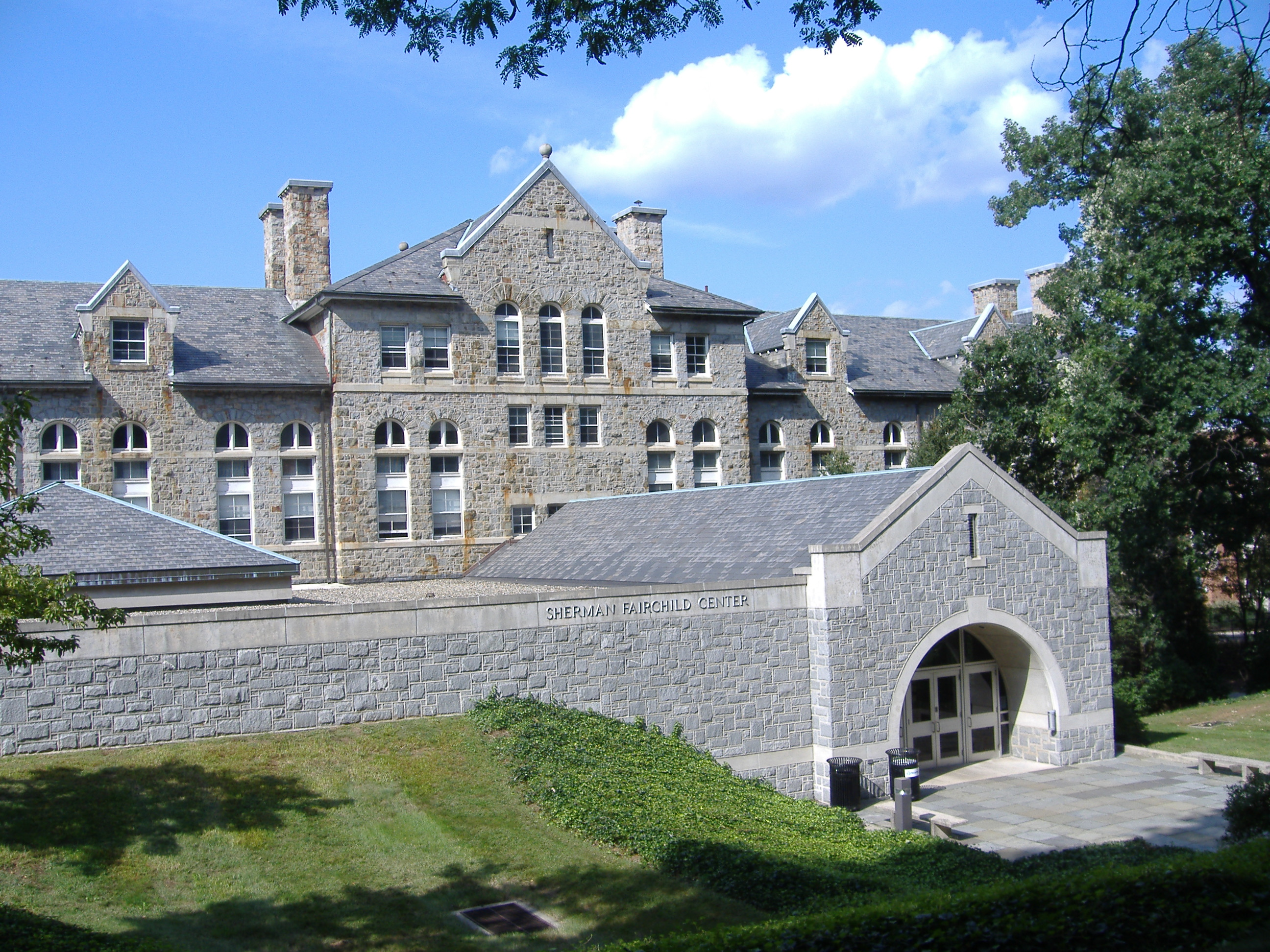
Lewis Laboratory

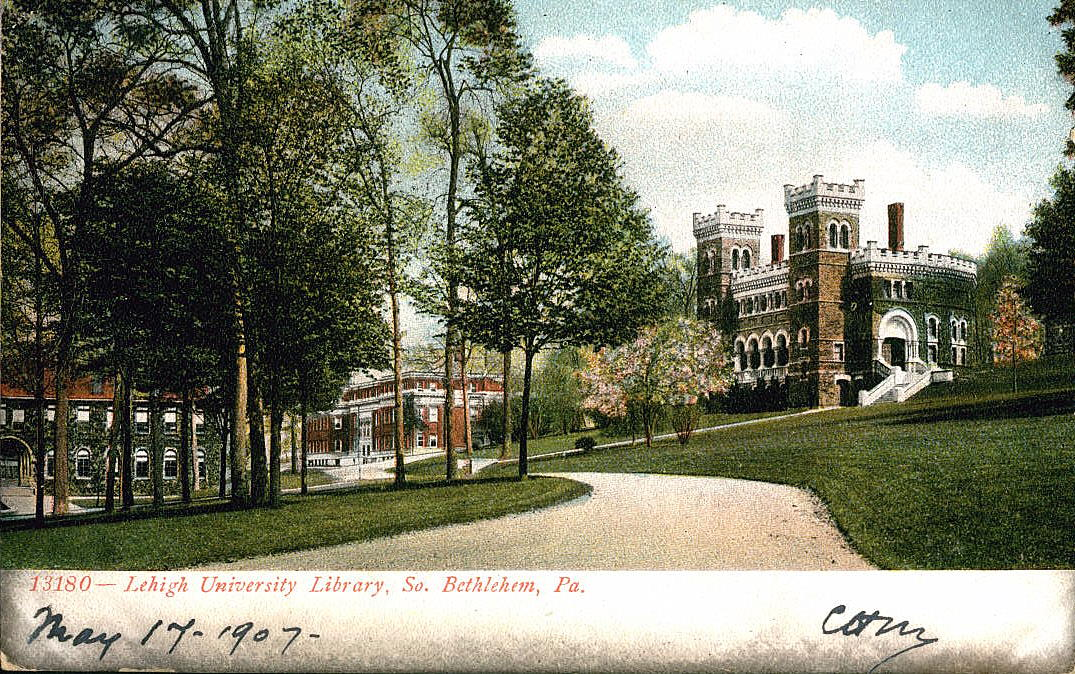
A 1907 postcard of the Linderman Library

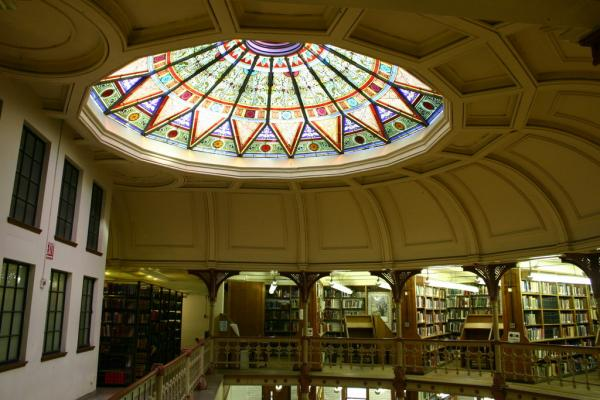
"The Rotunda" at Linderman Library prior to its renovations

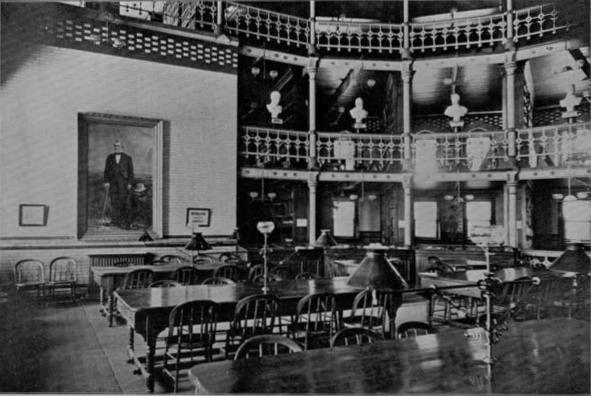
An early view of "The Rotunda" stacks and reading room

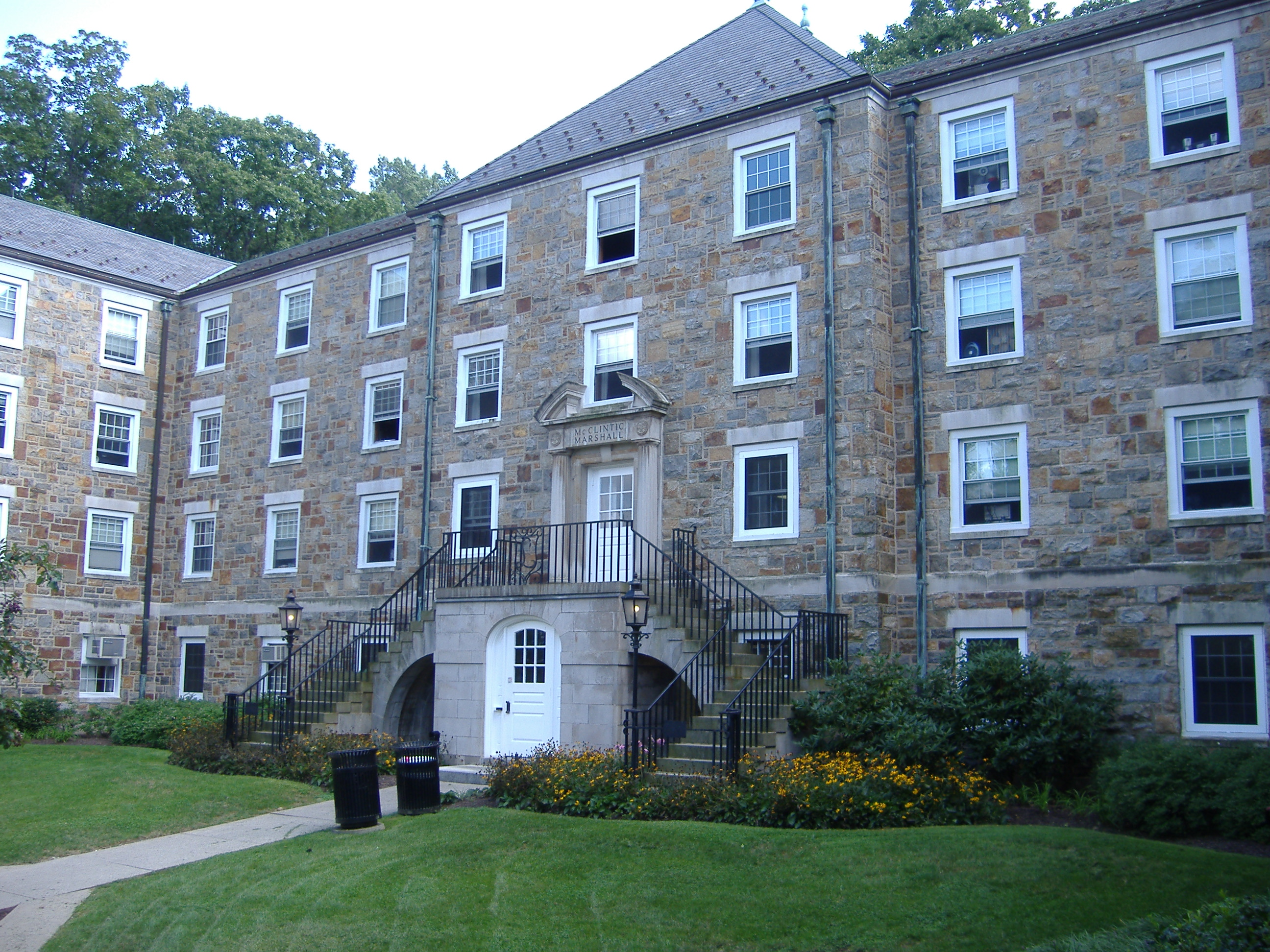
M&M

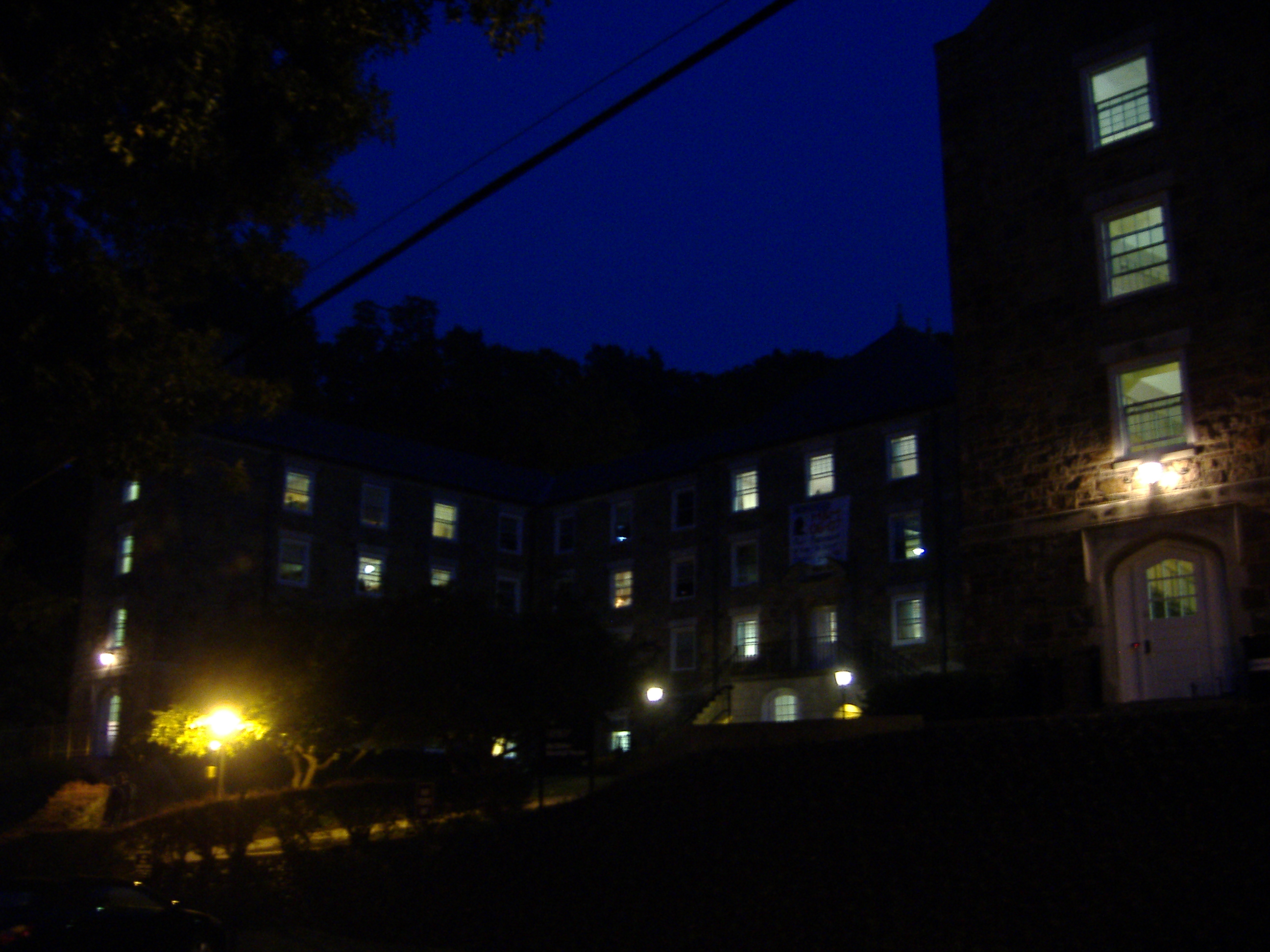
M&M at night

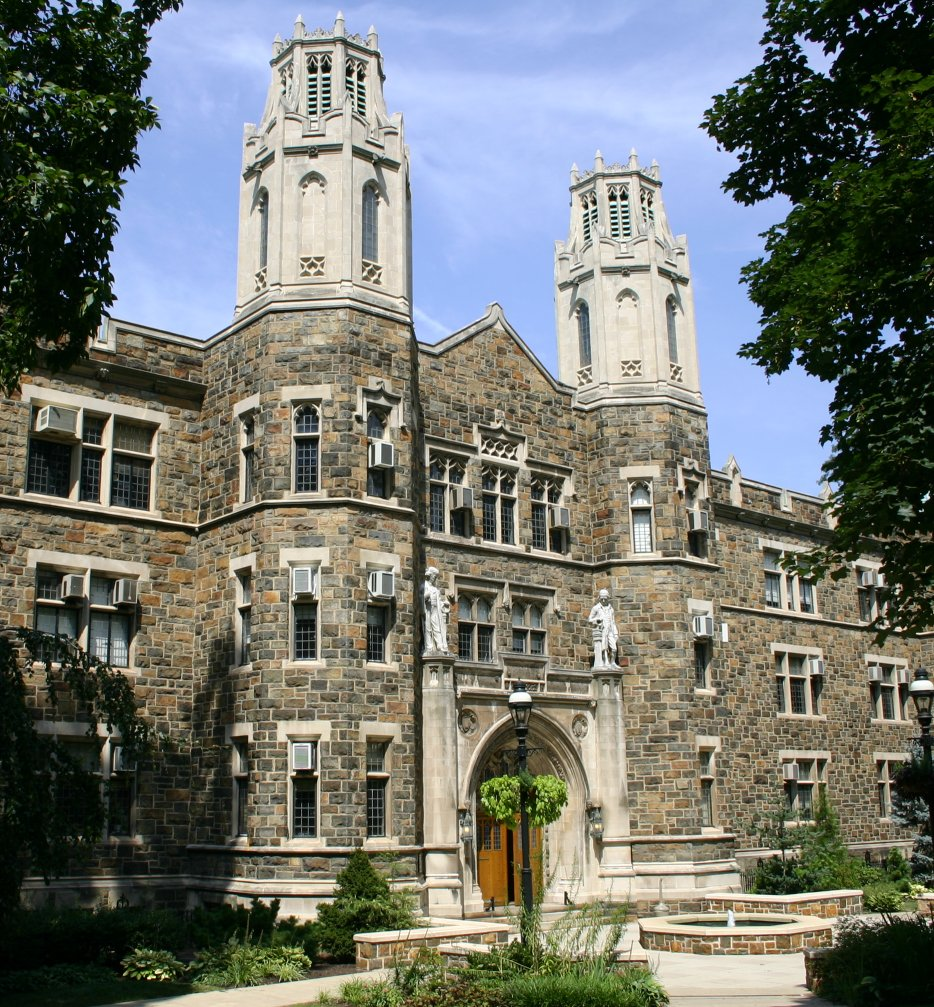
Packard Lab

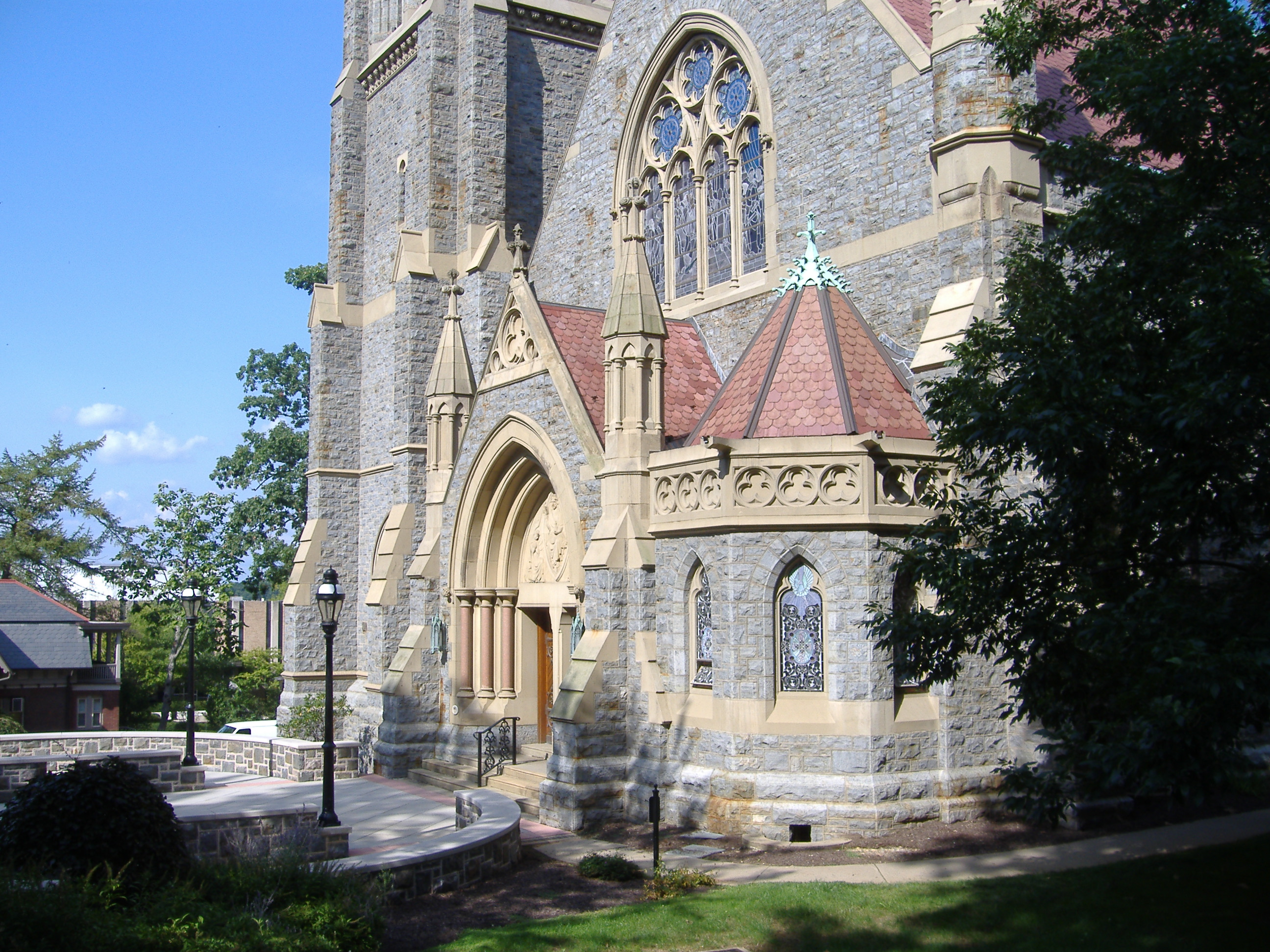
Packer Memorial Chapel's entrance

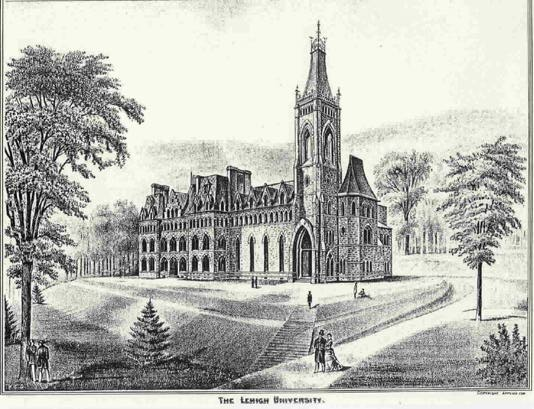
A 19th century illustration of Packer Hall

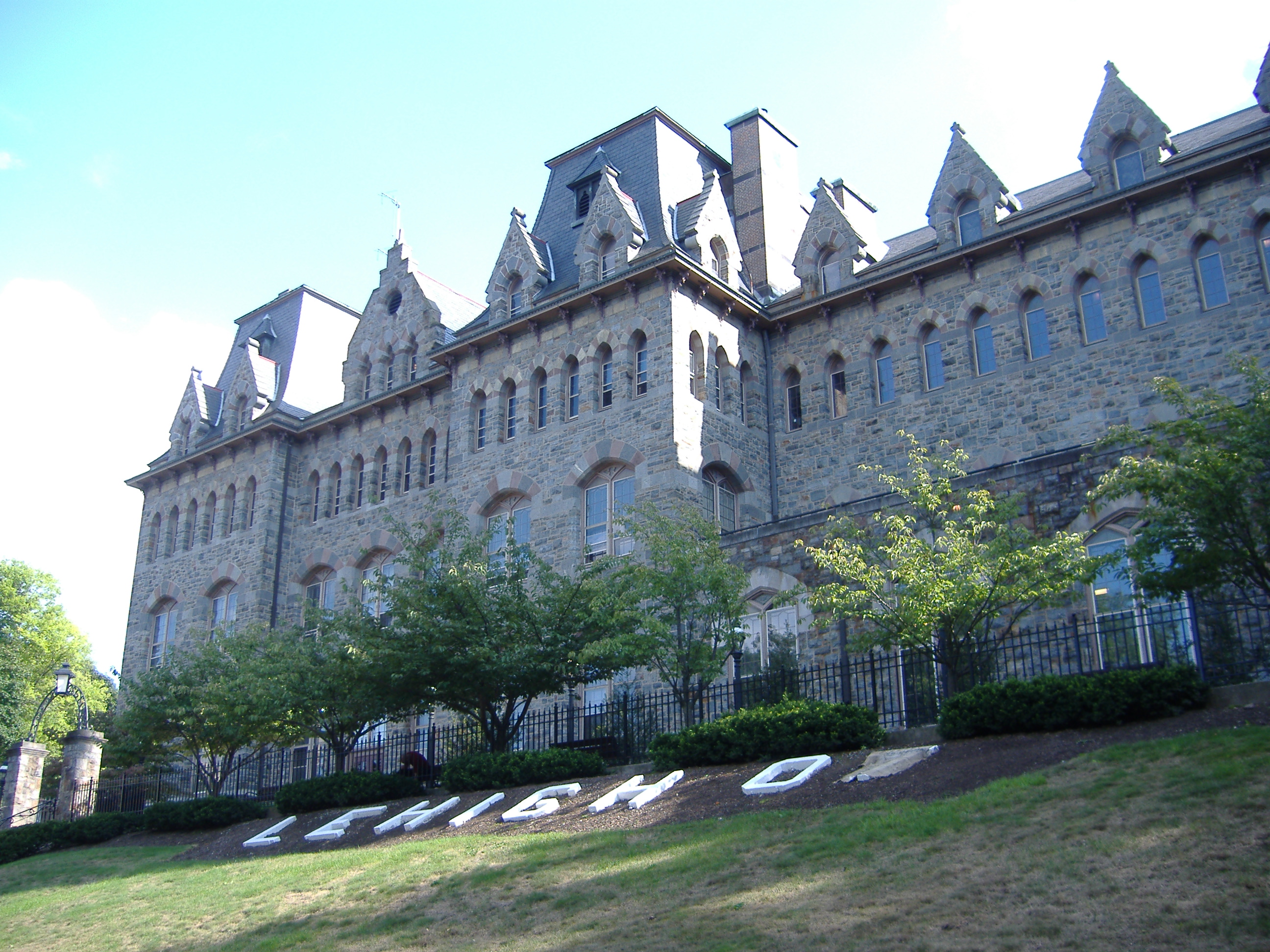
Angle of Packer Hall in late summer

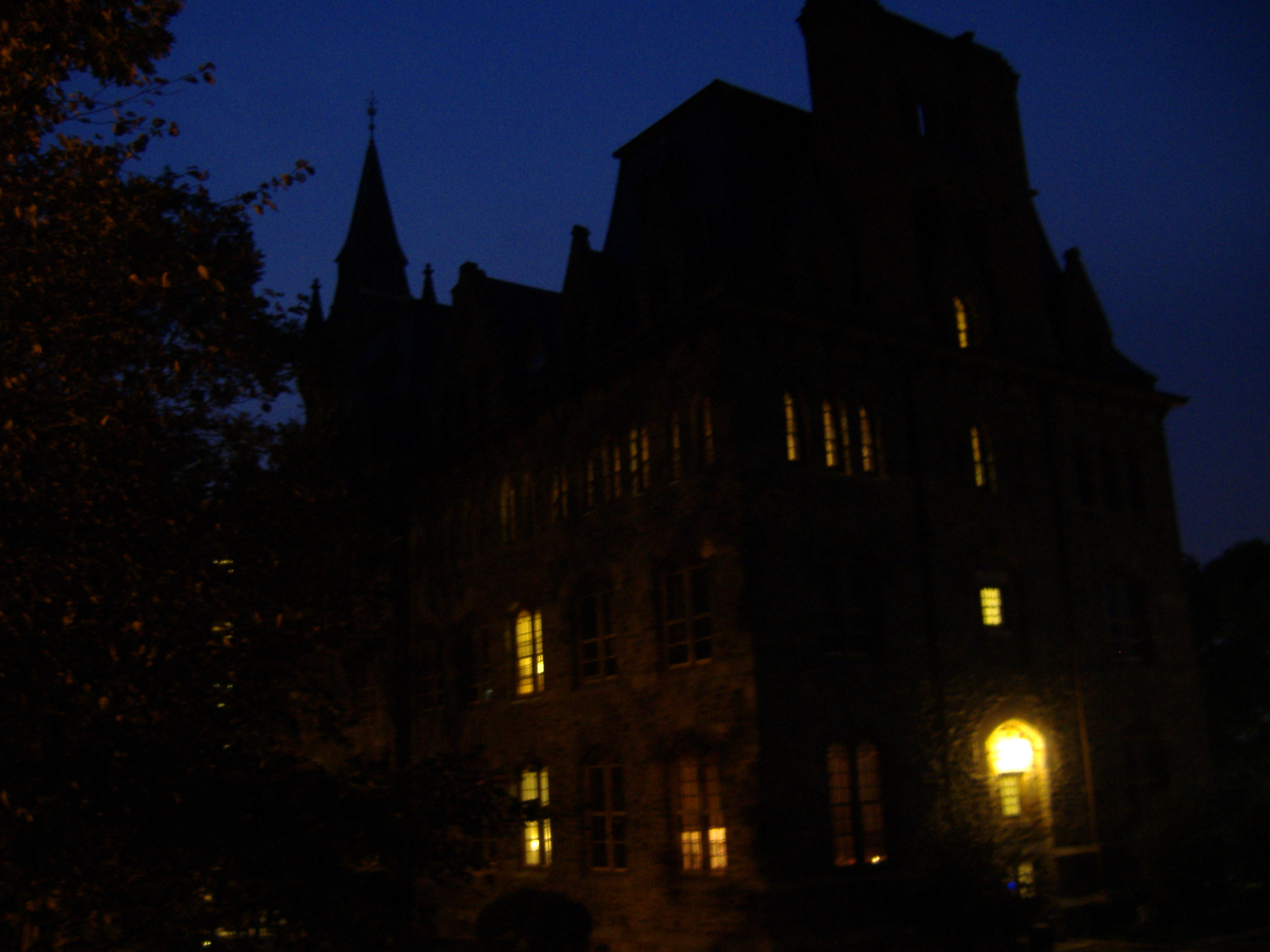
Packer Hall at night

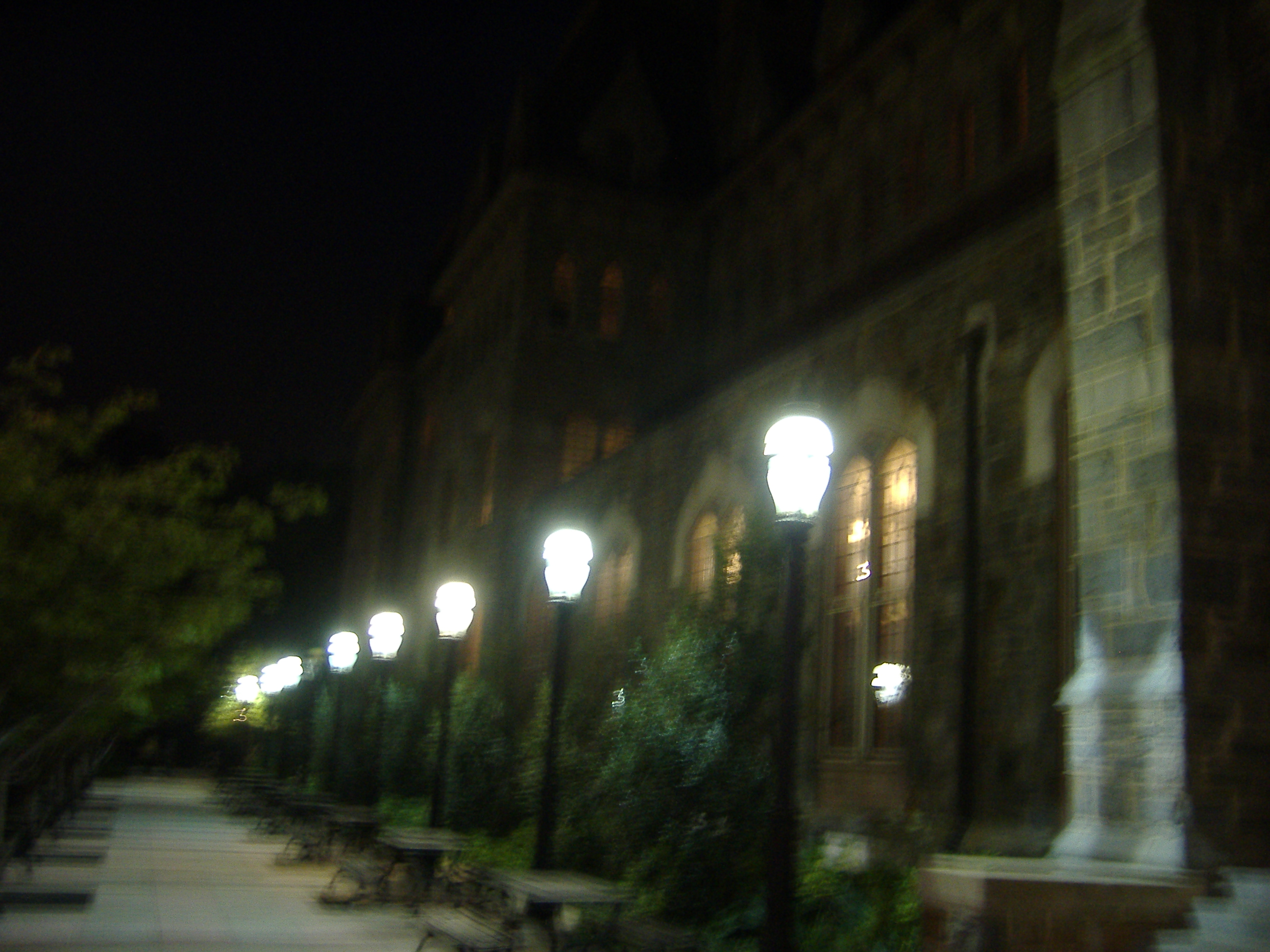
Packer Court at night

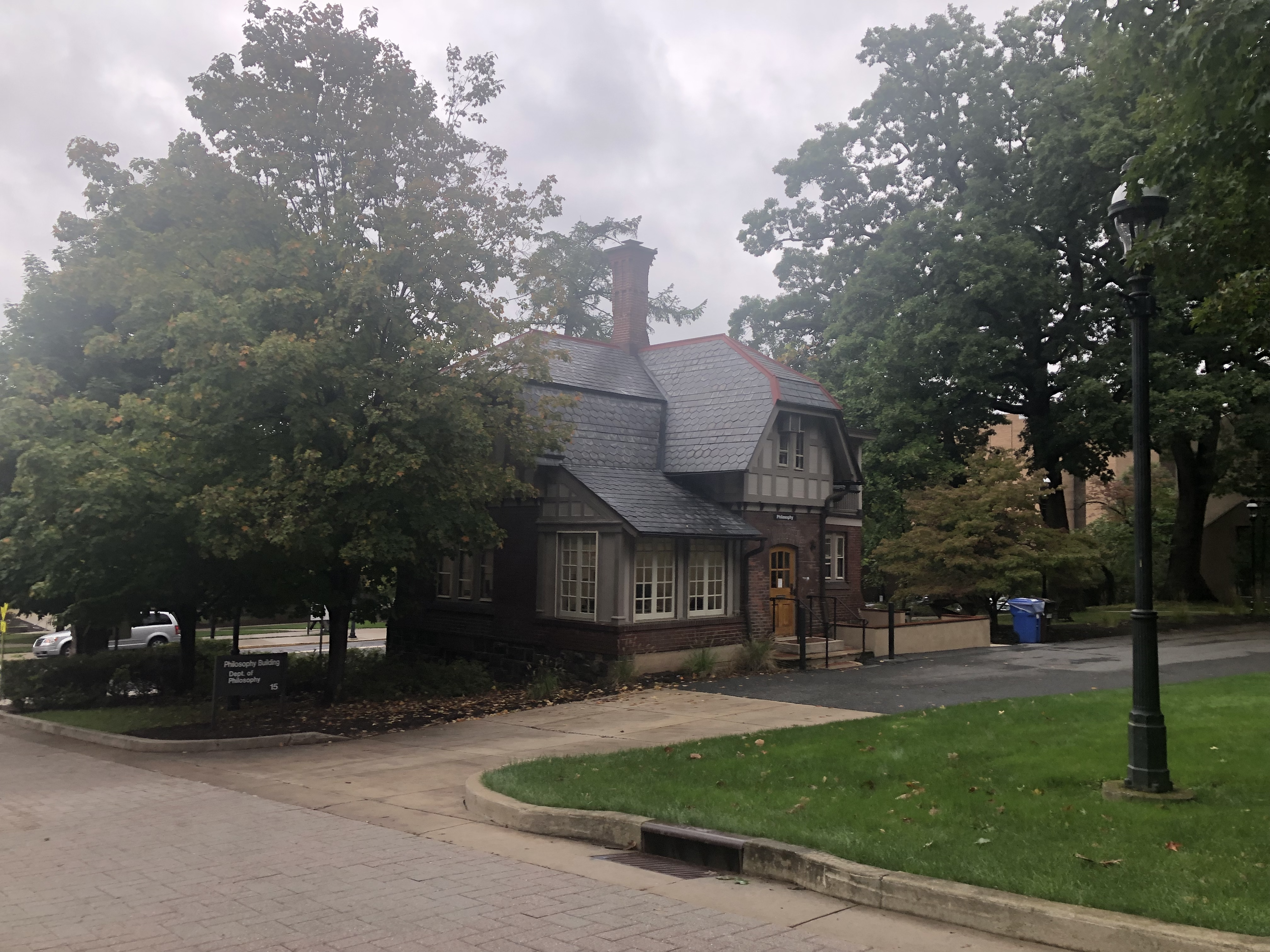
The Philosophy Building

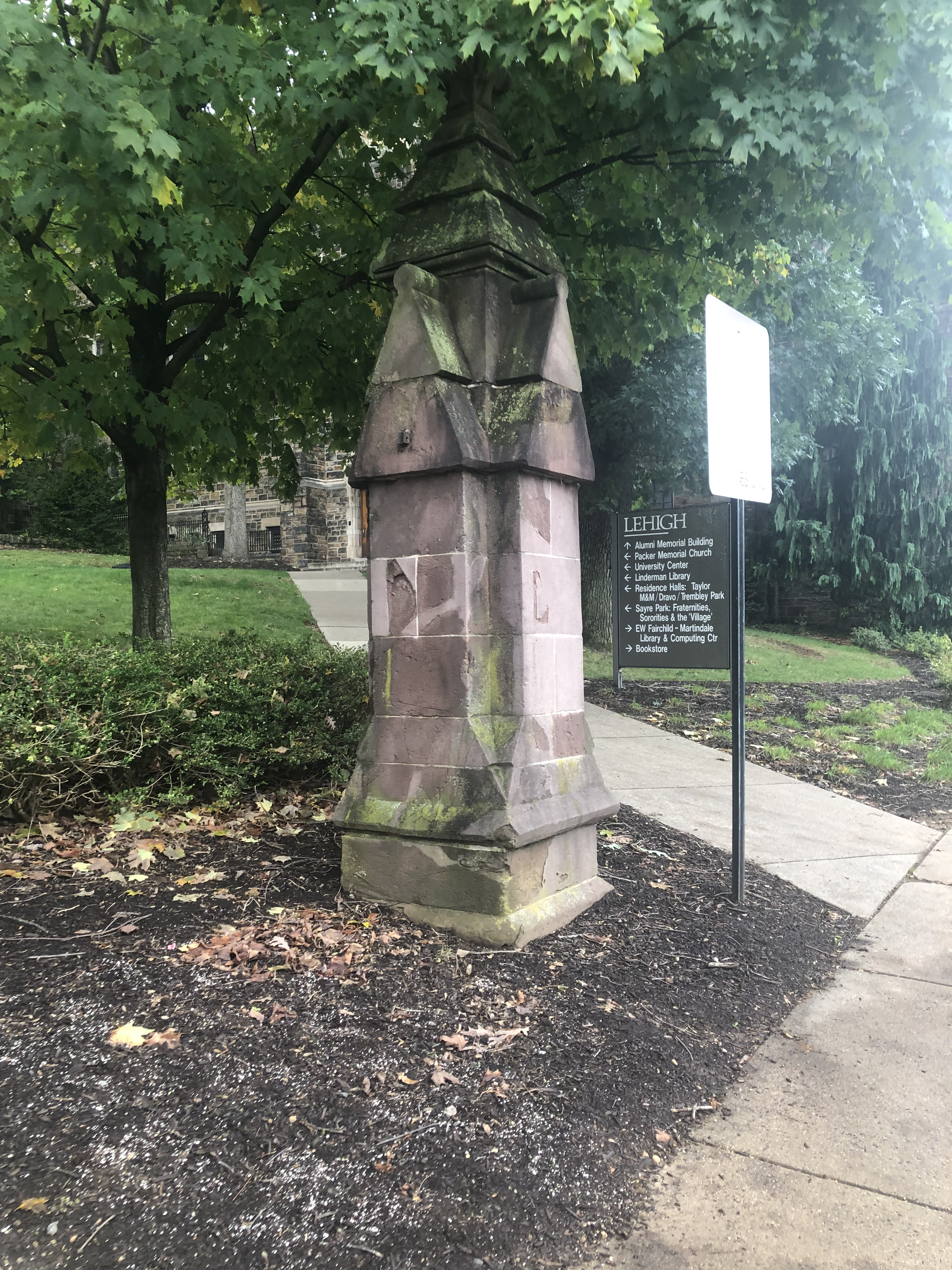
One of two remaining original gate and fence pillars

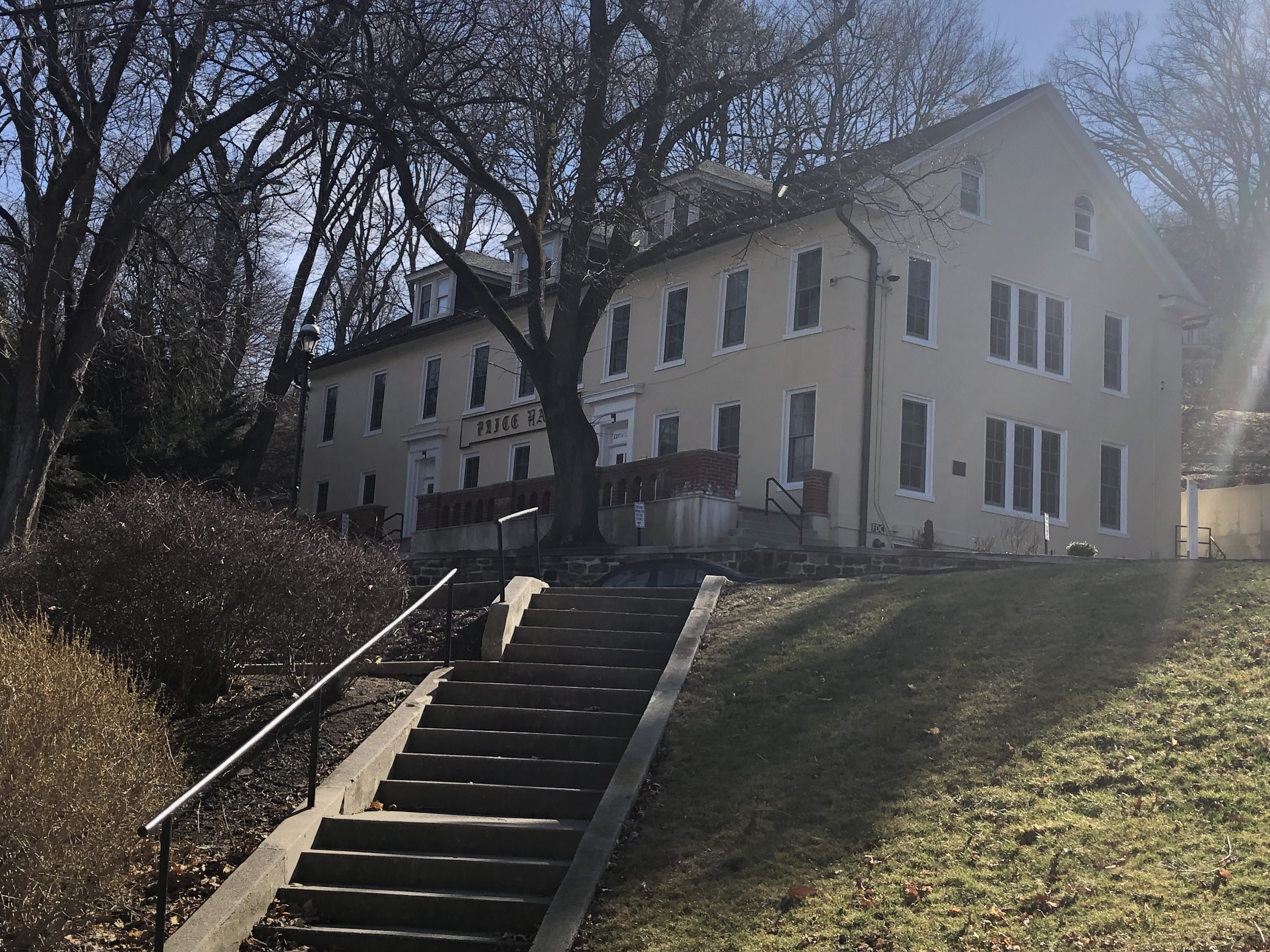
An exterior view of Price Hall in 2023

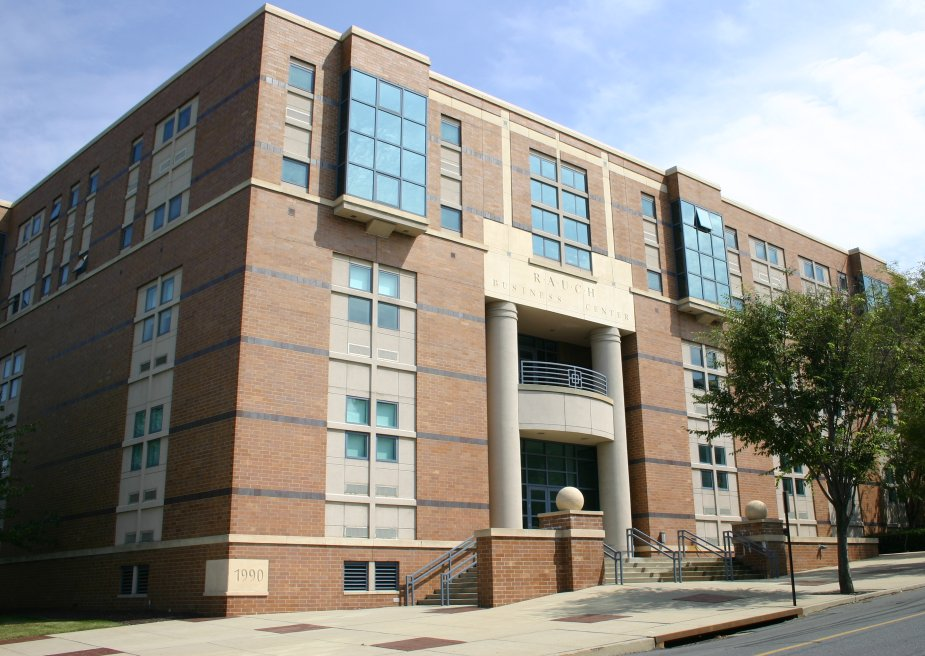
Rauch Business Center

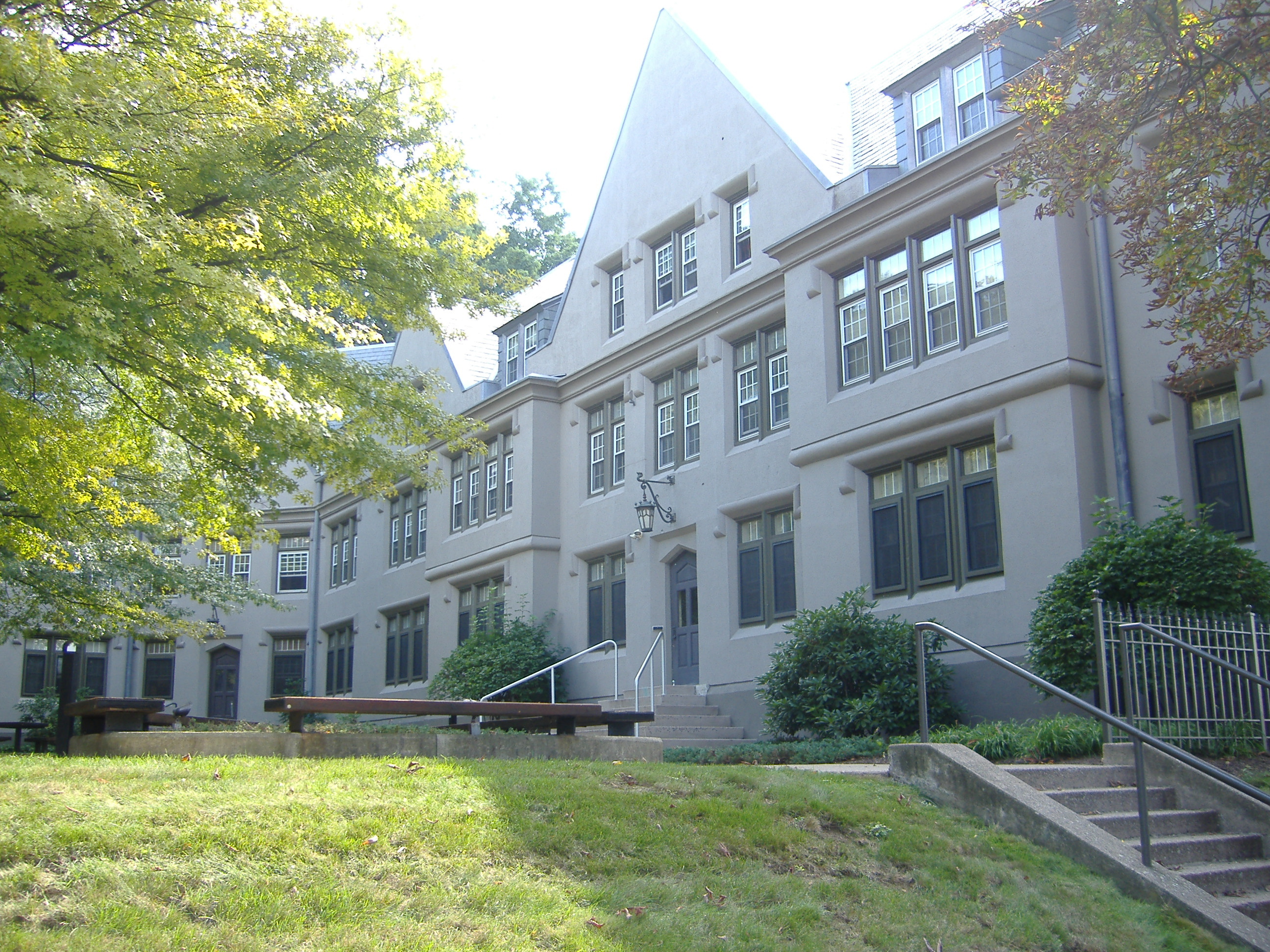
Taylor House

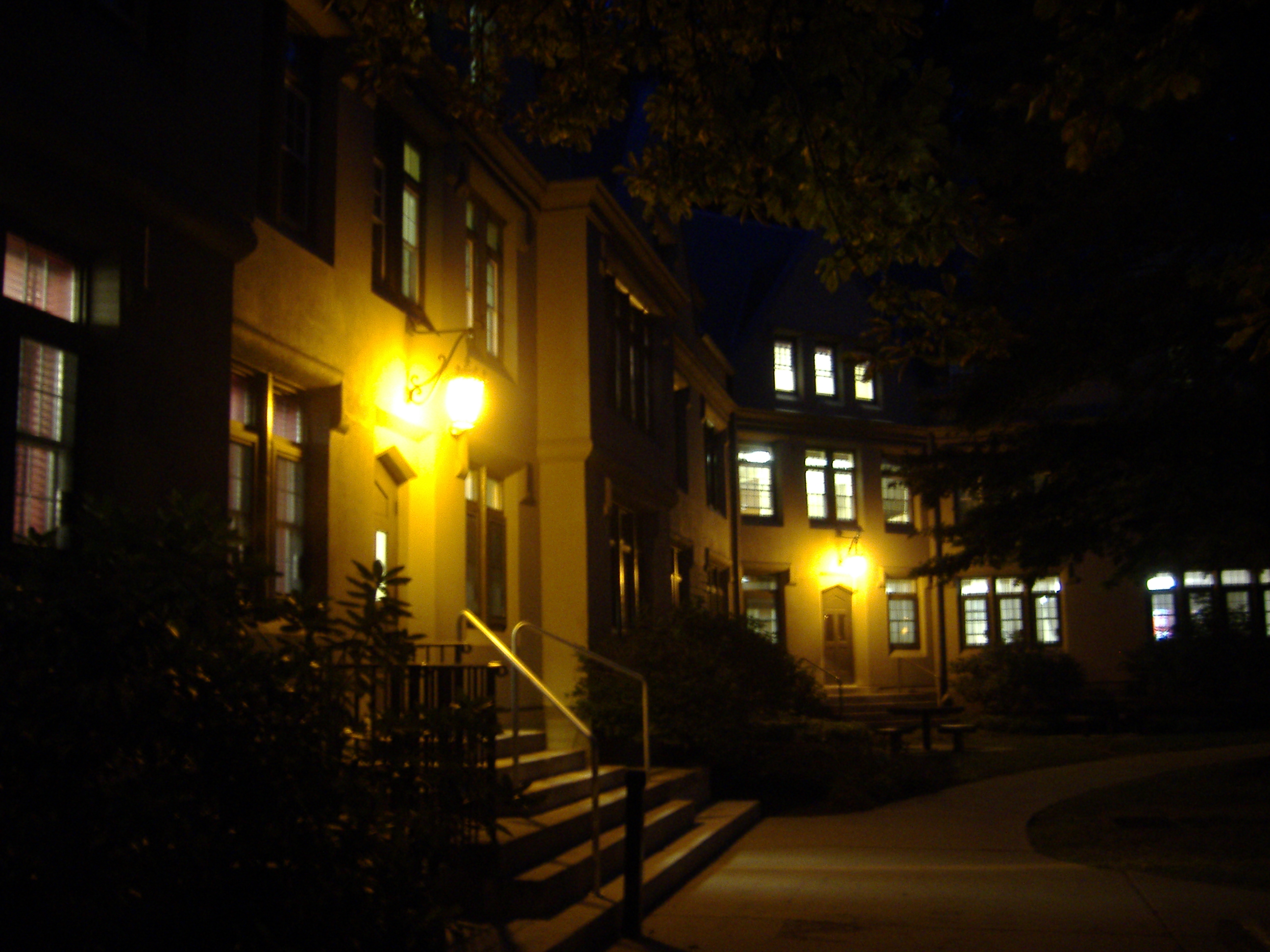
Taylor House at night

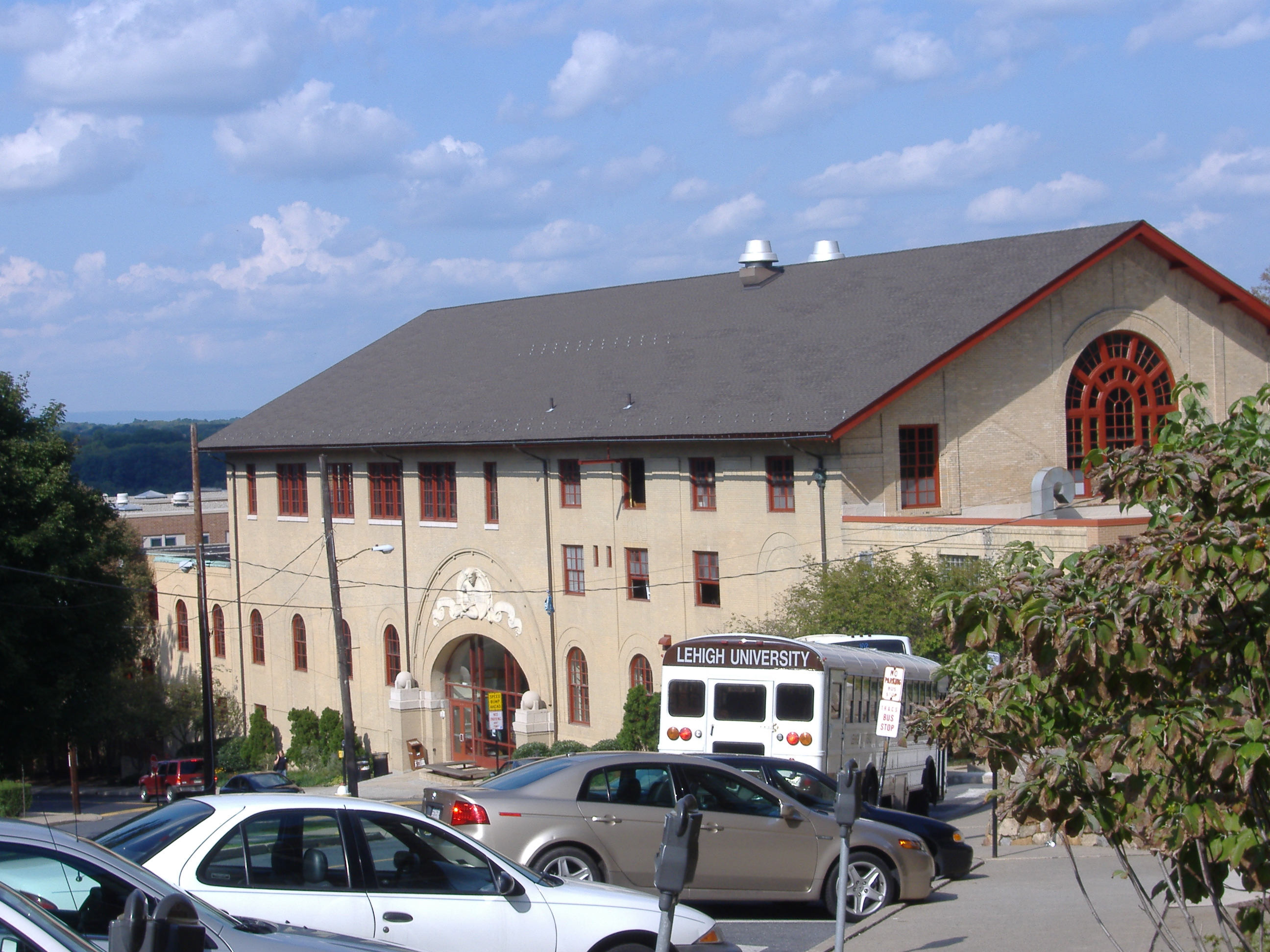
Taylor Gym

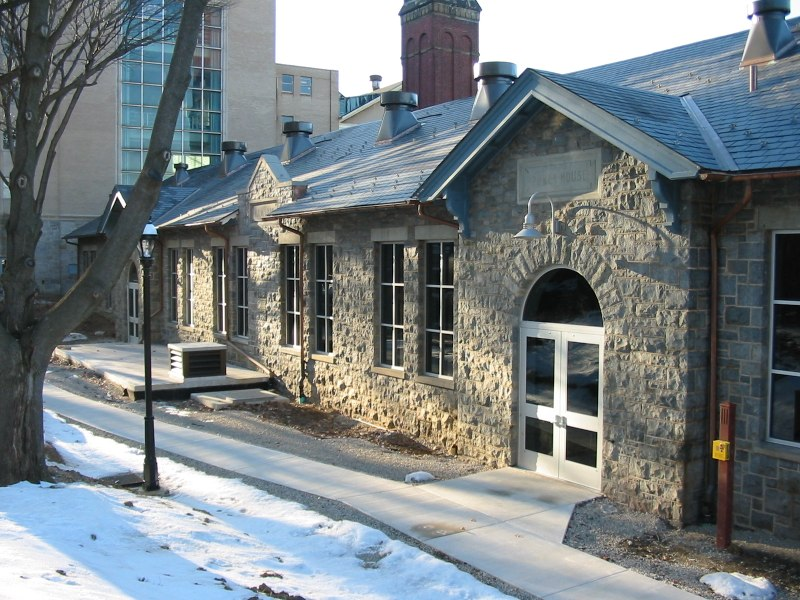
Wilbur Powerhouse post-renovation in March 2003

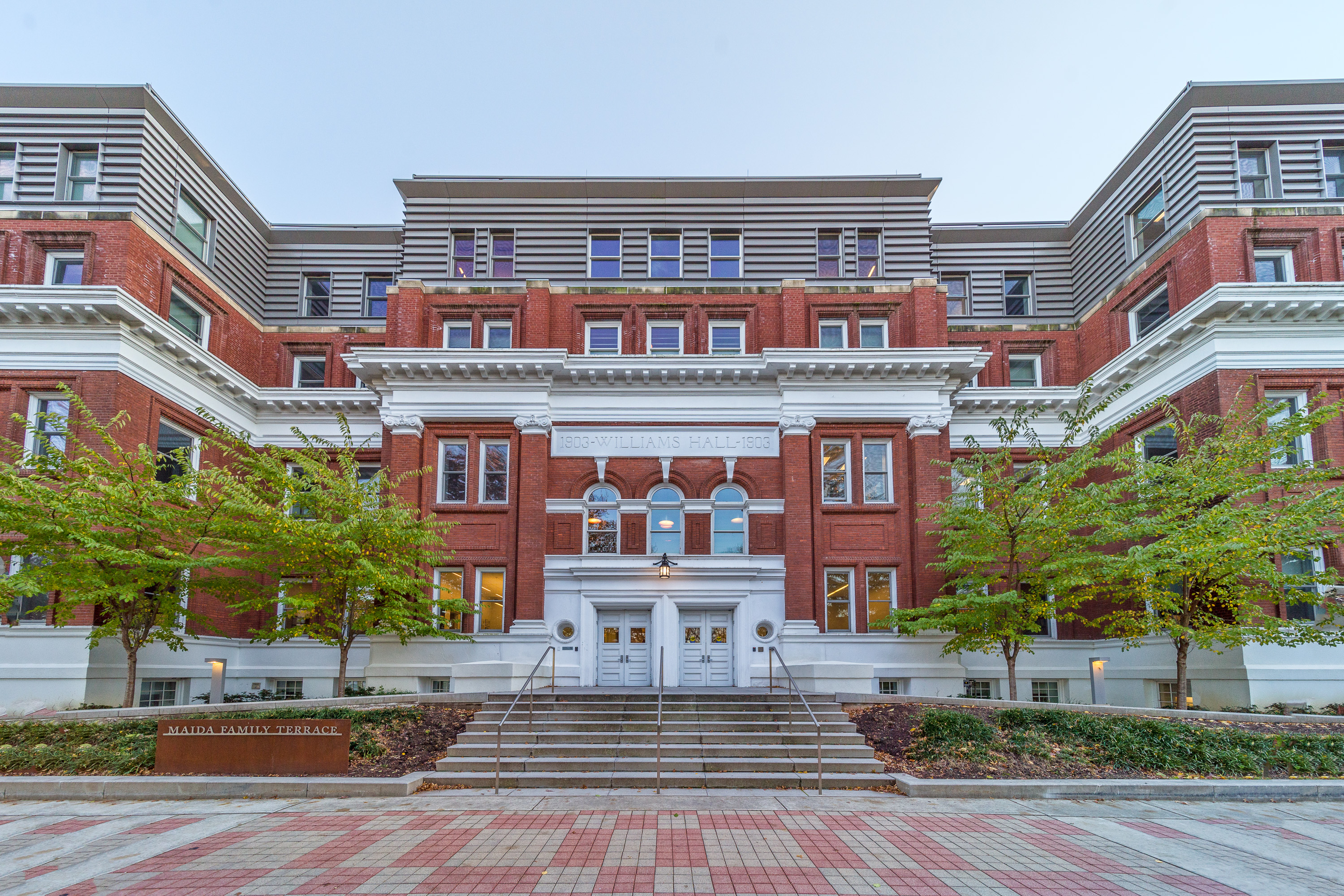
Williams Hall

The original Lehigh University campus contains most of the university's academic and residential buildings and sits on the north slope of South Mountain overlooking Bethlehem's Southside. This campus was named after the university's founder: Asa Packer. The campus has expanded many times during Lehigh's history, including the purchase of additional land and the construction of many of the existing buildings on the campus that have been acquired and then converted for various university uses. During recent years, several buildings have been constructed, expanded, or renovated and there have been efforts to improve traffic flow and pedestrian areas on and around the campus.

=== Alumni Memorial Building (1925) ===
The Alumni Memorial Building is a Gothic building near the center of campus, housing the Visitor Center, the Office of Admissions, the Alumni Association, and the Office of the President. The building is a memorial to the 1,921 Lehigh alumni who served in World War I and the 46 who died. Plaques commemorating those who served appear in the building's lobby. The building was meticulously conceived and designed by Lehigh alumni Theodore G. Visscher and James Lindsey Burley as an "architecturally unique memorial", according to Lehigh biographer W. Ross Yates. It took five years to complete. The building's signature ivy was quietly removed in 2020 while the campus was shut down for the COVID-19 pandemic, the school never commented on why it was removed.

=== Brodhead House (1979) ===
Brodhead is an air-conditioned six-story high-rise building with an elevator. These four-person suites house 194 second-year students and students living in two themes of the Upper Class Experience Residential Communities. Each suite has two double bedrooms or one double and two single bedrooms, and all suites have a furnished common area and a private bathroom.

=== Business Innovation Building (2023) ===
Lehigh's newest building, the Business Innovation Building was first planned in 2017 as an expansion for the growing College of business. 74,000 square feet and consists of 16 classrooms, study space, a mock trading floor, the "Center for Business Communication" as well as the Lehigh Business LUminaries exhibit, a celebration of successful College of Business alumni.

=== Campus Square / Farrington Square (2002) ===
The northern edge of campus, Farrington Square consists of apartment style undergraduate housing, the university bookstore, retail space, and a parking garage. Its architecture reflects some changing attitudes towards South Bethlehem by breaking the tradition of creating a visual wall between the campus and city. Instead, a plaza of buildings now opens out to the city along the New Street corridor at 4th street, and directly into Bethlehem. Originally named Campus Square beginning with its construction in 2000, the square, in 2015, was dedicated to Gregory Farrington, the 12th president of Lehigh University from 1998 to 2006, who was instrumental in the building's construction.

=== Centennial Complex (1965, 1971) ===
The six "Upper Centennials", which include the Congdon, Emery, Leavitt, McConn, Smiley, and Thornburg building, were built in 1965 for the university's 100th anniversary. They were upper-class residences, which selectively recruited rising freshman to join them. The Centennials competed in intramurals, had social dues and parties, elected officers, and had a similar structure to the Greek fraternities. They proved so popular that construction of six more was started in 1969, and were named the "Lower Centennials", including Beardslee, Carothers, Palmer, Stevens, Stoughton, and Williams. However, the introduction of co-education resulted in three of the new ones becoming Lehigh's first female residences in 1971 and the remaining three becoming non-selective men's residences. Today, the buildings act as co-ed dormitories for freshman students.

=== Chandler-Ullmann Hall (1883, 1938) ===
These adjoining buildings used to be the William H Chandler Chemistry Building (1883) and the Harry M. Ullmann Chemistry Laboratory (1938). William Chandler was appointed as professor of chemistry in 1871 and retired in 1905; during this time he guided the department and gained a national reputation for his work. The building was home to the Department of Chemistry until it moved into the new Seeley G. Mudd Building in 1976. Beginning in 1976, it housed the Department of Art, Architecture and Design and the Department of Psychology. In 2019, after an extensive $31 million interior renovation, the Department of Mathematics moved into the building, which it now shares with the Department of Psychology. The structure is considered by some architectural historians to be the first "modern" laboratory because of its system of ventilation and the design of its laboratories. The building, which won a prize for design at the Paris Exposition of 1889, was designated a National Historic Chemical Landmark by the American Chemical Society in 1994.

=== Christmas-Saucon Hall (1866, 1872) ===
Christmas Hall is the oldest structure on the Lehigh University campus and pre-dates the founding of the university.

In 1864, before plans for the university were drawn up, Asa Packer sold a lot on what would soon become Lehigh's campus, to a group of Moravians. They quite promptly erected a stone church, and services were commenced before the year was out. However, the young group soon received notification of Asa Packer's plans to found a university on the land all around the young Church. After negotiations, the Moravians agreed to move, provided another suitable plot of land was granted them. This was accomplished with the donation to the university, by the Augustus Wolfe Co., of land to the north of Packer Avenue. The converted Moravian Church did provide a building where instruction could proceed immediately. On September 3, 1866, rather than 1867 or 1868 as initially planned, the first classes were held here, with the school having admitted 39 young men.

The building served many functions in the first years, including those of a chemical laboratory, a library, chapel, classroom space, dorm rooms, and the president's office. With the university quickly growing, in 1872 Saucon Hall was built 50 feet to the east of Christmas Hall. In 1906, the newly formed marching band met here. And a half century later, the two structures would be integrated with the construction of a hyphen in 1927. It was home to the Mathematics Department until 2019, when it was moved to Chandler-Ullman Hall. It currently houses the study abroad offices, the LGBT Pride Center, the Multicultural Center and offices, The SOuRCe resource center, Center for Gender Equity, Student Involvement, Community Services, First Year Experiences, Student Center Facilities, Health Advancement and Prevent Strategies, Zoellner Art Center, and some lingering math classrooms.

=== Coppée Hall (1883) ===
Built to accommodate the gymnasium, it had a bowling alley on its ground floor and gymnasium space on the second floor. With the opening of Taylor Gym in 1914, Coppée Hall became the new home of the department of Arts and Sciences (now the College of Arts and Sciences after colleges were established in 1918) which now resides in Maginnes Hall. The College of Arts and Sciences moved out in 1918 and was replaced by the College of Business Administration (today the College of Business), which called Coppée home until 1957. Renovated in spring 2003 it currently houses the Department of Journalism and Communication with the first floor housing classrooms, the second floor offices, and the third floor being the home of the university newspaper The Brown and White. It is constructed of Potsdam sandstone, with facings in stone of a lighter hue. It was planned by Addison Hutton, architect, of Philadelphia, valuable assistance in the elaboration of the details being rendered by Dr. Sargent of Cambridge. The building was named in honor of Lehigh's first president and professor of the arts, Henry Coppée.

=== Coxe Hall (1910) ===
Named after Eckley Brinton Coxe, it was built as a mining laboratory. The construction was funded by his wife Sophia G. Coxe. Both Eckley B. (an early member of the board of trustees) and wife Sophia, were major contributors to the university, notably so during the difficult times of the 1890s. The building completed massive renovations in 2004 and was turned into the Baer International Center, housing the ESL Department, the Global Union, and the Study Abroad offices.

=== Drown Hall (1908) ===
Drown Hall was built as the student center; it became home of the business school prior to the development of Rauch Business Center. It is now the home of the English Department. Drown Hall also has a student writing and math help center on the first floor. It was named after university president Thomas Messinger Drown.

=== Mart Library (1969) and E.W. Fairchild-Martindale Library (1985) ===
A high technology edifice near Farrington Square, is of modern design and houses science and engineering collections, the Media Center, library and technology services staff, a computer center, and the Digital Media Studio. The original southern half of the Fairchild-Martindale library is the Mart Science and Engineering Library, constructed in 1969, as its name suggest acting as the university's Science and Engineering library, while Linderman Library acted as the humanities library.

Mart Library was dedicated by Leon T. Mart, class of 1913, and his wife Clara W. Mart, with the library being a memorial for their son, Thomas L. Mart, class of 1951, who died in an auto accident in 1949. In 1984, a massive expansion to the library along with a large northern section and a connecting glass foyer to the Mart Library was announced. The new library complex would become known as the Fairchild-Martindale Library with the construction of the northern wing, and the adjoining foyer, costing $10.9-million and the new library was dedicated on October 18, 1985.

The Fairchild-Martindale library was named after E.W. Fairchild, founder of Fairchild Fashion Media, and was dedicated by Harry T. Martindale, class of 1927 and vice president of Fairchild Media, and his wife Elizabeth Fairchild, E.W. Fairchild's daughter. The southern wing still bears the Mart Library name, despite any distinction of the libraries being lost.

=== Fritz Engineering Laboratory (1910, 1955) ===
The Fritz Engineering Laboratory was opened in 1910 and refurbished in the 1955. It is named after John Fritz. Opened in June 1910, the Fritz Engineering Laboratory symbolized Lehigh's dedication to an excellent engineering education. The original Fritz Engineering Laboratory included many state-of-the-art testing machines, including the 800,000-pound Riehle universal testing machine which was used to test many bridge components including pieces of the George Washington Bridge, the Tacoma Narrows Bridge, and structural pieces used in the Panama Canal and Golden Gate Bridge. Steel for the Golden Gate Bridge was manufactured at Bethlehem Steel in Bethlehem, tested at Lehigh University, and then shipped away to be assembled and constructed.

In 1953, a groundbreaking ceremony was held for a seven-story addition which would include a new universal testing machine. This five million pound load capacity universal testing machine built by Baldwin-Lima-Hamilton (BLH), was the largest machine of its time. The machine weighed over 450 tons and could test the tension and compression forces of structures up to 40 feet in height. Upon the reopening in 1955, Fritz Laboratory was once again a state-of-the-art testing center. The Baldwin universal testing machine, 76 feet tall including 16 feet below the test floor, was the largest test machine of its kind when it was installed. In addition to multiple testing machines, Fritz Lab included laboratories for soil mechanics, sanitation, structural models, hydraulics, and concrete research. The lab allowed undergraduate and graduate students to study subjects such as reinforced concrete, the modeling of dams, and the strength of novel structural materials.

In 1992, the original Fritz Laboratory was named as a Civil Engineering Landmark by the American Society of Civil Engineers. The John Fritz Engineering Laboratory also celebrated its 100th anniversary in October 2009 with a large celebration. During the three-day event, there were speeches and activities to celebrate the legacy of John Fritz and the lab that he provided to Lehigh University. Fritz Lab, including the Riehle and BLH testing machines, are used by students, faculty, and researchers to test the strength of building components and gain new knowledge.

=== Grace Hall and Caruso Wrestling Complex (1942, 2013) ===
Grace Hall is home to Lehigh's nationally ranked wrestling and women's volleyball programs. The facility, known colloquially as "The Snake Pit", underwent a substantial renovation and re-opened in November 2003. The building's lower level, renamed Leeman-Turner Arena at Grace Hall, seats 2,200 and is also used for intramural and club sports, concerts and lectures. The upper level housed the Ulrich Student Center, including a movie theater, post office, and the studios of WLVR. The building's upper floor was home to the ROTC and AFROTC departments from 1941 to 1994 and was dedicated as the Ulrich Student Center on April 7, 1995.

In the summer of 2012, renovation began to eliminate Ulrich Student Center converting the space into the Caruso Wrestling Complex. The new space will house a new hall of champions, coaches offices, and training space. The post office was relocated to Farrington Square, and the community service office relocated to the UC. There are no announced plans for Subversions, the Kenner Theater, WLVR-FM, or the lost club space. It is named after Ronald J. Ulrich and Eugene Gifford Grace.

W. Ross Yates has described the initial vision and construction of Grace Hall, saying "[Eugene G.] Grace asked [Lehigh President Clement C.] Williams how much it would cost, and Williams immediately replied, 'Three hundred thousand dollars.'...'I thought it would cost more,' Grace is reported to have said later, but he agreed to pay for the building." Few if any building projects, writes Yates, have been more popular with the Lehigh University community than the palestrae, Grace Hall. All stood to gain something by it, as it could accommodate many and various large functions. However, "[by] the time Grace Hall was completed the cost was more than twice Williams's original estimate. Grace probably swallowed hard, but he paid the bills," Yates says. Eugene Grace was president of Bethlehem Steel.

=== Harold S. Mohler Laboratory ===
The building used to be a Jewish synagogue, and the original stained glass windows can still be seen. It stands immediately adjacent to the main campus, across Brodhead Ave. The building is named after Harold S. Mohler, former chairman of The Hershey Company and chairman of the board of trustees at Lehigh from 1973 to 1985. The laboratory houses the Institute for Robotics, Center for Design and Manufacturing Innovation, the Manufacturing Systems Engineering Program and the department of Industrial Engineering.

=== Health, Science and Technology (HST) Building (2022) ===
Purpose built for Lehigh's newest College, the College of Health, the 195,000-square-foot facility houses faculty, administrative and programmatic staff, wet and dry labs, and community resources. The building was designed with large floor to ceiling glass walls to promote cooperation and openness.

=== Johnson Hall (1954) ===
This administrative building is home to several university offices, including Counseling Services, Chaplain's Office, Campus Police, Health, and Wellness Center, and Parking Services. Because of the slope of South Mountain, Johnson Hall is one of several buildings on campus in which there are entrances on multiple levels. The downhill (North) entrance is two floors below the South entrance. The building is constructed of stone.

=== Lamberton Hall (1907) ===
The structure served as the university commons and dining room until the renovation of Packer Hall in 1958. The building honors the memory of Robert A. Lamberton, third president. The basement contained a small bore rifle range used by ROTC and the university rifle team. It housed the music department until its move to the Zoellner Arts Center. In January 2006 it reopened as a late-night diner and student programming facility.

=== Lewis Laboratory (1895) ===
Lewis Laboratory is 235 feet (72 m) in length and five stories high. The building is home to the Lehigh Physics Department, named after Willard Deming Lewis, physicist and Lehigh's 10th and longest serving president from 1964 to 1982. The laboratory was destroyed by fire in 1900, it was quickly rebuilt. The fire was caused by curtains catching fire near an optics experiment. Due to communication problems, adequate equipment to put out the fire did not arrive until it was too late to save much of the building. It now houses a large lecture hall on the second floor, laboratories on the first and second floors, classrooms on the third floor, offices on the fourth floor, and more classrooms and laboratories on the fifth floor. It is also home to the advanced optics lab. Part of the Sherman Fairchild Center for the Physical Sciences: a three-part continuous building consisting of the historic Lewis Lab, the Sherman Fairchild Lab, and the auditorium and hallways, constructed during the 1980s, and generally considered part of Lewis Lab that serves as a connector between the two main building sections, and the main entrance to the complex.

=== Linderman Library (1877) ===
Designed by Philadelphia architect Addison Hutton and built by founder Asa Packer as a memorial to his daughter, Lucy Packer Linderman. The original rotunda is surrounded except on the south by a major addition constructed in 1929 that was designed by Theodore C. Visscher and James L. Burley. The building houses more than 20,000 rare books and volumes related to the humanities and social sciences.

The building was closed for extensive renovations from May 2005 until March 19, 2007, under the architects MGA Partners. The renovations added new classrooms and seminar rooms, a humanities commons, new computer technology, wired and wireless networking spaces for students working on team projects, a cafe, new climate control systems to preserve the collections and provide a comfortable environment for students, faculty and staff, and also enhanced building access and navigation for handicapped users. The renovation also opened up the top floor which had previously been closed to the public.

=== Maginnes Hall (1971) ===
The offices of the College of Arts and Sciences and several of its departments are located in Maginnes Hall. In addition to classrooms and faculty offices, Maginnes houses the International Multimedia Resource Center and its "World View Room," where students and faculty can watch domestic and international cultural and news programs on wide-screen television down-linked via satellite. The ground floor of Maginnes used to house the University Bookstore which was relocated to Campus Square upon its completion. The building is connected to the STEPS building via a passageway on the second floor. The dedication for the College of Arts and Science is interesting. It reads: Albert Bristol Maginnes "Alumnus and Trustee of Lehigh University, he excelled in many fields: the law, athletics, music and the fine arts. His life was one of integrity and service; his love of man, his gentleness and warmth of personality enriched those whose lives he touched. He enabled many men to come to Lehigh University; he advised them to the life of inquiry and truth which was his own." Mr. Maginnes was the Class of 1921.

=== McClintic-Marshall House (1957) ===
McClintic-Marshall House, commonly referred to as M&M, is a four-story, H-shaped building composed of sandstone. This dormitory was completed in 1957 by architect Frederick Larson. The structure was built in memory of Howard H. McClintic and Charles D. Marshall who both graduated from Lehigh University as Civil Engineers in 1888. In 1900, the pair formed a bridge building and steel fabrication firm, the McClintic-Marshall Construction Company. The company worked on significant projects including the George Washington Bridge, locks for the Panama Canal, and the Cathedral of Learning.

M&M is a freshman-only dorm, coeducational by section. The first floor serves as the main entry-way into the building. Located on the left (A) wing is a game room/lounge area with a billiards table, ping-pong table, some sofas, and a widescreen flat-panel plasma television. The right (B) wing of the ground floor has a luggage storage room and two laundry rooms. The top three floors provide residence to about 92 students each, making a total of 276. Each floor has two sections following the A and B layout which are separated by a shared lounge/study area. The sections are referenced by the wing followed by the floor number, i.e., A2 is the A wing of the second floor. Floor numbering is G, 1, 2, 3.

=== Neville Hall ===
This building in the chemistry complex has three auditoriums used for lectures and events. The building is named for Dr. Harvey A. Neville, president from 1961 to 1964, who was a chemist. An interesting structure which forms an integrated complex with the Mudd building to the East, it is constructed of mirror-like glass and reddish brown brick.

=== Packard Laboratory (1929) ===
Named and funded by James Ward Packard, one of the inventors of the first Packard automobile, this building is a typical example of the collegiate gothic style. It serves as the headquarters for the P.C. Rossin College of Engineering and Applied Sciences. Within the building are several large lecture halls, an exhibit of the first Packard automobile, and many laboratories.

J. W. Packard '84, was a retiring individual and founder of the Packard Motor Car Company. He chose to live in Ohio near the Western Pennsylvania border, rather than Detroit, and shunned publicity. However, come the mid-1920s he realized he was dying, and wanted to do something for his alma mater. This happened to be a time of great expansion for the university. Corresponding with president C. R. Richards, and Eugene G. Grace, head of Bethlehem Steel, it was decided he would aid with the design and construction of the new laboratory for Mechanical and Electrical Engineering. Upon giving Lehigh a gift of securities amounting to a million dollars, the design was commenced by alumni T.C. "Speed" Visscher '99 and J.L. Burley '94. Mr. Packard had notified the school that he wanted a design combining functional utility and artistic beauty. University architects Visscher and Burley, working with various professors, and town architect A. W. Litzenburger, finished a plan, yet they soon realized an extra $200,000 was needed to complete it as envisioned. W R. Okeson, a university official and an alumni contact, sent this news to Packard, who duly mailed back a check for the extra $200,000. An intriguing rectangular, Gothic building, Packard Lab remains a university landmark.

=== Packer Memorial Church (1887) ===
The chapel was built as the campus' Episcopal church, but is now an interfaith facility. On Sundays, Roman-Catholic mass is usually held at 9:10 pm and 12:10 pm; on Fridays, Muslim prayer is held at 1:10 pm. It is also available for weddings in which at least one of the parties is a Lehigh University student or alumnus. It used to be the location of the freshman convocation which is held during orientation at the beginning of each school year, however due to the growing class size, in 2007 convocation was moved to the larger Baker Auditorium in the Zoellner Arts Center.

Designed by Addison Hutton in a robust gothic revival style, it has red slate brought from Vermont. The church, sometimes referred to as a chapel, has one of the three towers on campus, with the others being Packer Hall (the "UC"), and the Alumni Mem. Bld.

=== Packer Hall / the University Center / Clayton University Center (1868) ===
When it was first built, it housed a chapel, classrooms, offices, drafting rooms, and dormitories. It was the first building specifically built for Lehigh University.

As the years passed functional use of the dignified building of Packer have naturally changed. In 1958, during the Whitaker administration, and as part of a more general effort to modernize and update much of the campus, a massive three story stone addition was placed on the south, or mountain, side. This provided increased room for dining halls, lounges, facilities, a snack bar, and even for a short time the bookstore (until it was moved to the basement of Maginnes Hall in 1970). From the exterior, it is difficult to see where the old building leaves off and the new begins, for as W. Ross Yates notes, the administrators took care to preserve many of the lineaments of the original structure. Prior to its 2022-2023 renovations it housed student and faculty dining facilities, food courts, deans' offices, the military science (ROTC) department, the Women's Center, The Center for Academic Success, Office of Multicultural Affairs, The Pride Center (LGBTQIA Programs and Outreach), a bank office, and conference facilities.

=== Gatehouse / Philosophy Building (1879) ===
Located just below Packer Memorial Church, this building used to be the home of the Lehigh gatekeeper and porter. In the university's initial form, a wrought iron fence with stone pillars surrounded the entire campus, which was bound by Brodhead ave, university drive, Taylor street and East Packer ave with the sole entry and exit point being a gate located at the then northern edge of campus, where the Philosophy Buildings stands. As the university grew, it expanded beyond its original borders and the fence around campus was torn down, except for the two posts on either side of the original gate, and the position of porter was phased out.

The building, due to its location nestled between Packer Memorial and Christmas-Saucon, was too small to build anything else, and was instead transformed into the home of the Philosophy Department.

=== Price Hall (1899) ===
Originally named Die Alte Brauerei, the building belonged to an independent brewery located at the border of the original campus, it was purchased by Lehigh in 1899, allegedly because then university president, Robert H. Sayre deemed an off campus brewery as a bad influence. It kept its name until it was renamed after Henry R. Price, an alumnus of the class of 1870, and the then president of the board of trustees, in 1916 during a renovation that turned it into a dormitory.

However, its status as a dormatory was abandoned due to its small size. Price hall has largely sat empty since the 60's but was temporally used as the home for portions of the psychology and math departments during renovations to Chandler-Ullman from 2018 to 2019. The building currently house the LU Facilities offices which is in charge of managing all of Lehigh's buildings and properties.

=== The Quad (1938-1948) ===
Previously called the "Freshman Quad", the classic collegiate stone residence halls of Dravo House, Richards House, and Drinker House room freshman. All are massive stone structures composed largely during the depression, and are Lehigh's highest structures, with respect to altitude, outside of Sayre Park, and on the Asa Packer campus. A fourth was planned but never constructed, leaving the three existing dormitories arranged in an informal triangular setting.

=== Rathbone Hall (1972) ===
Completed in 1972 as the upperclass dining hall for the Centennials and named after Monroe Jackson Rathbone, it is modern in appearance and seems to hang off the mountain, being built in a very steep section and having ground floor access to each of its floors. The main part of the building is one of Lehigh's dining halls, offering sweeping views of the Lehigh Valley from the dining room. The lower floors of the building house offices and service areas.

=== Rauch Business Center (1990) ===
Home of the university's College of Business and Economics, comprises 115,000 square feet (10,700 m^{2}) of floor space on five stories and also houses the Career Services Office, and the Perella Financial Services Lab. Opened in 1990 on the site of the former Taylor Stadium. It is named after Philip Rauch.

=== Seeley G. Mudd Building ===
A seven-story building, constructed during the latter years of the W. Deming Lewis presidency, this houses laboratories and resources for chemistry students, and the chemistry department. The state-of-the-art equipment residing here includes an electron spectrometer for chemical analysis (ESCA), one of ten in the world, and the department's unique nuclear magnetic resonance imaging facility.

=== Sinclair Laboratory ===
Sinclair Laboratory serves one of the university's main research centers, including the Center for Optical Technologies, the International Materials Institute for Glass Forming, and an electron spectrometer for chemical analysis (ESCA), one of ten in the world.

=== STEPS Building (2010) ===
The 135,000 square feet (12,500 m^{2}) building on the corner of Packer Avenue and Vines Street was designed by Bohlin Cywinski Jackson architects, and opened in August 2010. STEPS stands for "Science, Technology, Environment, Policy and Society," and contains classrooms and laboratories mostly for the Earth & Environmental Science, Civil and Environmental Engineering, Chemistry and Biology departments. STEPS is supposed to represent “science in sight” so many of the labs are open. The Open style of the building is meant to represent and foster the open discussion from the various departments in the building. It contains many "green" features, including low flush toilets, heat shields to recycle energy from fume hoods, exhaust fans, and green roof to prevent soil runoff and hold in heat/AC. Outside STEPS there is a petrified tree stone that is over 360 million years old.

=== Taylor House (1907) ===
Taylor House is a dormitory for upper-class students at Lehigh University. It houses 145 sophomores in coeducational hallways.

Taylor, as the building is commonly named, is located next to the McClintic-Marshall House and across from the Trembley Park Apartments. It is shaped in a U divided into three sections. Each of these sections has lounge called either the red, blue, or green lounge. The lounges contain a small kitchen and a television set. Many of the rooms in Taylor Hall are doubles, interspersed with several singles throughout the building.

Taylor is one of the earliest concrete structures ever built. It was the gift of industrialist Andrew Carnegie in honor of his friend and associate, Lehigh trustee Charles L. Taylor, Class of 1876. In 1984 the building underwent a complete renovation.

=== Taylor Gymnasium (1907) ===
Taylor Gymnasium is home to the Lehigh Athletics Administrative and Coaches offices. It houses the Welch Fitness Center, Basketball Courts, Swimming Pools, Studio (Multi-purpose room), Locker Rooms, Penske Lehigh Athletics Hall of Fame, the Athletics Partnership, Athletic Store, and Youth Camps/Clinics Office. This building is named after Charles L. Taylor, although it sits on a street named Taylor, after Zachary Taylor.

=== Taylor Stadium (1914-1987) ===
Named after Charles L. Taylor, Taylor Stadium was designed by architect Henry Hornbostel and engineer Charles W. Leavitt and financed by alumni donations, largely from Charles M. Schwab. Located adjacent to Taylor Gymnasium, it sat at the intersection of Taylor Street and Packer Avenue, and was demolished in 1987 for the construction of the Rauch Business Center and the Zoellner Arts Center. Goodman Stadium was built in 1987 as its replacement. All that remains of Taylor Stadium is the foundations of the south grandstand and a memorial consisting of a plaque and the original sign and dedication.

=== Trembley Park (1975) ===
This "apartment-styled" student housing complex is located right in the middle of campus. It houses 176 upperclass students in four-person apartments that have one double and two single bedrooms, plus a kitchen, furnished living room/dining room and a private bathroom. Trembley Park referred to the complex as a whole, but the individual buildings had no special name, being named Building 71 through 77. The complex was intended to be temporary housing and has a design which contains no internal load bearing walls, allowing for the university to reconfigure the floor plan at any time. The complex was named in honor of Francis J. Trembley, a long-time professor of ecology at the school.

Trembley Park was slated for demolition in 2019, a plan which had been proposed as early as 2012, to replace the park of small apartment style dorms with a larger, more conventional dorm buildings to accommodate more students as part of the "Bridge West" development, two clusters of three residents halls. The north cluster, Singleton, Hitch, and Maida, were constructed in 2019, with the south cluster set to replace Trembley Park. The initial announcement would be walked back, as the school said the apartments would stay open until 2020 with the new dorms expected to open in 2021. The demolition would be further delayed until after the COVID-19 pandemic, as Trembley was used to quarantine infected students due to its proximity to the health and wellness center, and its apartment styled structure allowing for easy conversion to single residents. Today, the apartments are still standing and in use.

=== Whitaker Laboratory (1960) ===
It was built in 1960 and named after Martin Dewey Whitaker as the metallurgy and chemical engineering building. The Metallurgy Department has since become the Materials Science and Engineering Department, and is now the sole department in the building. Whitaker Lab consists of two major wings, the south wing a two floor section containing three lecture halls and the main entrance to the building, and the north wing, which is five floors high and contains offices, classrooms, and labs. The two wings are connected by an elevated walkway on the third floor. It is connected to the Mudd Building by a tunnel on the first floor.

=== Wilbur Powerhouse ===
This 17,000 square foot facility is open to all students from across the university's various colleges, involved in three of Lehigh's most innovative and multi-disciplinary programs: the master's degree in Technical Entrepreneurship (TE), Integrated Product Development (IPD), and Integrated Business and Engineering (IBE). The building includes the new Additive Manufacturing Lab (AML) supporting 3D printing on campus, a Mac and PC computer lab supporting 2D and 3D design and manufacturing, prototyping shops, teamwork areas, and A-V/HDTV meeting- and class-rooms.

It was built as a functional powerhouse for the lower campus in the early 20th century. It housed engineering labs, and eventually the Theater Department's “Wilbur Drama Workshop” black box theater until the construction and opening of the Zoellner Arts Center in 1996–1998.

In 2002, the Wilbur Powerhouse was completely renovated, and has been in operation supporting the above programs and many others since then.

=== Williams Hall (1904) ===
A Beaux Arts style three-story brick structure was designed by Jacob Weishampel and Biggin, an Allentown architectural firm. The building used to contain classrooms and laboratories for the Departments of Biological Sciences and of Earth and Environmental Sciences. A Vivarium was added in 1930 designed by architects Theodore Visscher and James Burley of New York City. This structure, located to the south of Williams Hall, is attached to the main building via an enclosed bridge. A fire destroyed the wood attic and third floor and in 1956 the building was remodeled including a new fourth floor. he modern facilities were available to support research in many areas including geochemistry, stable-isotope geochemistry, geochronology, paleomagnetics, seismology and high resolution geophysics, aquatic and ecosystems ecology, GIS and quantitative geomorphology, and water quality. Following a period of renovation, the building was rededicated in the fall of 2015; it now houses offices from Student Affairs and, academic departments including modern language and literature, religion studies, sociology, anthropology.

=== Zoellner Arts Center (1997) ===
Zoellner Arts Center is a 105,000-square-foot (9,800 m^{2}) arts center located on the campus, which opened in 1997, and houses the following facilities:

- Baker Hall - a 946-seat auditorium with multi-purpose proscenium stage, suited for concerts, stage productions, ceremonies and lectures.
- Diamond Theater - a small 309-seat 3/4 thrust theater with steeply raked stadium seating suited for theatrical and small music groups.
- Black Box Theater - a smaller 125-seat theater
- A two-story art gallery
- Additional facilities including several rehearsal rooms, recording studio, dance studio, practice rooms, scene shop, costume shop, dressing rooms and green room, classrooms, music library, box office, faculty and staff offices, and three large lobbies and a 345-car parking deck attached to the building.
- It is also home to the Music and Theater Departments.

The venue has had a wide array of performers, including the New York Philharmonic, Itzhak Perlman, Laurie Anderson, Lily Tomlin, Bernadette Peters, and Queen Latifah.

The building was designed by Dagit Saylor Architects in Philadelphia, and is named after Victoria E. and Robert E. Zoellner.

=== The Hill ===
The longtime home of Lehigh's fraternities, "the Hill" winds up the side of south Mountain on the way to the Mountaintop campus, behind the academic buildings of the Asa Packer campus. At its peak, there were 36 fraternity houses in the late 1980s, however, this number has since declined, with several of the houses being demolished to make way for expansions of the university.

==== Sayre Park (1997) ====
The upper half of the Packer Campus is Sayre Park, commonly called "The Hill". This former parkland now houses all Greek houses and the Sayre Park Residential Complex which houses 146 upperclassmen in three residential buildings and one common building.

==== ΨΥ (1892) ====
One of Lehigh's three original fraternity houses, built to house Psi Upsilon (ΨΥ), one of Lehigh's original fraternities, in 1892, making it the oldest house on campus. In addition to being the oldest house, ΨΥ also has the distinction of being one of the few fraternities to be the sole occupants of their house. In 1909, ΨΥ brother Robert Jarecki built a one-to-one replica of the house as his personal domicile in Erie, Pennsylvania.

==== ΣΝ / ΔΓ / House 82 / Park House (1900-2019) ====
House 82 was one of Lehigh's three original fraternity houses, being built to house Sigma Nu (ΣΝ), one of Lehigh's original fraternities, in 1900. In 1960 the structure would be demolished after a fire, and a newer, modern building would be built on the same site, also occupied by Sigma Nu. Sigma Nu's 102-year tenure in the house would end in 2002 when the fraternity was removed from campus after a hazing incident.

As with many of the now vacant fraternity houses on the Hill, the building was given to a sorority, in this case, Delta Gamma (ΔΓ). Delta Gamma would occupy the house until 2013 when the national leadership of Delta Gamma decided to self impose a removal of the chapter from campus. The building sat vacant for nearly a year as the school looked for other fraternity and sorority tenants, but found none, converting the building into a small dorm named Park House (due to its large lawn), which opened to students in 2014.

In 2019 the school announced, and executed, the rapid demolition of Park House, turning the site into the northern half of the "Bridge West" development, constructing the large, and modern, Singleton, Hitch, and Maida dorms on the former location.

== Mountaintop Campus ==
Built as Bethlehem Steel's Homer Research Labs, the Mountaintop Campus is 742-acre (3.00 km^{2}) and was acquired by Lehigh in 1986. It is home to the College of Education and facilities for the Civil Engineering, Chemical Engineering, and Biological Sciences departments. The campus offers some of the most comprehensive views of the Lehigh Valley that surrounds the university and Bethlehem.

Principal buildings on the campus include:

=== Iacocca Hall (1958) ===
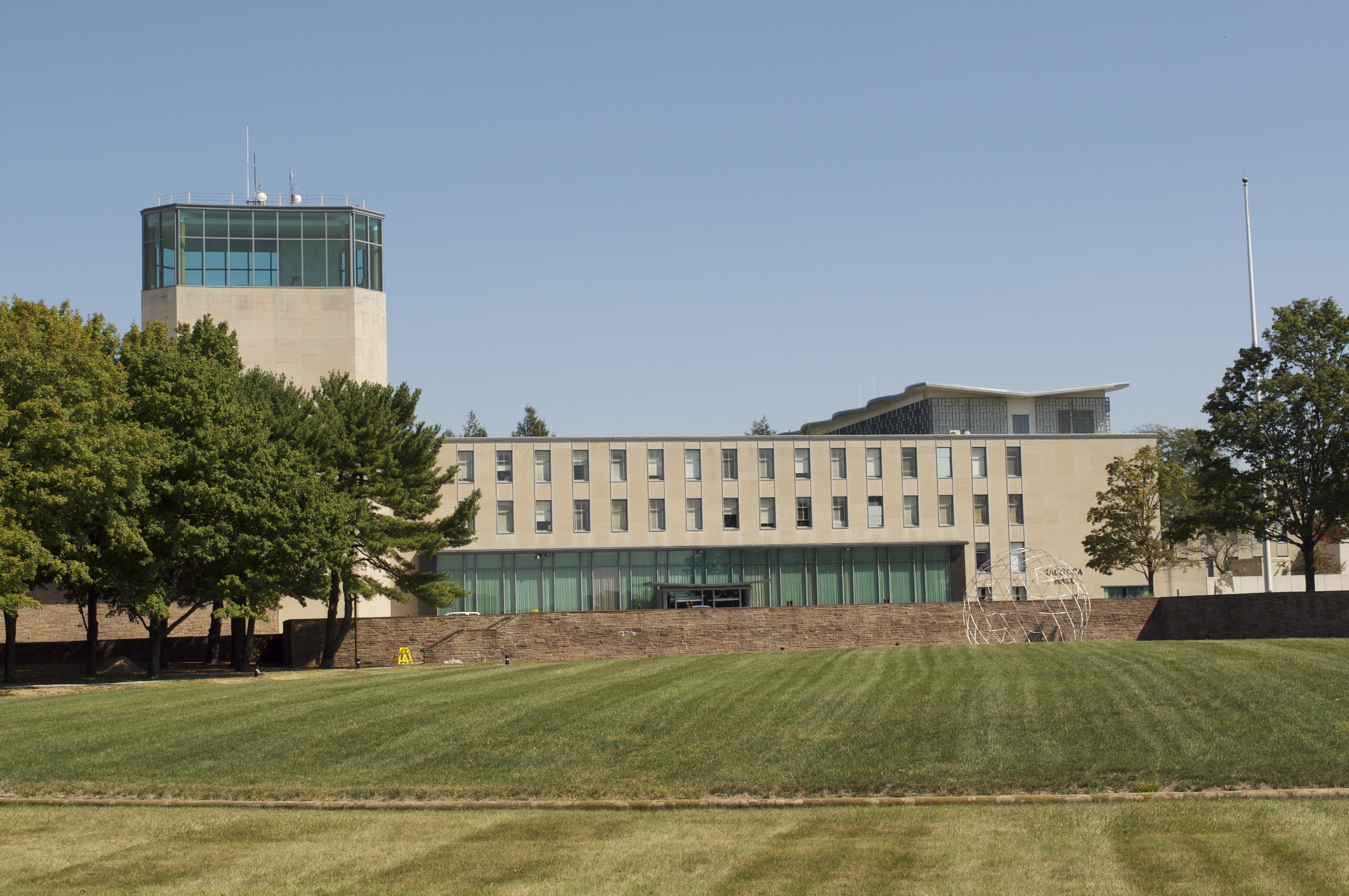
Iacocca Hall, named for Lehigh alumnus Lee Iacocca, on the Mountaintop Campus in September 2010

Iacocca Hall, named for Lehigh alumnus Lee Iacocca, was initially named Homer Research Labs and was affiliated with Bethlehem Steel. Also known as the tower building, it houses the College of Education, the Chemical Engineering Department, the Biological Sciences Department, a dining room, food services facilities, and a teleconferencing classroom.

=== Building C ===
Building C also originally belonged to the Bethlehem Steel. It now houses the Mountaintop Initiative and was renovated in 2017 to house the Art, Architecture, and Design Department and the Computer Science & Engineering Department.

=== Jordan Hall ===
Jordan Hall also originally belonged to the Bethlehem Steel. It now houses Administrative offices, the Department of Military Science (ROTC), Distance Education & Summer Sessions, and LU Facilities.

=== Imbt Laboratories ===
Imbt Laboratories hosts the Advanced Technology for Large Structural Systems (ATLSS) Engineering Research Center and the Energy Research Center.

=== Sayre Field (1966) ===
Located on South Mountain and the only flat area on the mountain, Sayre Field is used for intramural sports. It comprises roughly 10 acres, and was attained by Lehigh as an exercise and sporting field during the university's extensive property purchasing and swapping initiatives in the 1950s to 1960s. The sporting field initially was led and managed by Bethlehem Steel, and involved the university with Bethlehem. The field area includes other public and private concerns, including Moravian College, also based in Bethlehem.

== Murray H. Goodman Campus (1960) ==
The Saucon Valley Playing Fields were renamed after Murray H. Goodman, a Lehigh University alumnus and key contributor to the university during the difficult days of the 1980s, when Bethlehem Steel suffered decline. The land, embracing six hundred acres, was obtained during the complex expansion days for Steel, being the early post War period (1950s - 1960s). During the latter Lehigh agreed to purchase the property for roughly one thousand dollars per acre. The campus sits on the relatively flat lands of Saucon Valley, which is south of South Mountain and across Interstate 78 from the other two campuses. Primarily a sporting campus, it contains the Stabler Convocation Center, and its only on campus graduate housing. The new football stadium resides here, as do most of Lehigh's other athletic facilities, including fields for Baseball and Softball, outdoor track, Tennis and Squash courts, and numerous practice fields. The following are the major structures and arenas:

=== Cundey Varsity House ===
A strength-training center for Lehigh athletic teams. It includes a 5,000-square foot weight room, locker rooms for eight sports, meeting rooms and sports medicine facilities.

=== Rauch Field House (1977) ===
Provides indoor practice fields, an indoor running track, and locker rooms for the various teams.

=== Stabler Arena & Convocation Center (1979) ===
A 6,000 capacity arena for concerts, sports (including Lehigh's basketball teams), and other events.

=== David J. Walker Field at Legacy Park ===
Unveiled in April 2015, J. David Walker Field at Legacy Park is home to Lehigh Baseball. At that start of the 2017 season the field was renamed after David J. Walker when his twin sons James and Neal Walker donated funds to upgrade the fields. David was a professor of mechanical engineering at Lehigh from 1978 to 2003 who owned a house near Goodman campus where he took his kids to practice baseball.

As part of the 2015 renovations the grass infield was replaced with synthetic turf as well as new permanent grandstand seating and a modern cable and netting backstop. The field has two batting cages as well as a press-box.

In 2017 Lehigh started work on phase two of the renovations, which were completed later that year which included a new scoreboard, batter's eye, and outfield wall, as well as a pavilion and donor recognition plaza.

=== Mulvihill Golf Learning Center (2007) ===
Provides indoor swing analysis and putting facilities, and outdoor driving range, practice bunkers, and putting greens for developing golf skills. Lehigh's home venue for golf meets are the three highly rated courses of the nearby Saucon Valley Country Club, which has hosted six USGA tournaments including the USPGA Senior Open and the LPGA Women's US Open.

=== Murray H. Goodman Stadium (1988) ===
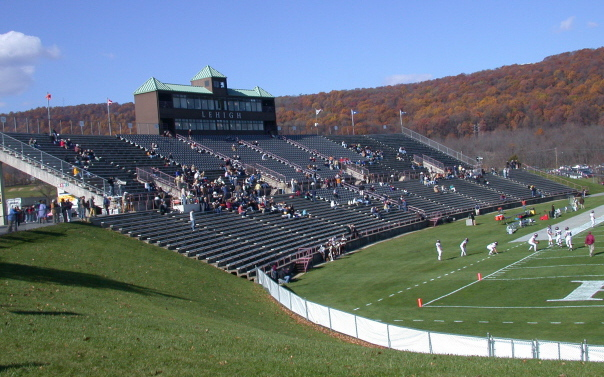
Lehigh's Goodman Stadium in October 2007

A 16,000 capacity stadium, Goodman Stadium has a three-tiered press box and limited chair back seating, and locker rooms for home and visiting teams. With views of South Mountain, it has been named "Best Game Atmosphere" by a Patriot League publication. It was erected in 1988 using a large grassy bowl that had long-awaited construction. From 1996 to 2012, the field also hosted the late summer annual training camp of the National Football League's Philadelphia Eagles.

=== Ulrich Sports Complex (1999) ===
A dual field complex for men's and women's soccer, men's and women's lacrosse, and field hockey. The complex has natural grass and artificial turf. Permanent seating, a press box and lighting are available.
