= Northeastern Pennsylvania =

Northeast Pennsylvania
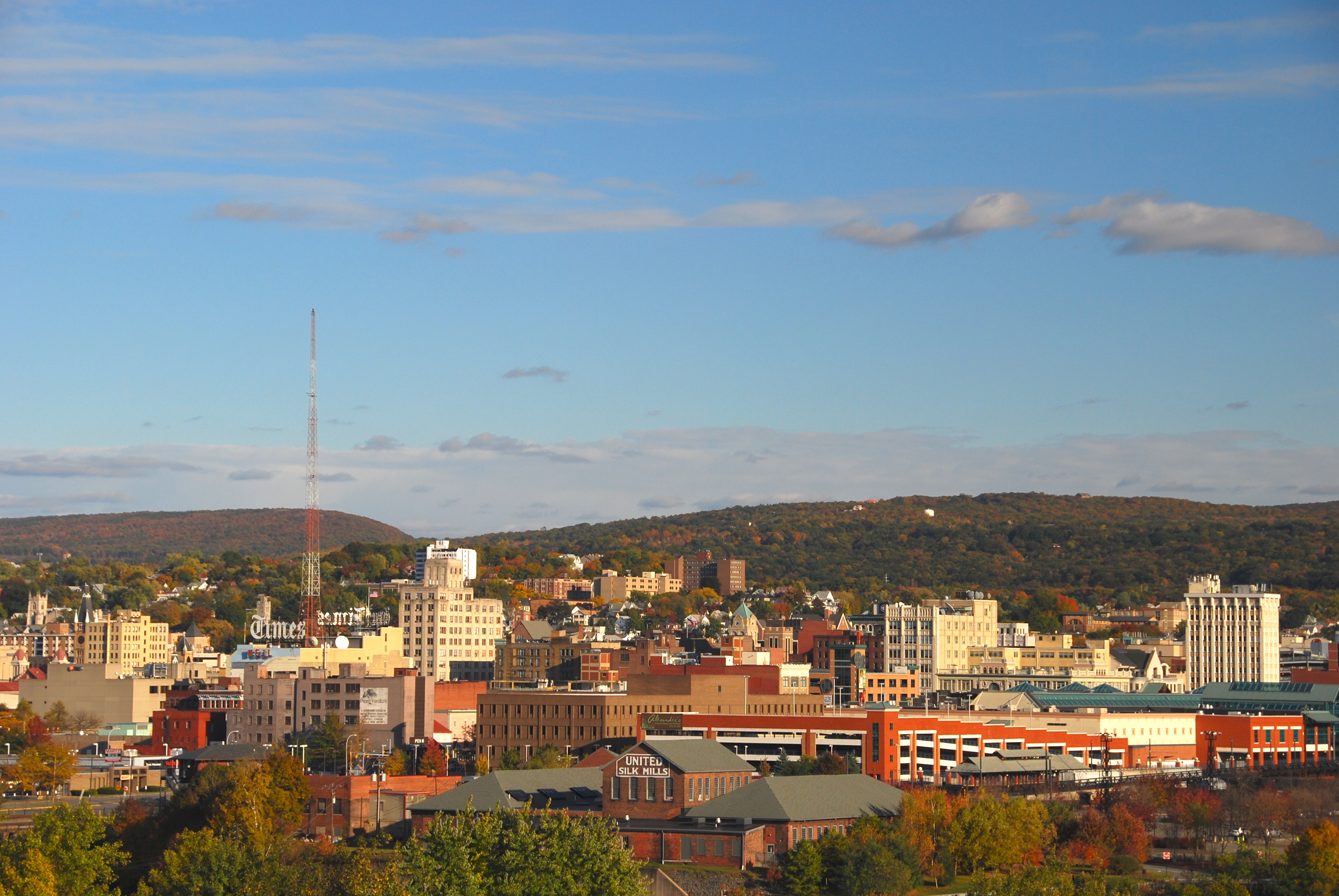
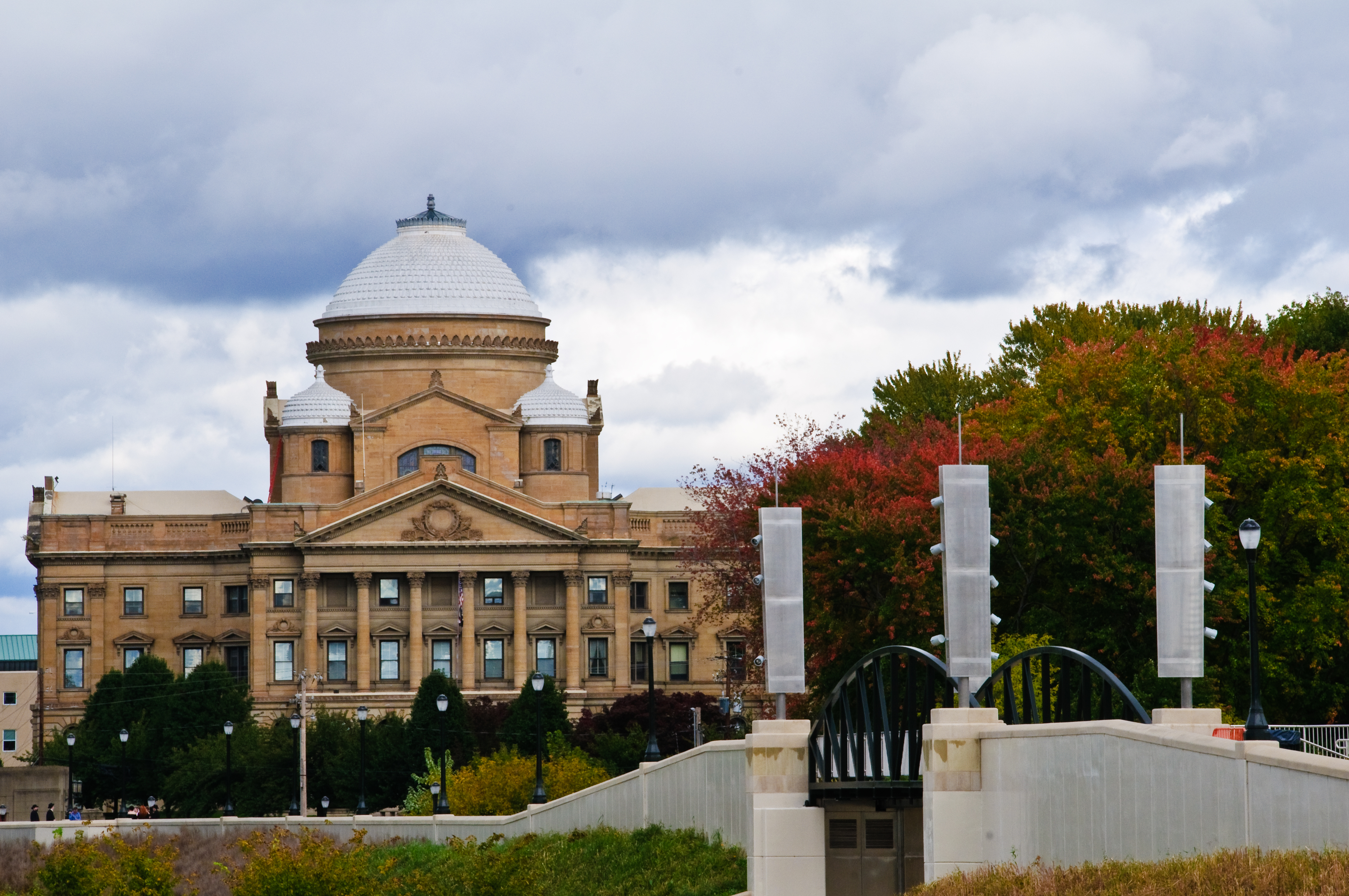
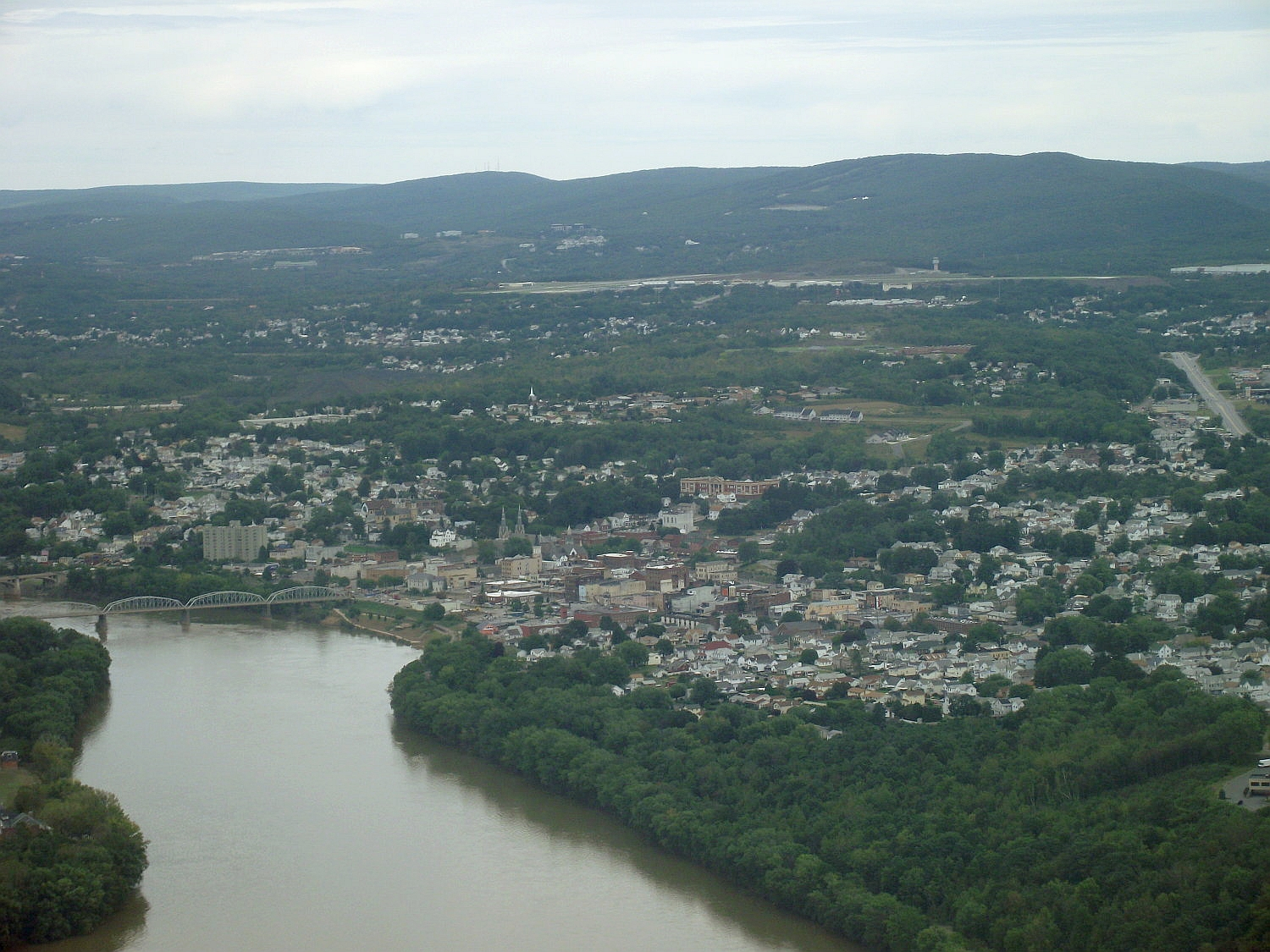
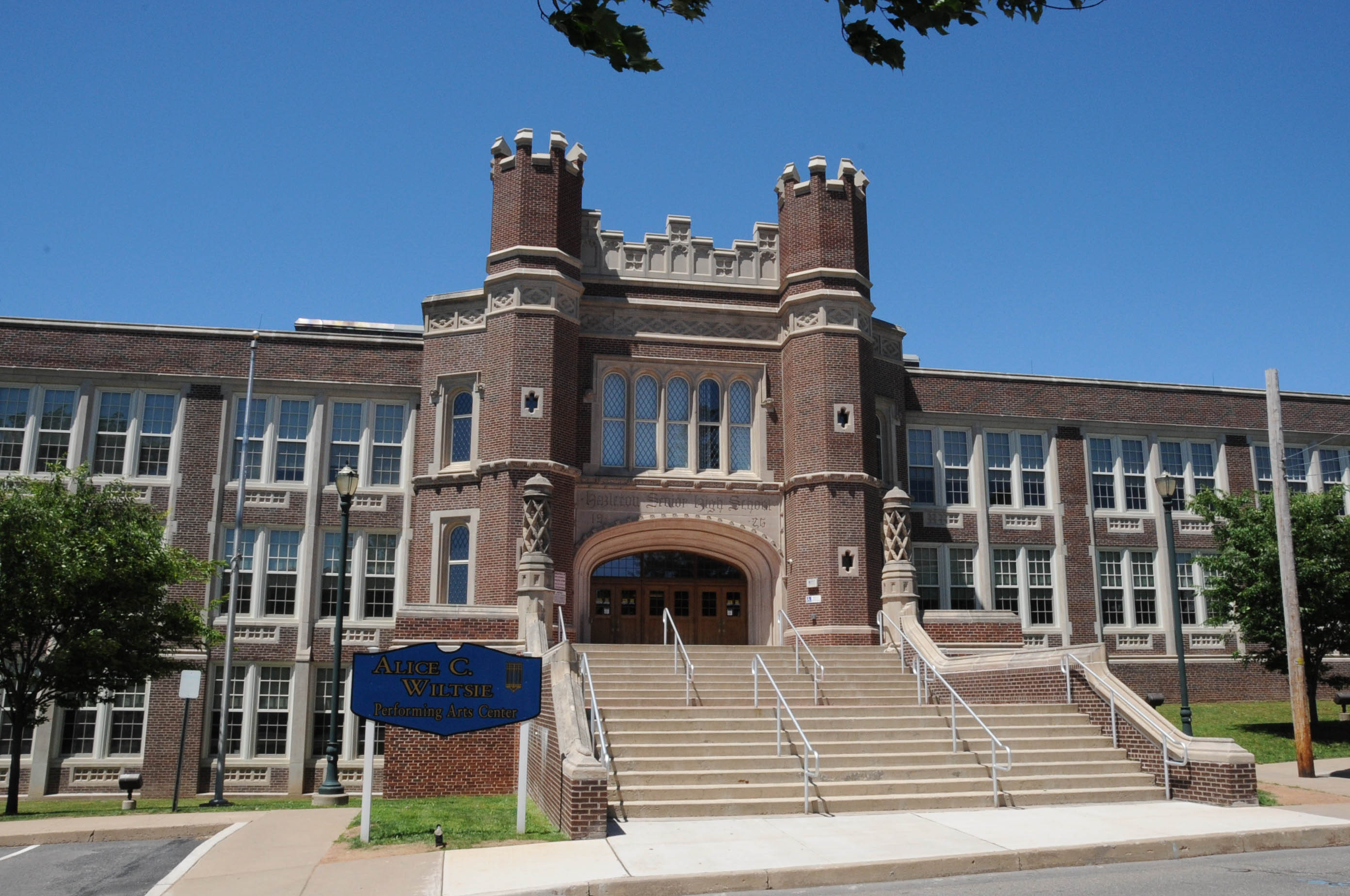
- Clockwise from top left: Scranton, Wilkes-Barre, Hazleton, and Greater Pittston

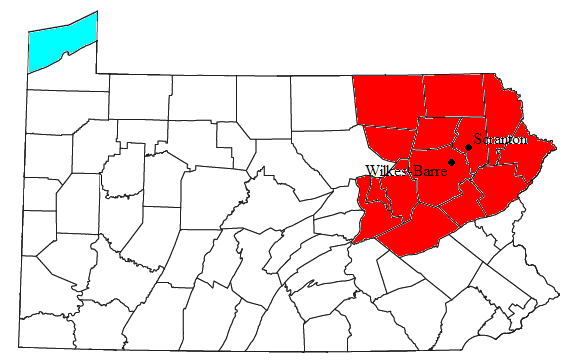
- Northeastern Pennsylvania
- Coordinates: 41.4468°N 75.4156°W
- Country: United States
- Commonwealth: Pennsylvania
- Largest city: Scranton
- Other cities (by population): List: In region: Wilkes-Barre; Hazleton; Bloomsburg; Pottsville; Dunmore; Kingston; East Stroudsburg; Hanover Township; Mountain Top; Berwick; Nanticoke; Sunbury; Shamokin; Pocono Township; Carbondale; Pittston (Greater Pittston)

Area
  - Total: 8,426 sq mi (21,820 km^{2})

Population (2010 estimate)
  - Total: 1,349,698
- Time zone: UTC−5 (ET)
  - Summer (DST): UTC−4 (EDT)

Northeastern Pennsylvania (NEPA or Nepa; sometimes pronounced /ˈniːpɑː/ NEE-pah) is a region of the U.S. state of Pennsylvania that includes the Pocono Mountains, and the industrial cities of the Wyoming Valley (Scranton, Wilkes-Barre, Pittston, Hazleton, Nanticoke, and Carbondale). A portion of this region is located in the New York City metropolitan area. Recently, Pennsylvania tourism boards have described Northeastern Pennsylvania as Upstate Pennsylvania.

Unlike most other parts of the Rust Belt, some of the communities are experiencing a modest population increase, and others, including Monroe and Pike counties, rank among the state's fastest growing counties.

Northeastern Pennsylvania borders the Pennsylvania Wilds to the west, the New York State Southern Tier and Hudson Valley regions to the north and northeast, Sussex and Warren counties in New Jersey to the east, and the Lehigh Valley to the south.

== Area ==
References to Northeastern Pennsylvania frequently include some combination of Bradford County, Carbon County, Columbia County, Lackawanna County, Luzerne County, Monroe County, Montour County, Northumberland County, Pike County, Schuylkill County, Sullivan County, Susquehanna County, Wayne County, and Wyoming County.

County	2020 Population	2010 Population	Area
Bradford County	59,967	62,622	1,161 sq mi (3,007 km2)
Carbon County	64,749	65,249	387 sq mi (1,002 km2)
Columbia County	64,727	67,295	490 sq mi (1,269 km2)
Lackawanna County	215,896	214,437	465 sq mi (1,204 km2)
Luzerne County	325,594	320,918	906 sq mi (2,350 km2)
Monroe County	168,327	169,842	617 sq mi (1,598 km2)
Montour County	18,136	18,267	132 sq mi (342 km2)
Northumberland County	91,647	94,528	478 sq mi (1,238 km2)
Pike County	58,535	57,369	567 sq mi (1,469 km2)
Schuylkill County	143,049	148,289	783 sq mi (2,028 km2)
Sullivan County	5,840	6,428	452 sq mi (1,171 km2)
Susquehanna County	38,434	43,356	832 sq mi (2,155 km2)
Wayne County	51,155	52,822	751 sq mi (1,945 km2)
Wyoming County	26,069	28,276	405 sq mi (1,049 km2)
Total	1,332,125	1,349,698	8,426 sq mi (21,823 km2)

Green: the largest county by area; Yellow: the most populous county

== Attractions and entertainment ==
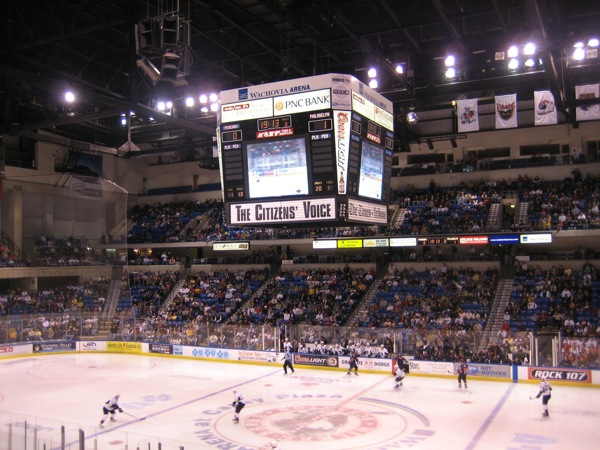
Mohegan Sun Arena in Wilkes-Barre Township

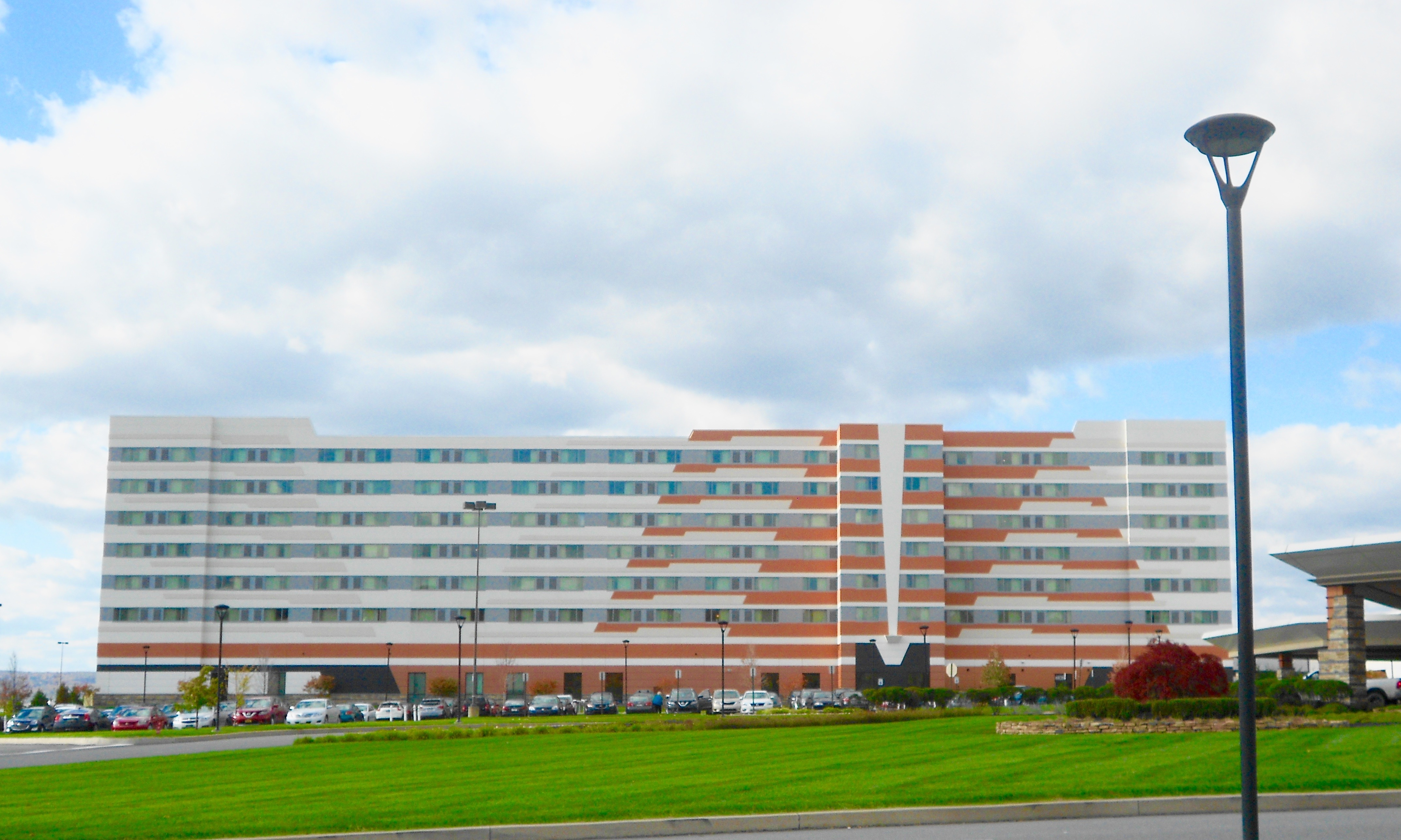
Mohegan Pennsylvania hotel and casino

Northeastern Pennsylvania is home to PNC Field in Moosic, which hosts the Scranton/Wilkes-Barre Highlanders, the AAA affiliate of Major League Baseball's New York Yankees. Mohegan Sun Arena at Casey Plaza in Wilkes-Barre hosts the American Hockey League's Wilkes-Barre/Scranton Penguins; it previously hosted the Wilkes-Barre/Scranton Pioneers of arena football.

Pocono Raceway in Long Pond holds one cup series NASCAR race annually.

Mohegan Pennsylvania in Plains was Pennsylvania's first casino to offer slots. Mount Airy Casino Resort in Mount Pocono also offers gambling.

Skiers can find several slopes in the area, including Shawnee on Delaware in East Stroudsburg, Blue Mountain Resort (east of Palmerton), Montage Mountain Ski Resort in Scranton, which also operates as a water park during the summer season, Elk Mountain in Union Dale, and Camelback Mountain Resort in Tannersville. Like Montage, it operates as a water park in the off season.

There are several attractions that explore the region's industrial history. Eckley Miners' Village near Hazleton, and the Lackawanna Coal Mine Tour in Scranton highlight the area's coal mining history, while Steamtown National Historic Site and the Electric City Trolley Museum, both in Scranton, focus on transportation history.

The Houdini Museum in Scranton follows Houdini's exploits in the area, as well as the rest of the world. The Scranton Ghost Walk attraction tells of Scranton's paranormal history. 1433 N. Main Avenue, home of the longest running seance event in the United States, "Haunted! Mysteries of the Beyond", was picked by the Pennsylvania Department of tourism as one of the most haunted places in the state.

== Education ==
=== Colleges and universities ===
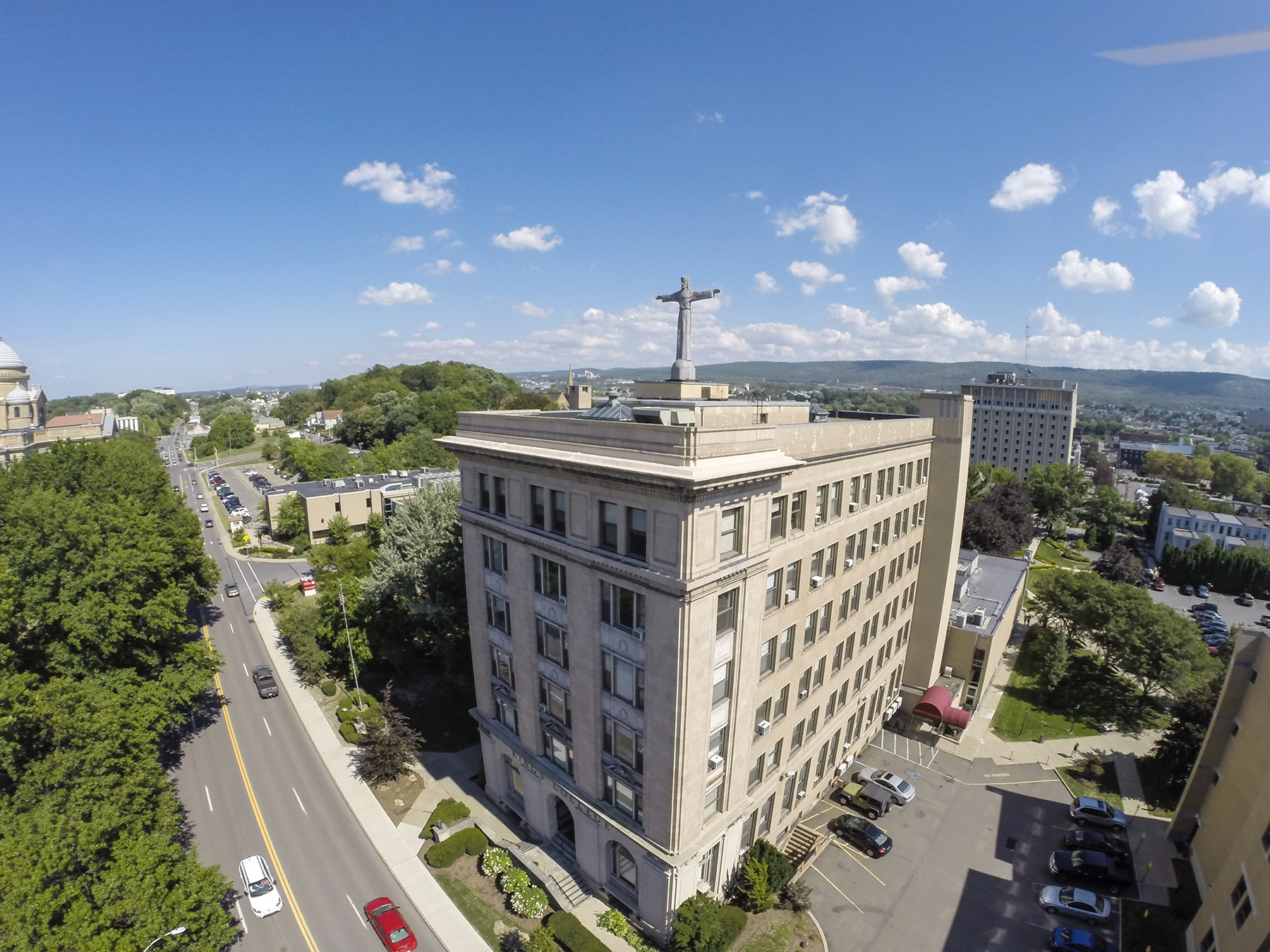
The administration building at King's College in Wilkes-Barre, Pennsylvania in February 2013

Many well-known universities are located in Northeastern Pennsylvania. Penn State operates campuses in the Wilkes-Barre area, near Scranton and in Hazleton. Colleges in the Scranton area include Marywood University in Dunmore, Lackawanna College in downtown Scranton, and the University of Scranton, in downtown Scranton. Geisinger Commonwealth School of Medicine is the region's only medical school and specifically recruits students from NEPA and surrounding counties.

Wilkes-Barre area colleges include Wilkes University in downtown Wilkes-Barre, King's College also in downtown Wilkes-Barre, Luzerne County Community College in Nanticoke, and Misericordia University in Dallas.

Keystone College in La Plume, St. Tikhon's Orthodox Theological Seminary in South Canaan Township, Clarks Summit University (formerly Baptist Bible College & Seminary) in Clarks Summit, Bloomsburg University in Bloomsburg, and East Stroudsburg University in East Stroudsburg are among the other colleges in the area.

=== Primary education ===
Three college preparatory schools are located in Northeastern Pennsylvania, including Wyoming Seminary in Kingston, Scranton Preparatory School in Scranton, and MMI Preparatory School in Freeland.

Seven Catholic high schools are located in Northeastern Pennsylvania. They include Holy Cross High School in Dunmore, which primarily serves Lackawanna County, Luzerne County, Wayne County, Pike County, Susquehanna County, Wyoming County, and Monroe County. The second school is Holy Redeemer High School in Wilkes-Barre, which serves primarily Luzerne County and Wyoming County. The third school is Notre Dame High School, which is located in Stroudsburg. It primarily serves Monroe County. The fourth school is Nativity BVM High School, which is located in Pottsville, which serves Schuylkill County. The fifth school is Marian Catholic High School in Tamaqua, which serves Schuylkill County, Luzerne County, and Carbon County. The sixth school is Our Lady of Lourdes Regional School, which is located near the city of Shamokin. The seventh school is St. Gregory the Great Academy, which is a boarding school for boys grades 9–12, specializing in classical education, and located in Elmhurst Township.

== Gallery ==
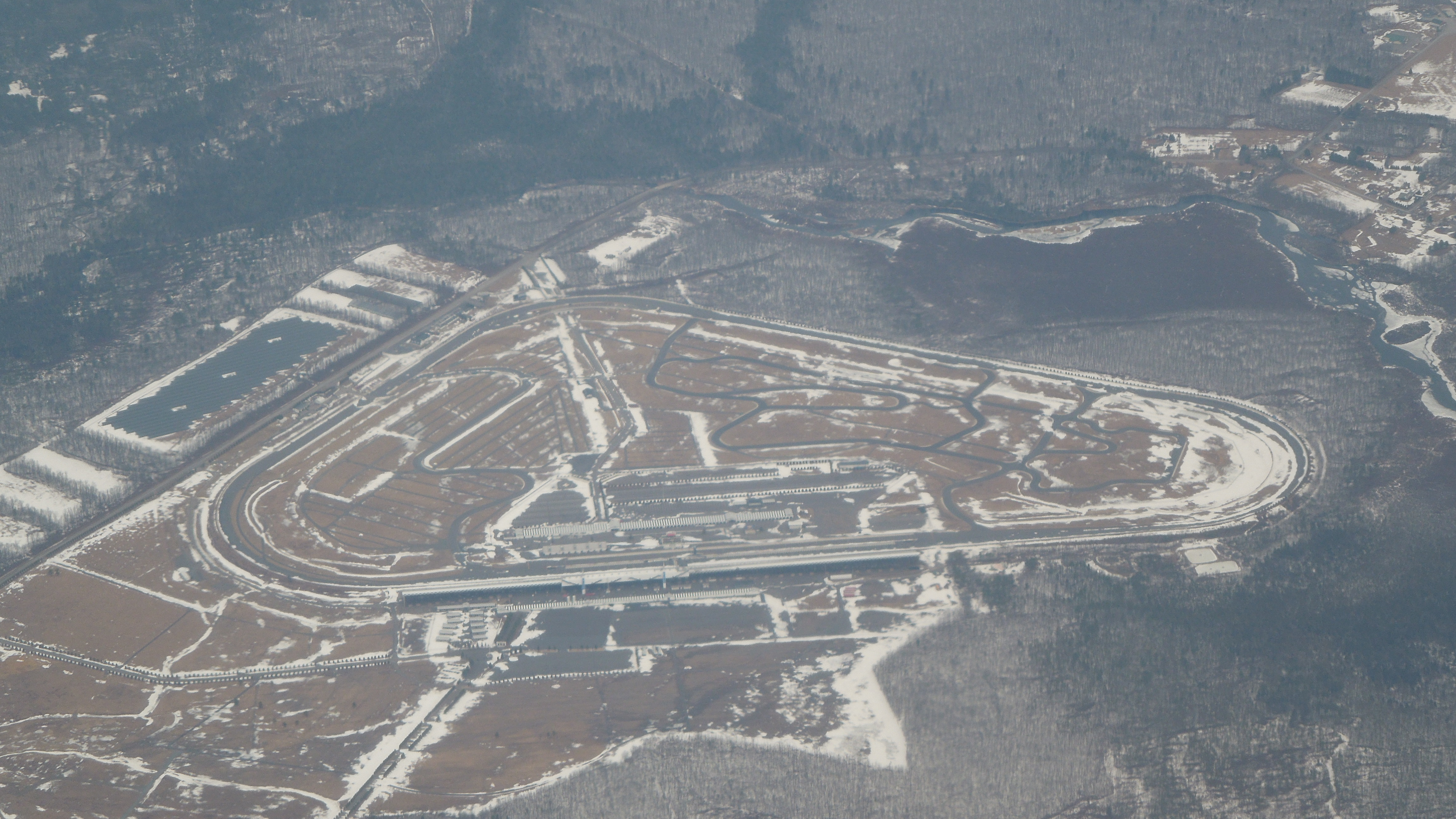
Aerial view of Pocono Raceway in Long Pond

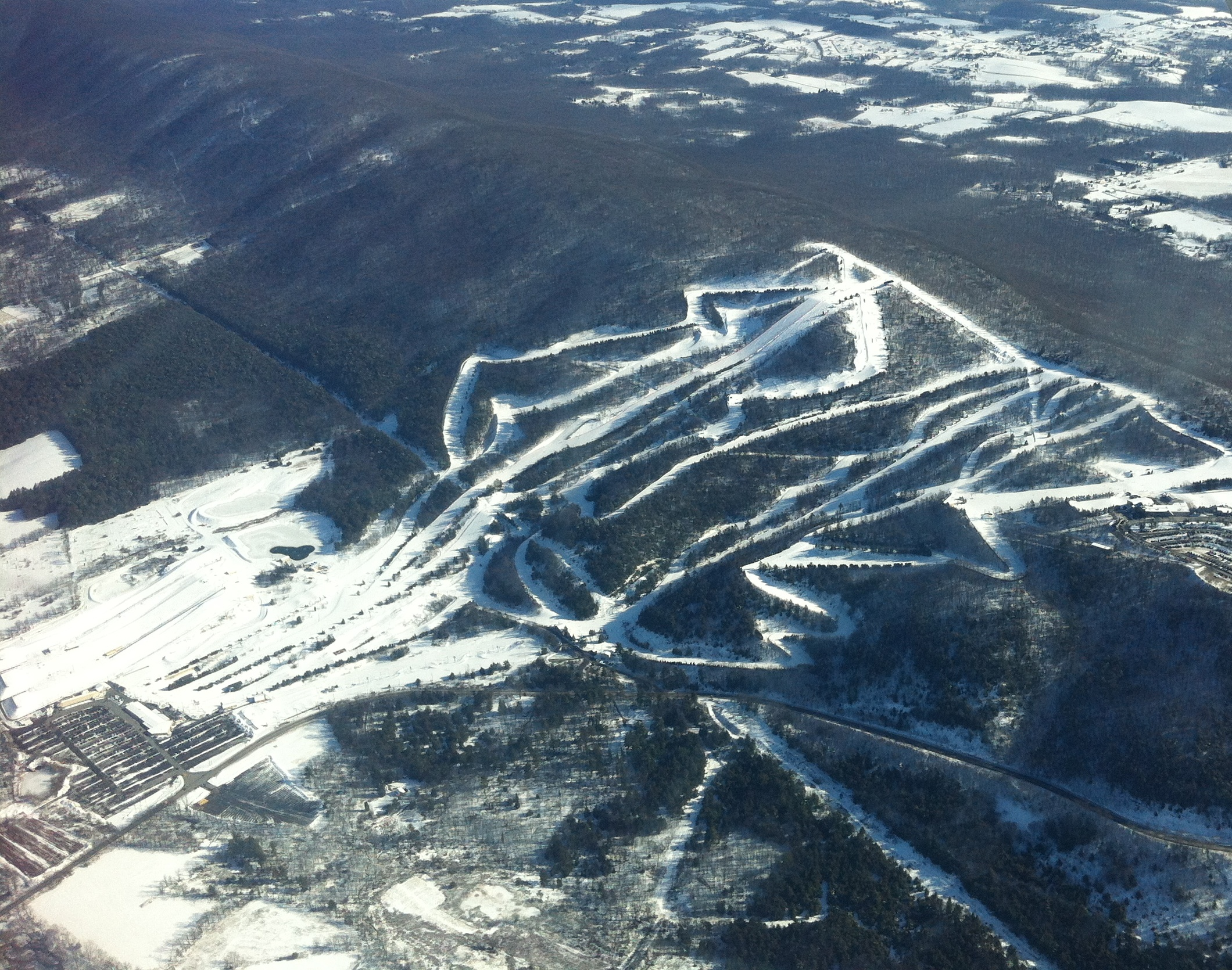
Aerial View of Blue Mountain Resort in Palmerton

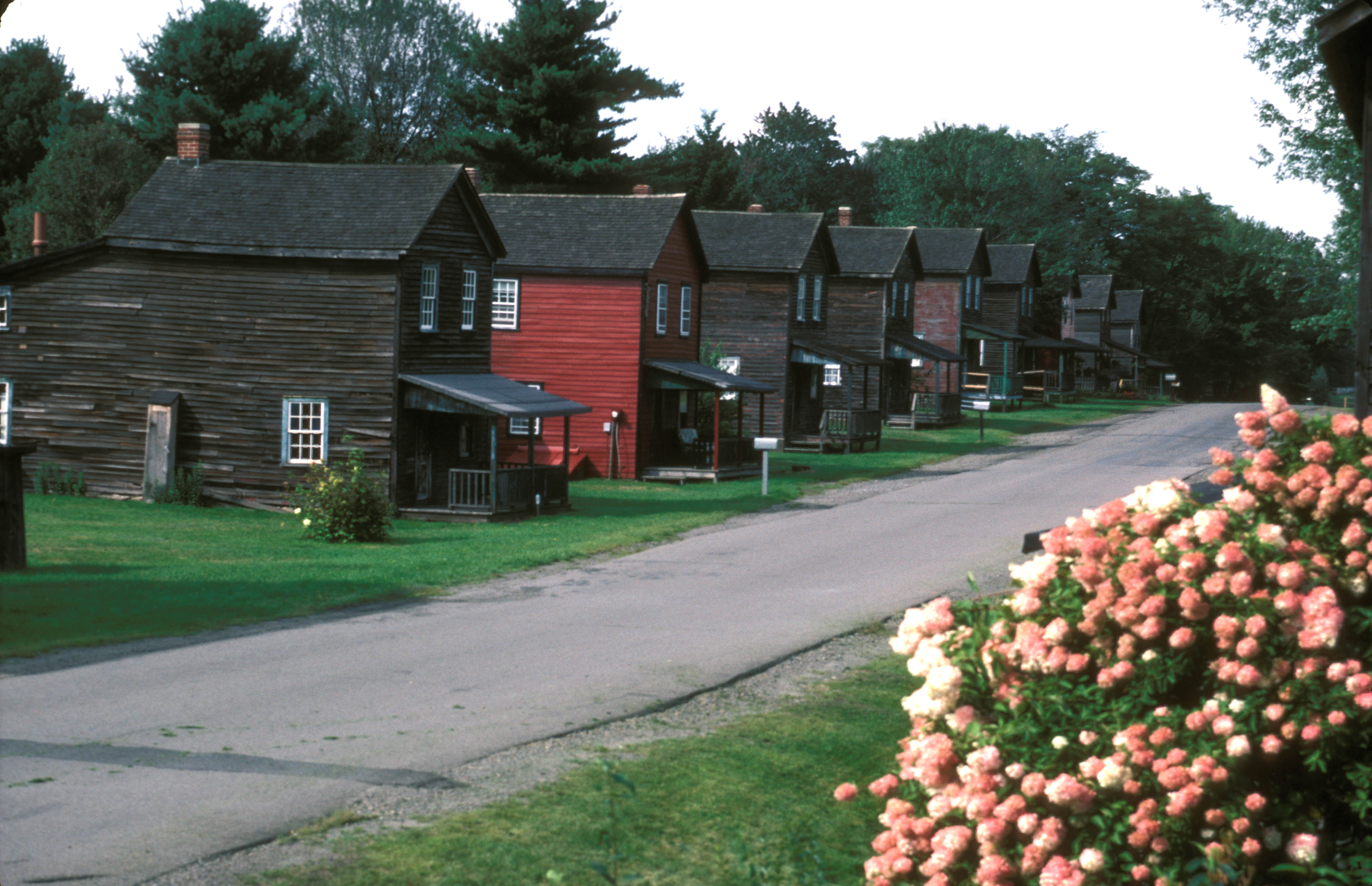
Eckley Miners' Village in Foster Township

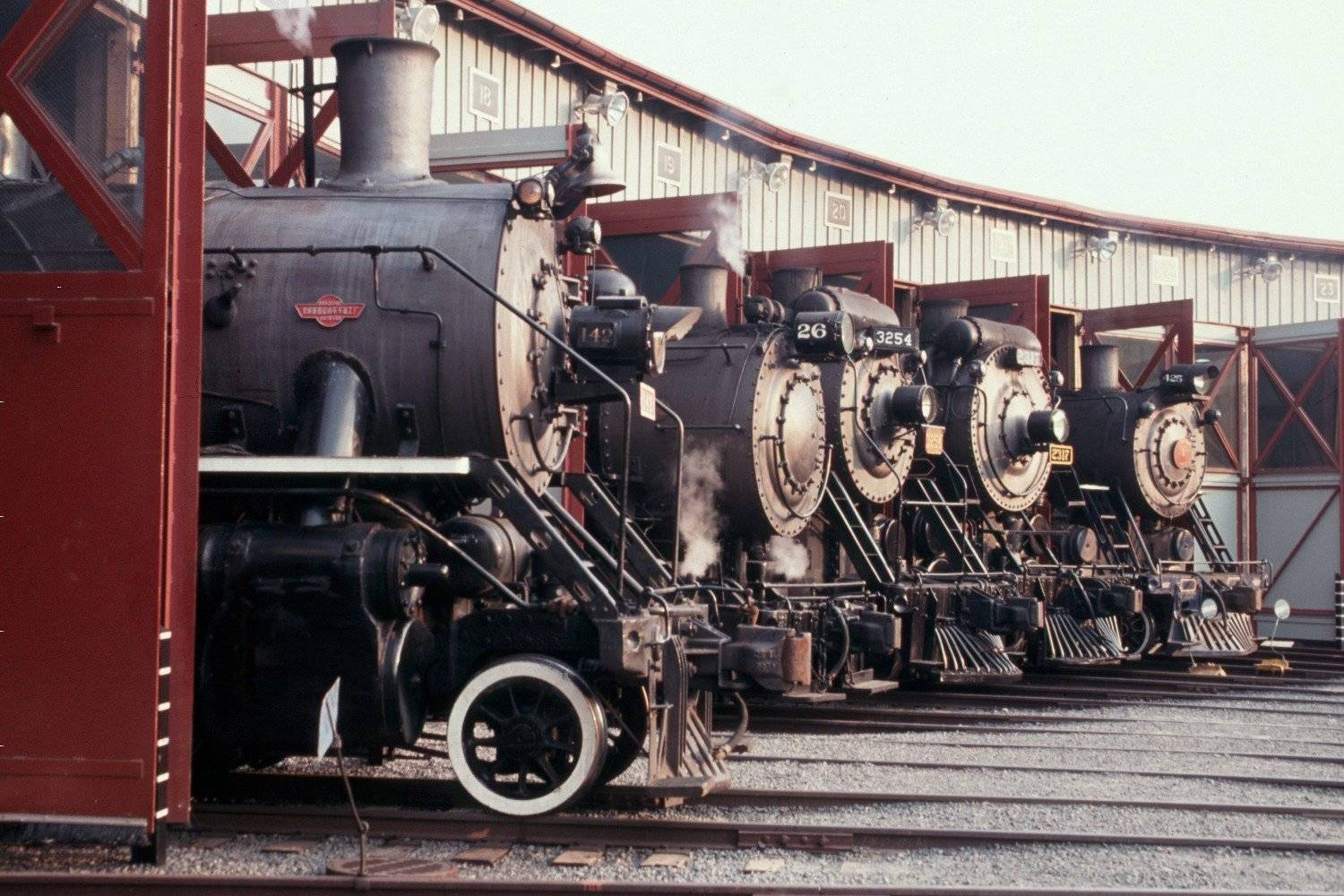
Steamtown National Historic Site in Scranton

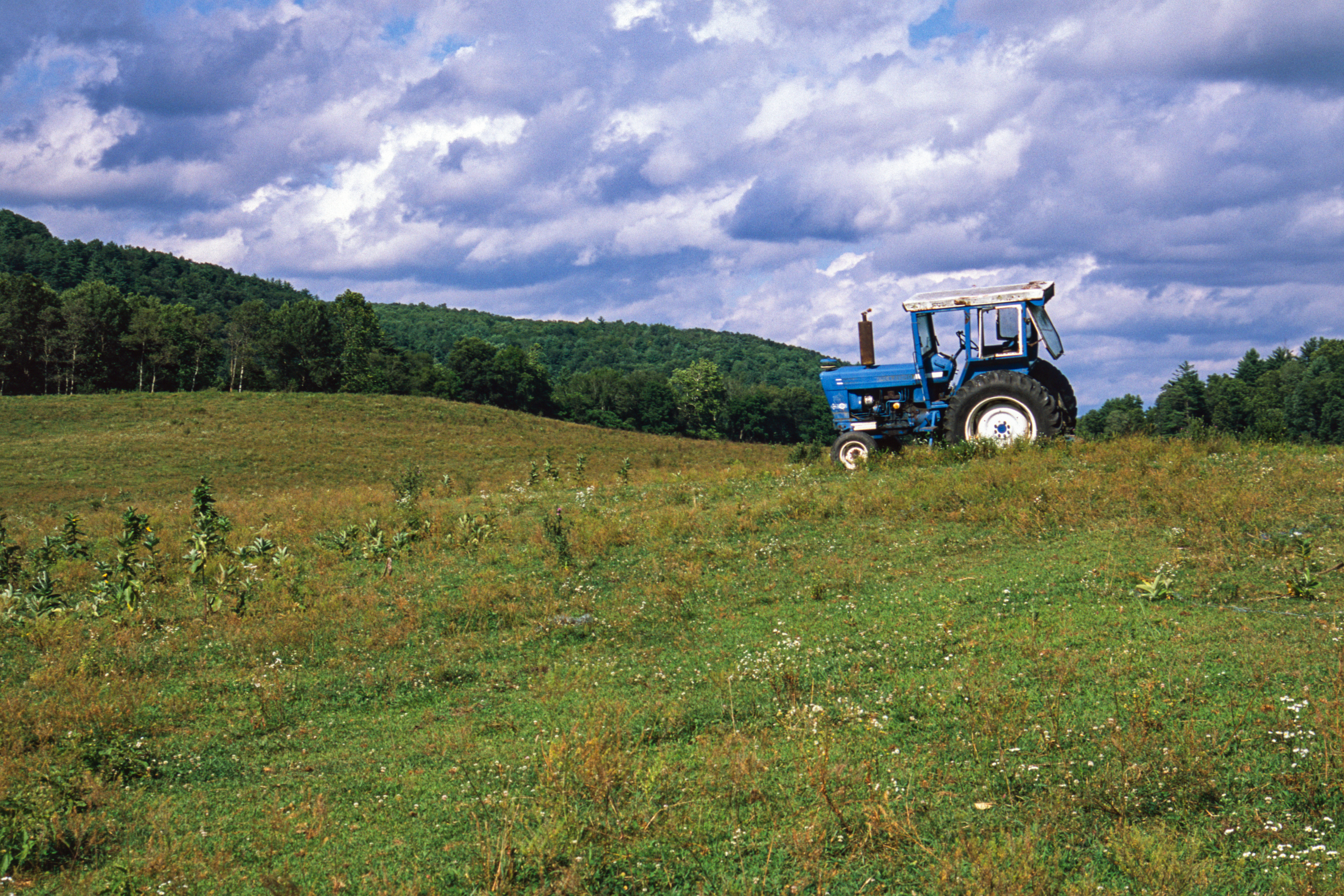
Idle tractor sitting in a field in Nicholson Township
