= Hickory Hills, Pennsylvania =

Unincorporated community in Pennsylvania, US

- Census-designated place
- Location in Pennsylvania Location in the United States
- Coordinates: 41°2′3″N 75°49′14″W
- Country: United States
- State: Pennsylvania
- County: Luzerne
- Township: Foster

Area
  - Total: 1.41 sq mi (3.66 km^{2})
  - Land: 1.40 sq mi (3.63 km^{2})
  - Water: 0.0077 sq mi (0.02 km^{2})

Population (2020)
  - Total: 624
  - Density: 444.6/sq mi (171.68/km^{2})
- Time zone: UTC-5 (Eastern (EST))
  - Summer (DST): UTC-4 (EDT)
- ZIP code: 18661
- Area codes: 570 and 272
- FIPS code: 42-34308

Hickory Hills is a census-designated place (CDP) in Foster Township, Luzerne County, Pennsylvania, United States, southwest of the borough of White Haven. The CDP population was 562 at the 2010 census.

== Geography ==
Hickory Hills is located at 41°2′3″N 75°49′14″W.

According to the United States Census Bureau, the CDP has a total area of 1.4 square miles (3.7 km^{2}), of which 1.4 square miles (3.6 km^{2}) is land and 0.008 square miles (0.02 km^{2}), or 0.57%, is water. PA 940 forms the northern edge of the CDP, connecting it with White Haven (to the northeast) and Freeland (to the southwest).

== Demographics ==
Historical population
| Census | Pop. | Note | %± |
|---|---|---|---|
| 2020 | 624 | | — |
U.S. Decennial Census

== Education ==
The school district is the Hazleton Area School District.
