= Asa Lansford Foster =

Pennsylvanian geologist, merchant, and coal mine owner (1798–1868)

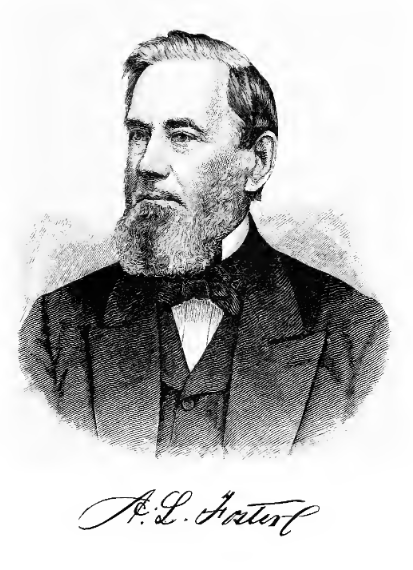
- Asa Lansford Foster
- Born: August 19, 1798; Massachusetts
- Died: January 9, 1868 (aged 69); Wilkes-Barre, Pennsylvania
- Known for: Helping to pioneer coal mining in Pennsylvania

Asa Lansford Foster (August 19, 1798 – January 9, 1868) was a Pennsylvanian geologist, merchant, and coal mine owner. He was also a geologist, mining engineer, and publisher and was one of the pioneers of the anthracite industry. He was a native of Massachusetts but immigrated to Pennsylvania in 1818. Foster married Louisa Trott Chapman.

== Early life ==
Foster was born on August 19, 1798 in Massachusetts. He received a common school education. In 1818, he immigrated to Pennsylvania from Rowe, Massachusetts.

== Coal mining ==
Between 1827 and 1834, Foster worked for the Lehigh Coal Company. He frequently studied the geology of coal formations and became an expert in that field. Foster was among the leading experts on the geology of the Coal Region. After 1837, Foster founded the Buck Mountain Coal Company, of which he was a superintendent and significant stockholder. The coal company opened in 1838. Foster then constructed wharves, tunnels, inclined planes, and a four-mile railroad for the purpose of transporting the coal of the Buck Mountain Coal Company to a canal near Rockport. In the autumn of 1840 the coal company started to ship anthracite. The company was initially successful, but failed in the winter of 1841. After the Buck Mountain Coal Company failed, Foster became the financial manager for Daniel Bertsch, an early mine operator. He also conducted the Council Ridge Colliery's mining and made a profit from it. One of the first tunnels in the Panther Creek valley was driven by Foster. He helped develop a number of other mining operations in the Panther Valley and aided in the development of a stove to efficiently burn anthracite.

== Other work ==
After coming to Pennsylvania, Foster became involved in the mercantile industry in Bloomsburg and Berwick with his brother. In 1826 Foster ceased his work in this industry and moved to Philadelphia. There he temporarily received a position in a wholesale house. In 1827 he moved to the community of Mauch Chunk (now Jim Thorpe). Upon arriving there, Foster established a store which became a supply point for much of the area between the Susquehanna and Delaware Rivers. He sold the store in 1837. Foster founded Mauch Chunk's first newspaper in 1829. It was called the Lehigh Pioneer and Mauch Chunk Courier, but later renamed Mauch Chunk Courier and was for a long time the only newspaper in the Lehigh Valley. He sold the newspaper in 1842. Foster co-founded the community of Eckley Miners' Village.

== Personal life ==
Foster married Louisa Trott Chapman on August 24, 1822, in Wilkes-Barre. He had six children. They were Thomas Lansford Foster (born 1823) and Charles Edward Foster (born 1826), Mary Chapman Foster (born 1829), Elizabeth Reed Foster (born 1832), Louisa Foster (born 1835), and Marion Foster (born 1836). Thomas Lansford Foster and Charles Edward Foster were born in Bloomsburg. His life was consistently lived in a Christian way. He served as a communicant for the Protestant Episcopal Church. Foster supported the Federalist, Whig, and then the Republican political parties. He was also a good swimmer. Foster was a supporter of public schools.

In 1992, his Great Granddaughter, Katharine Foster Thompson self-published Chapter and Verse; The Annotated Diaries Of Asa Lansford Foster (1798 - 1868). The original diaries were donated to the Museum at Eckley after the book was published.

== Death and legacy ==
Foster died in Wilkes-Barre, Pennsylvania, on January 9, 1868, at the age of 69, while visiting his friends. He was buried in the cemetery at Jim Thorpe, Pennsylvania. The Pennsylvania community of Lansford is named after Foster. Foster Township, in Luzerne County, Pennsylvania, is also named for him.

== See also ==
- Calvin Pardee
