= Freeland, Pennsylvania =

Borough in Pennsylvania, US

- Borough
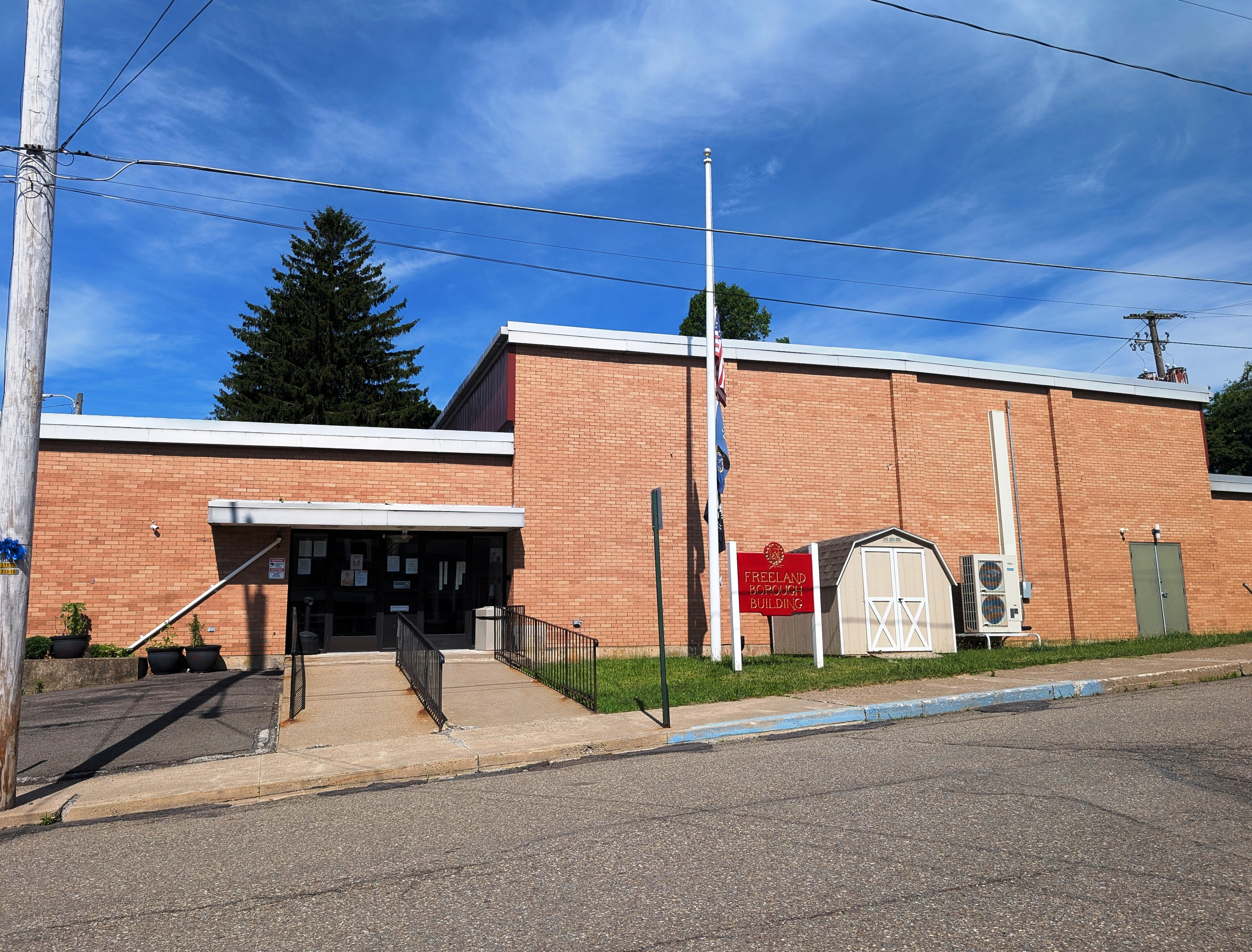
- Freeland Borough Building
- Nickname: Freeport
- Location of Freeland in Luzerne County, Pennsylvania

- Location within Pennsylvania Location within the United States
- Coordinates: 41°01′11″N 75°53′45″W
- Country: United States
- State: Pennsylvania
- County: Luzerne
- Settled: 1844
- Incorporated: 1876

Government
  - Type: Borough Council
  - Mayor: Joseph Palko Sr

Area
  - Total: 0.68 sq mi (1.75 km^{2})
  - Land: 0.68 sq mi (1.75 km^{2})
  - Water: 0 sq mi (0.00 km^{2})
- Elevation: 1,943 ft (592 m)

Population (2020)
  - Total: 3,833
  - Density: 5,676.7/sq mi (2,191.78/km^{2})
- Time zone: UTC-5 (Eastern (EST))
  - Summer (DST): UTC-4 (EDT)
- ZIP code: 18224
- Area code: 570
- FIPS code: 42-27744
- Website: freelandpa.gov

Freeland is a borough in Luzerne County, Pennsylvania, United States. It was originally called Birbeckville, South Heberton, and Freehold. Freeland is 18 miles (29 km) south of Wilkes-Barre and 10 miles (16 km) northeast of Hazleton. It was incorporated as a borough on September 11, 1876. Coal mining was the chief industry in the community through the mid-20th century. As of the 2020 census, the population was 3,833.

== History ==
=== Establishment ===
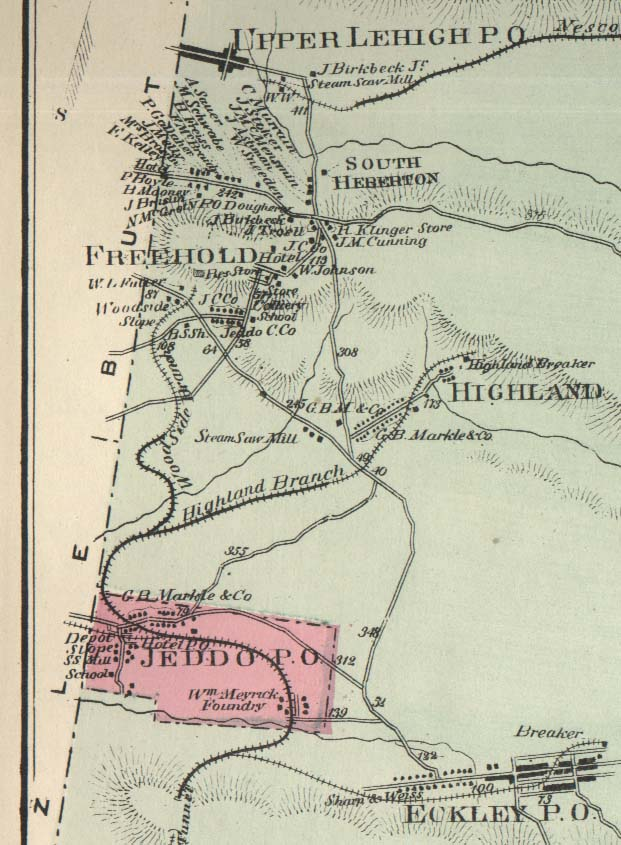
1873 map of Foster Township (Freehold and South Heberton merged to create modern-day Freeland)

Joseph Birkbeck, the founder of Freeland, was born near Brough, in the county of Westmorland, England, on May 2, 1802. He and his wife Elizabeth came to America in 1844. After acquiring land from Edward Lynch the same year of his arrival, Birkbeck built a log cabin in a small valley between modern-day Freeland and Upper Lehigh. The next settler, Nathan Howey, purchased land from Birkbeck and built a frame house just west of Birkbeck's log cabin.

=== Coal mining ===
Developing coal mines in the nearby region created a steep increase in population and a demand for building lots. This led Birkbeck to survey the region for the town of South Heberton. South Heberton has long since lost its identity and is now simply a cluster of houses along Schwabe Street, which is now part of Freeland.

Between 1845 and 1846, Birkbeck built a highway through South Heberton, Eckley Miners' Village, and Buck Mountain; it was known as Buck Mountain Road. Eckley was then known as Shingletown, as the chief industry there was the production of shingles.

The first child born at South Heberton was Elizabeth Birkbeck, the daughter of founder Joseph Birkbeck and his wife Elizabeth, in 1845. The first death at this place was that of William, the son of Joseph and Elizabeth Birkbeck, which occurred February 11, 1846. He was four years old at the time. The first store at South Heberton was owned by a man named Feist. It was located west of Birkbeck's cabin. The first tavern was founded by Nathan Howey, the second settler in the region. Prior to the opening of Howey's tavern, Birkbeck accommodated parties, who were prospecting for anthracite deposits, in his own home.

=== Incorporation ===
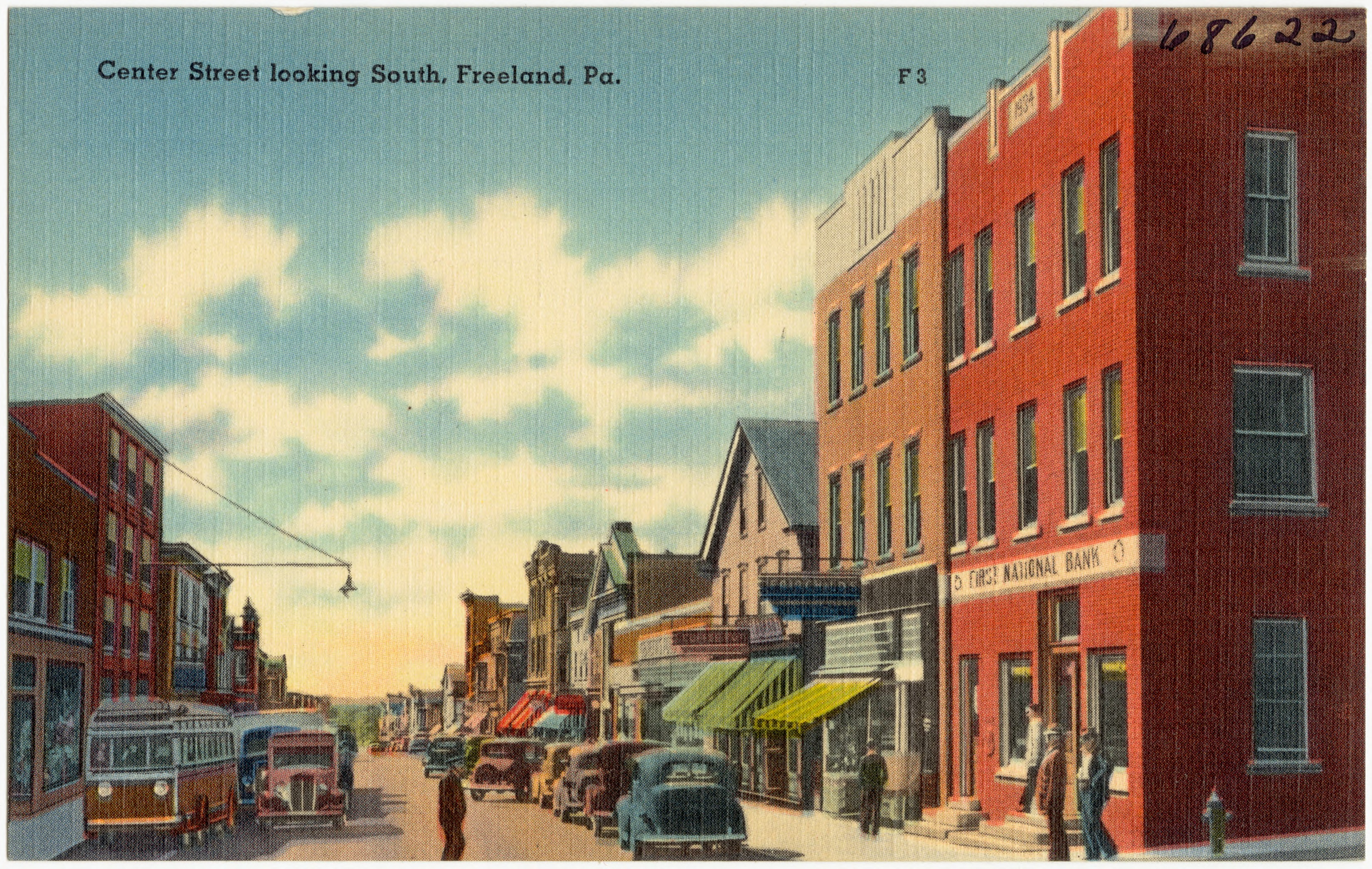
An old postcard of Freeland

Freehold and South Heberton merged to create modern-day Freeland. Freeland was incorporated as a borough on September 11, 1876. Two years later, in 1878, a frame school was built in the town. By 1880, the population of the community surpassed 600. In 1883, the first Slovak Lutheran Church in America was organized in Freeland. The population steadily increased due to the expanding coal mining industry in the region. Many Europeans immigrated to Freeland up until the mid-20th century.

=== Present day ===
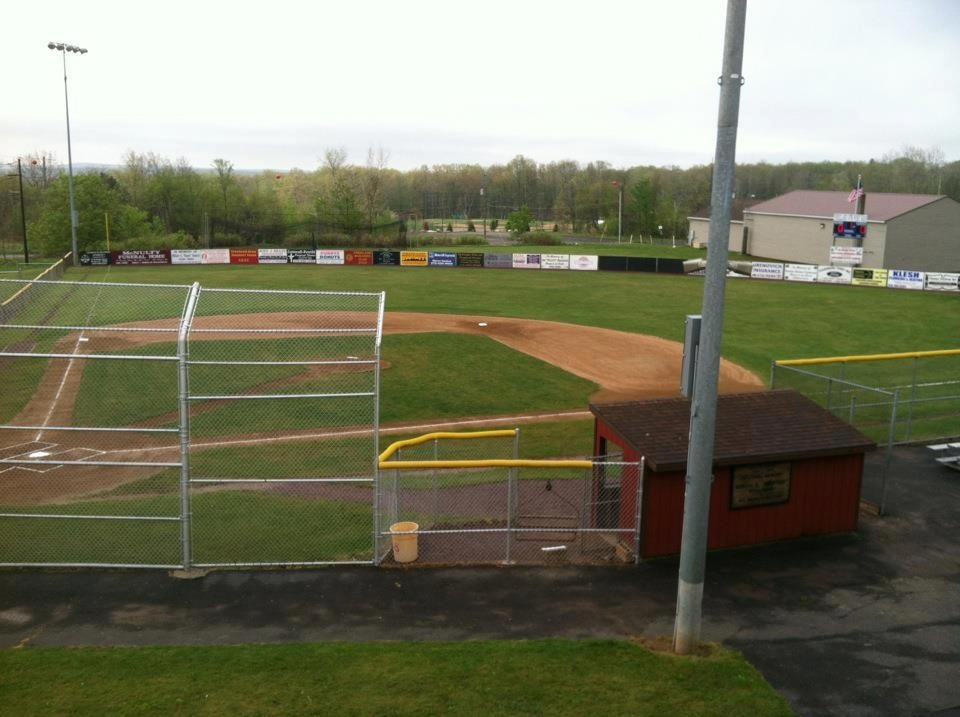
Little League field in Freeland

The coal mining industry in and around Freeland collapsed after the 1959 Knox Mine Disaster in northern Luzerne County. As of 2017, Freeland had a YMCA program, a community park, the Hazleton Area Public Library (Freeland Branch), and a remodeled Little League field. Also, there is a football/baseball field named "Della Croce Field," after the former Director of the Freeland YMCA.

=== Customs ===
Since a large demographic of people in Freeland are of Irish descent, every year, there is a St. Patrick's Day parade through downtown, which is followed by a dinner. There are also annual events for Memorial Day and Veterans Day, due to the large number of retired and active duty soldiers living in the surrounding communities. As part of the Memorial Day celebration, an annual Pub Run takes place, in which participants run a course with bars along the way. Participants must stop and finish a drink at each bar before continuing the race. The race usually consists of nine bars throughout the borough, as well as some that do not technically fall within the municipal entity.

== Geography ==
Freeland is located 18 mi (29 km) south of Wilkes-Barre and 10 mi (16 km) northeast of Hazleton (in an agricultural region).

According to the United States Census Bureau, the borough has a total area of 0.66 square miles (1.7 km^{2}), all land. Foster Township completely encircles the borough. Pennsylvania Route 940 runs through Freeland; it provides a direct link to Hazleton and White Haven. The closest airport is Hazleton Regional Airport, which is a public airport two miles northwest of Hazleton City.

=== Climate ===
The Köppen Climate Classification subtype for this climate is "Dfb" (Warm Summer Continental Climate).

Climate data for Freeland, Pennsylvania
Month	Jan	Feb	Mar	Apr	May	Jun	Jul	Aug	Sep	Oct	Nov	Dec	Year
Mean daily maximum °F (°C)	29 (−2)	32 (0)	39 (4)	50 (10)	65 (18)	73 (23)	78 (26)	75 (24)	67 (19)	57 (14)	41 (5)	33 (1)	51 (11)
Mean daily minimum °F (°C)	13 (−11)	17 (−8)	24 (−4)	33 (1)	44 (7)	53 (12)	59 (15)	57 (14)	50 (10)	39 (4)	32 (0)	21 (−6)	37 (3)
Average precipitation inches (cm)	3 (7.6)	2.9 (7.4)	3.5 (8.9)	4.1 (10)	4.4 (11)	4.6 (12)	5 (13)	4.3 (11)	4 (10)	3.7 (9.4)	4 (10)	3.5 (8.9)	47.1 (120)
Source: Weatherbase

== Government ==
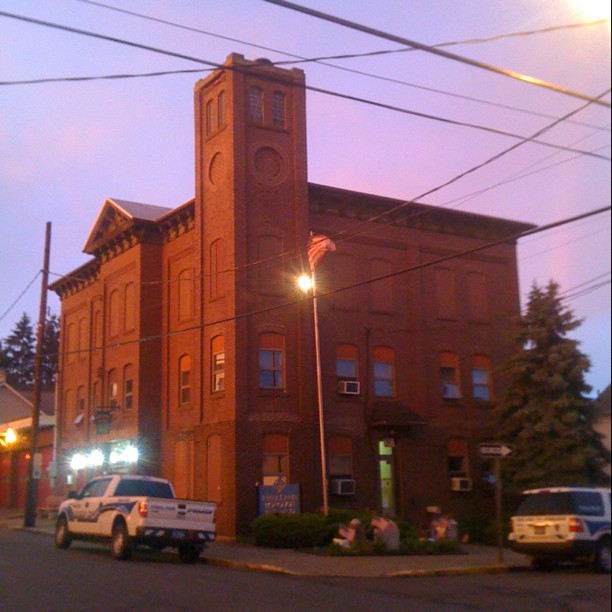
Former borough building

The borough government consists of a mayor and a seven-member borough council. The current mayor of Freeland is Joseph Palko Sr.

== Education ==
Freeland is part of the Hazleton Area School District. Elementary and middle school students attend Freeland Elementary/Middle School. MMI Preparatory School, a college preparatory school for grades 6–12, is also located in Freeland.

== Demographics ==
Historical population
Census	Pop.	Note	%±
1880	624		—
1890	1,730		177.2%
1900	5,254		203.7%
1910	6,197		17.9%
1920	6,666		7.6%
1930	7,098		6.5%
1940	6,593		−7.1%
1950	5,909		−10.4%
1960	5,068		−14.2%
1970	4,784		−5.6%
1980	4,285		−10.4%
1990	3,909		−8.8%
2000	3,643		−6.8%
2010	3,531		−3.1%
2020	3,833		8.6%

=== 2020 census ===
As of the 2020 census, Freeland had a population of 3,833. The median age was 37.9 years. 24.7% of residents were under the age of 18 and 16.9% of residents were 65 years of age or older. For every 100 females there were 96.1 males, and for every 100 females age 18 and over there were 93.2 males age 18 and over.

100.0% of residents lived in urban areas, while 0.0% lived in rural areas.

There were 1,610 households in Freeland, of which 30.5% had children under the age of 18 living in them. Of all households, 34.2% were married-couple households, 23.8% were households with a male householder and no spouse or partner present, and 33.1% were households with a female householder and no spouse or partner present. About 34.4% of all households were made up of individuals and 15.0% had someone living alone who was 65 years of age or older.

There were 1,824 housing units, of which 11.7% were vacant. The homeowner vacancy rate was 3.5% and the rental vacancy rate was 5.8%.

Racial composition as of the 2020 census
Race	Number	Percent
White	2,840	74.1%
Black or African American	80	2.1%
American Indian and Alaska Native	3	0.1%
Asian	30	0.8%
Native Hawaiian and Other Pacific Islander	0	0.0%
Some other race	523	13.6%
Two or more races	357	9.3%
Hispanic or Latino (of any race)	882	23.0%

=== 2010 census ===
As of the census of 2010, there were 3,531 people living in the borough, a decrease of 3.3% since the 2000 census. There were 1,760 housing units. The racial makeup of the borough was 95.78% White, 0.59% African American, 0.11% Native American, 0.54% Asian American, 1.53% from other races, and 1.44% mixed race. Hispanic or Latino Americans of any race were 5.81% of the population.

As of the 2010 Census, the population was spread out, with 23.22% under the age of 18, 5.83% from 20 to 24, 12.55% from 25 to 34, 19.12% from 35 to 49, 18.38% from 50 to 64, and 18.75% who were 65 years of age or older. As of 2010, for every 100 females there were 92.95 males.

=== 2000 census ===
The main ancestries reported by white Freeland residents on the 2000 Census were Italian (17.5%), Polish (13.0%), Irish (12.3%), German (7.7%), and Slovak (6.6%).

There were 1,611 households, as of the 2000 Census, out of which 23.6% had children under the age of 18 living with them, 42.5% were married couples living together, 12.5% had a female householder with no husband present, and 39.9% were non-families. 37.1% of all households were made up of individuals, and 20.6% had someone living alone who was 65 years of age or older. The average household size in 2000 was 2.26 and the average family size was 2.96.

The median age in 2000 was 42 years. In 2000, for every 100 females age 18 and over, there were 82.7 males.

According to the Census of 2000, the median income for a household in the borough was $31,891, and the median income for a family was $40,863. Males had a median income of $31,631 versus $21,471 for females. The per capita income for the borough was $15,701. About 11.3% of families and 13.0% of the population were below the poverty line, including 18.6% of those under age 18 and 17.0% of those age 65 or over.

== Notable person ==
- Basil Schott, Byzantine Catholic bishop
- Raymond E. Schultz, founder of Hampton Inn hotels and former CEO of Promus Hotel Corporation
