= The Molly Maguires =

1970 film by Martin Ritt

- U.S. film poster
- Directed by: Martin Ritt
- Written by: Walter Bernstein
- Based on: Lament for the Molly Maguires by Arthur H. Lewis
- Produced by: Martin Ritt; Walter Bernstein
- Starring: Sean Connery; Richard Harris; Samantha Eggar; Frank Finlay
- Cinematography: James Wong Howe
- Edited by: Frank Bracht
- Music by: Henry Mancini
- Production company: Tamm Productions
- Distributed by: Paramount Pictures
- Release date: January 28, 1970
- Running time: 124 minutes
- Country: United States
- Language: English
- Budget: $11 million
- Box office: $2,200,000 (US)

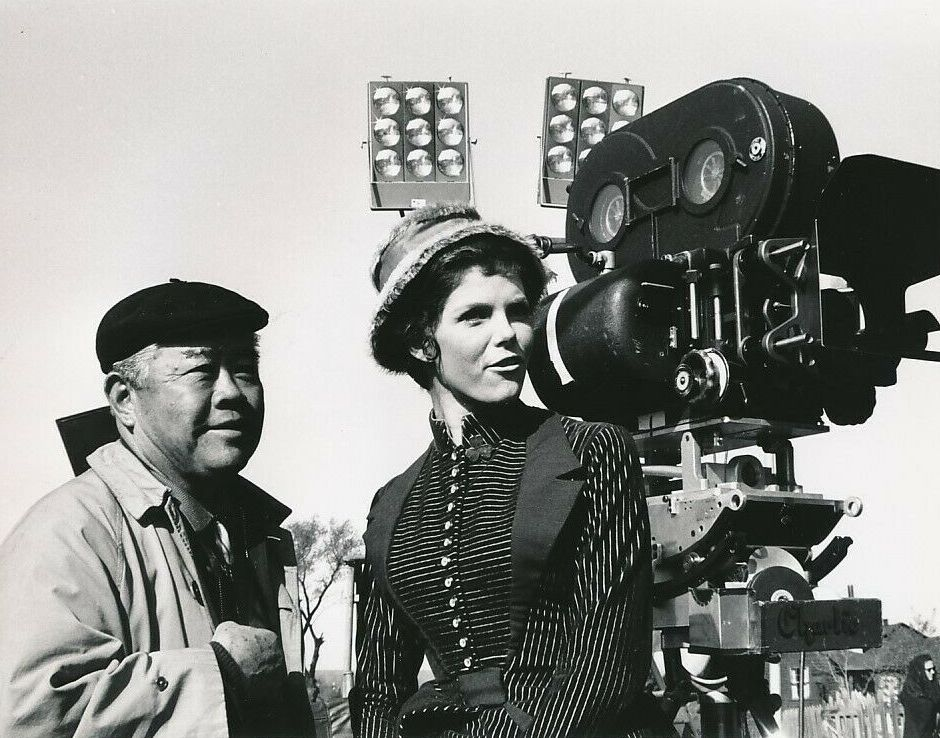
James Wong Howe and Samantha Eggar on set of The Molly Maguires

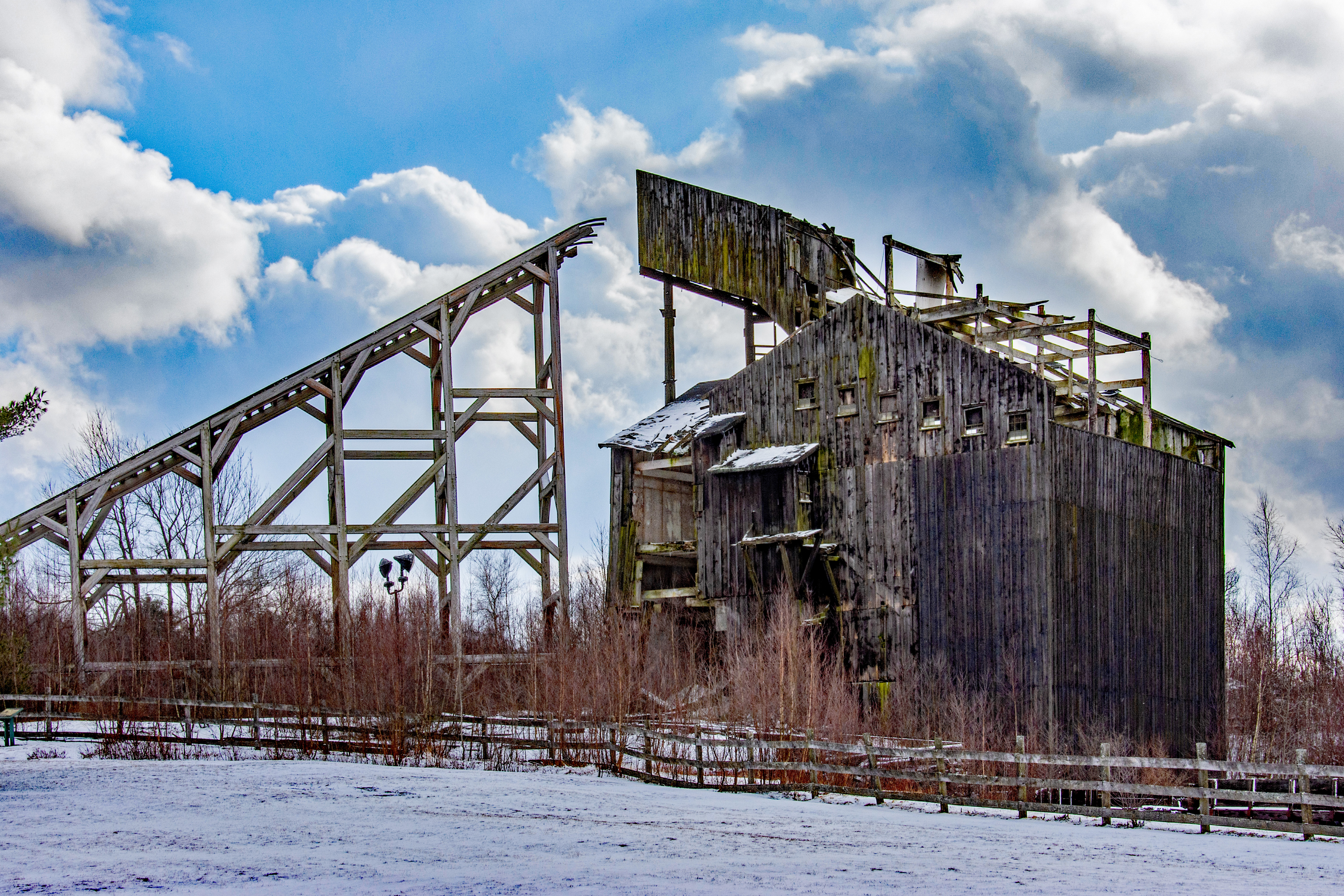
Coal cracker in Eckley Miners' Village, a prop for The Molly Maguires

The Molly Maguires is a 1970 American historical crime drama film directed and produced by Martin Ritt, and starring Sean Connery, Richard Harris, Samantha Eggar, and Frank Finlay. Set in late 19th century Pennsylvania, this social drama tells the story of an undercover detective sent to a coal mining community to expose the Molly Maguires, a secret society of Irish-American miners battling exploitation at the hand of the owners. The screenplay is based on the 1964 book Lament for the Molly Maguires by journalist Arthur H. Lewis.

The film was released by Paramount Pictures on January 28, 1970. It was well-received by critics but was a commercial failure. At the 43rd Academy Awards, the film was nominated for Best Art Direction.

== Plot ==
In a coalmine in Carbon County, Pennsylvania in 1876, coal is still dug by hand and taken out on rails in wagons pulled by ponies. Pit props are improvised with timber. Conditions are always dirty, often cramped and generally unhealthy. Miners are shown with naked flames on their hats as their only light source. Men are shown planting charges. This appears to be work-related but all men leave the mine and the resultant explosion destroys the mine.

Allan Pinkerton sends Irish immigrant James McParlan to investigate. He arrives by train in the late evening and goes to the town's local pub and orders a beer, while Jack Kehoe, the Molly Maguires' leader, observes and motions for two of his men, Dougherty and Frazier, to deal with the matter. McParlan joins Dougherty and Frazier at a card table and says he is looking for work in the mine. They are suspicious and see his hands have never dug coal. They accuse him of cheating and deliberately start a fight. Police Captain Davies, a Welshman, breaks up the fight and arrests McParlan. However, this is just a ploy as the police know McParlan's role. Davies explains to McParlan the problem of the Molly Maguires—and that they are named after a gang in Ireland. They need an inside man to infiltrate the pit.

McParlan rents a room from Mary Raines and gives his name as McKenna. He goes to the pit to ask for a job and is told to come back at five o'clock in the morning on the following day. Back at the house he befriends Mary's father.

He begins work the next day—it is back-breaking work and he is exhausted. At the end of the week, he joins the long queue for pay. He is paid $9.24, however a long list is made of "deductions" including cost of explosives and cost of shovels. $9 is deducted, so his pay for the week is 24 cents.

In church, the local priest condemns "last night's actions" by the Molly Maguires—beating a watchman and flooding a mine. James attends church with Mary.

Kehoe confronts James in the pit the next day and asks why he is there. A fake accident is organized where Kehoe rescues James from a huge avalanche of coal. James then gives a false confession saying he is there to avoid the law as he is a forger, and he is in hiding. He also says he killed a man in Buffalo, New York, over a woman. Kehoe discusses "McKenna" with his wife and then with other miners. They do suspect that he is a spy.

After a violent football match with a rival pit, Dougherty gets in a fight with one of the rivals and is beaten up by the police. James is asked to take a revenge action and breaks a policeman's jaw. The captain chastises James but he said he had to make it look real (quoting the captain regarding his earlier attack in the bar).

Kehoe and the four other ringleaders appear at the Raines house and usher old Mr. Raines away. They ask James to kneel and they make the sign of the cross. He thinks he is going to be killed but instead they make him a member of the Ancient Order of Hibernians. Mary chides him for joining, but the next day they take a train trip to the city and go shopping. While Mary is looking at hats, he has a rendezvous with the captain and gets payment for giving the names of the ringleaders.

A train of coal wagons is derailed by an explosion on the track co-ordinated by the Mollys. At a meeting of the Hibernians, James is asked to put a superintendent at the Shenandoah pit out of action. Kehoe, Frazier, and James go to Shenandoah, but are ambushed by the police. The police arrest eight men back at the pit, but all men have alibis. James is taken to the captain to interview, who beats him up before he returns for realism.

By now James and Mary are in love. They go for a picnic and discuss morality.

Frazier and his wife are murdered in their bed by police (the "peelers") in a revenge attack. At the funeral, the priest shows little sympathy. Dougherty is arrested for killing the superintendent of the Shenandoah, but this is a ploy to bring the real killers forward. As old Mr. Raines gets the last rites, the priest calls Kehoe to discuss the whole affair. At Mr. Raines' wake the Mollys meet in a back room. The wake party break into the company store and steal a suit for Mr. Raines to be buried in, but Kehoe then gets carried away and starts stealing more things. He is distracted when James starts destroying bottles of alcohol with a shovel. They decide to set the store on fire.

Kehoe and McAndrew are caught red-handed as they break into the explosives store at the pit and find that it is full of police.

Only at the trial do they discover James' true identity. Mary watches in shock. Kehoe, McAndrew and Dougherty are sentenced to death. Mary explains she could cope with him as a murderer, but not as a traitor.

Awaiting execution, Kehoe is visited in the death cell by James. They have a quiet and civilized conversation. Kehoe sees that James seeks absolution. He suddenly loses his temper and attacks James. He is rescued by the wardens. He tells his one-time ally that no punishment short of hell can redeem his treachery. McParlan retorts that, in that case, "See you in hell."

== Cast ==
- Sean Connery as "Black Jack" Kehoe
- Richard Harris as James McParlan/James McKenna
- Samantha Eggar as Mary Raines
- Frank Finlay as Captain Davies
- Anthony Zerbe as Tom Dougherty
- Bethel Leslie as Mrs. Kehoe
- Art Lund as Frazier
- Philip Bourneuf as Father O'Connor
- Anthony Costello as Frank McAndrew
- Brendan Dillon as Dan Raines
- John Alderson as Jenkins
- Frances Heflin as Mrs. Frazier
- Malachy McCourt as Bartender

== Background ==
The Molly Maguires were a secret organization of Irish coal miners established in nineteenth century Pennsylvania to fight oppressive mineowners. Led by Jack Kehoe, they plant gunpowder to destroy plant shafts and equipment. Pinkerton Detective James McParland was employed to infiltrate the Mollies.

The same incidents was used for the extended flashback sequence in the Sherlock Holmes novel The Valley of Fear. The character of Birdy Edwards in that novel is based on James McParland.

== Production ==
The lead sequence and opening credits for The Molly Maguires runs 14 minutes and 51 seconds, through three Henry Mancini scores, before the first word of dialogue is spoken.

=== Filming ===
The majority of the location filming occurred in Northeastern Pennsylvania in 1968. The town of Eckley, was so unchanged from its 1870s appearance that the only major alterations needed for filming were to remove television antennas and install underground electric wiring. A wooden coal breaker which was built as a prop and is featured extensively in the film, partially stands to this day. The movie resulted in the town's being saved from demolition. It was afterward converted into a mining museum under the control of the Pennsylvania Historical and Museum Commission. Portions of the film were also shot in Jim Thorpe. The courtroom, where the trial scene was filmed is in the Carbon County Courthouse, used for trials until 1996. Railroad scenes were filmed on the now-defunct Carroll Park & Western Railroad in Bloomsburg.

The rest of the film was shot at Paramount Pictures' studio in Hollywood. A set of a coal tunnel took up three separate soundstages, and was reported as the largest set ever built for a film at the time.

During production, three crew members died. Both construction supervisor Elmer Rodgers and prop master Robert McQuellis suffered fatal heart attacks, while the third victim went unnamed. It is believed that filming in the high-altitude Pennsylvania locations may have contributed to the deaths.

This was the second-to-last film for legendary cinematographer James Wong Howe, who had previously worked with director Ritt on Hud and Hombre.

== Reception ==
The film received positive reviews from critics. On the review aggregator Rotten Tomatoes, the film holds an approval rating of 90% based on reviews from 288 critics.

Despite this, the film was a box office bomb. Social issue director Ritt would score later with Norma Rae (1979).

=== Awards and nominations ===
| Institution | Year | Category | Nominee(s) | Result |
|---|---|---|---|---|
| Academy Awards | 1971 | Best Art Direction | Art Direction: Tambi Larsen; Set Decoration: Darrell Silvera | Nominated |
| Fotogramas de Plata | 1972 | Best Foreign Performer | Richard Harris | 5th place |

== Soundtrack ==
The Molly Maguires soundtrack composed by Henry Mancini replaced the one originally composed by Charles Strouse. Mancini's score employed Irish modal harmony, played by period instruments including the Irish Harp, Tin Whistle (pennywhistle) and Squeezebox. Both soundtracks were released by Kritzerland in 2012 on a limited edition CD, now sold-out.

== See also ==
- List of American films of 1970
