= Foster Township, Luzerne County, Pennsylvania =

Township in Pennsylvania, US

Coordinates: 40°58′00″N 75°52′59″W

- Township
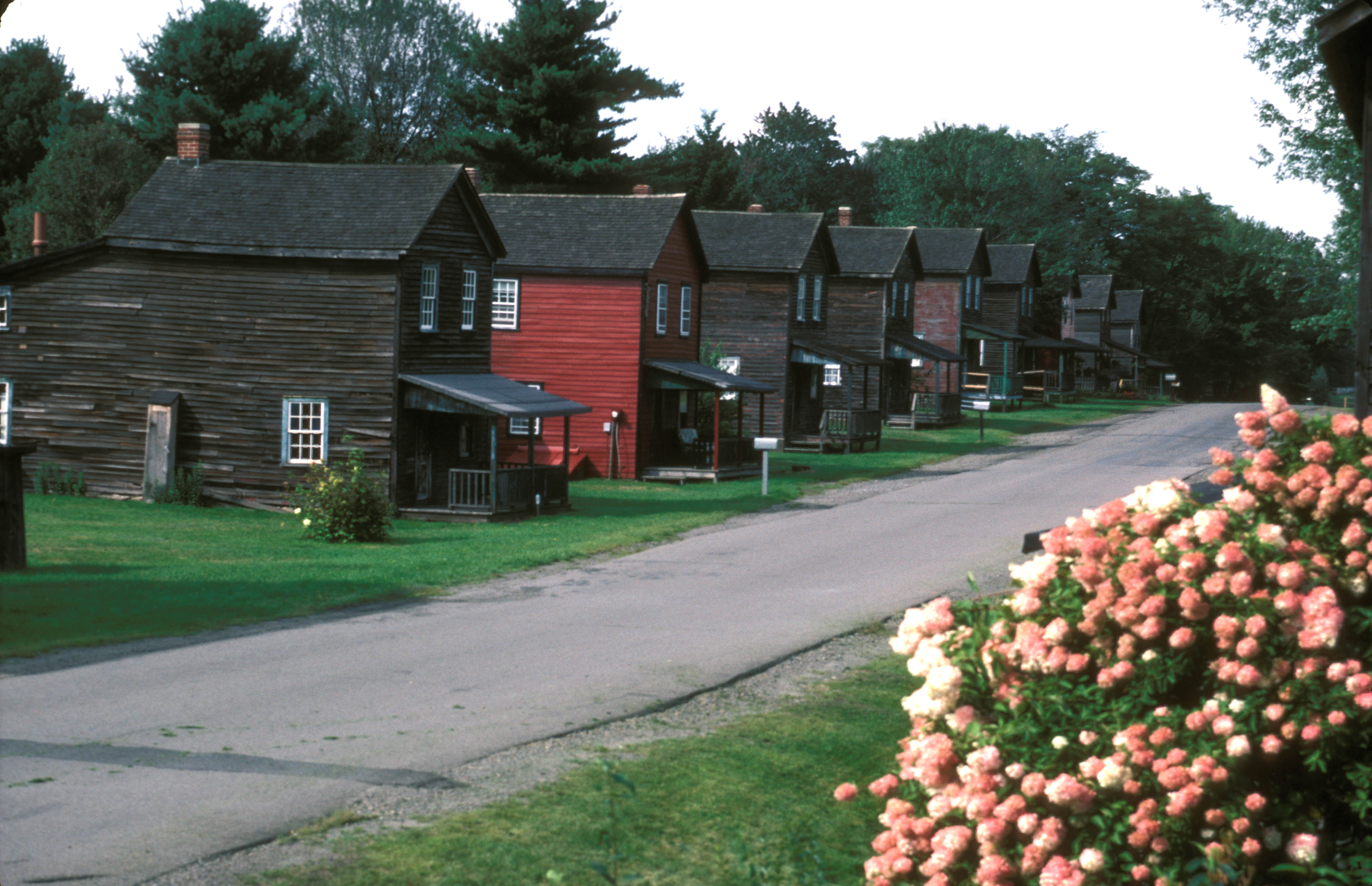
- Eckley Miners' Village in Foster Township

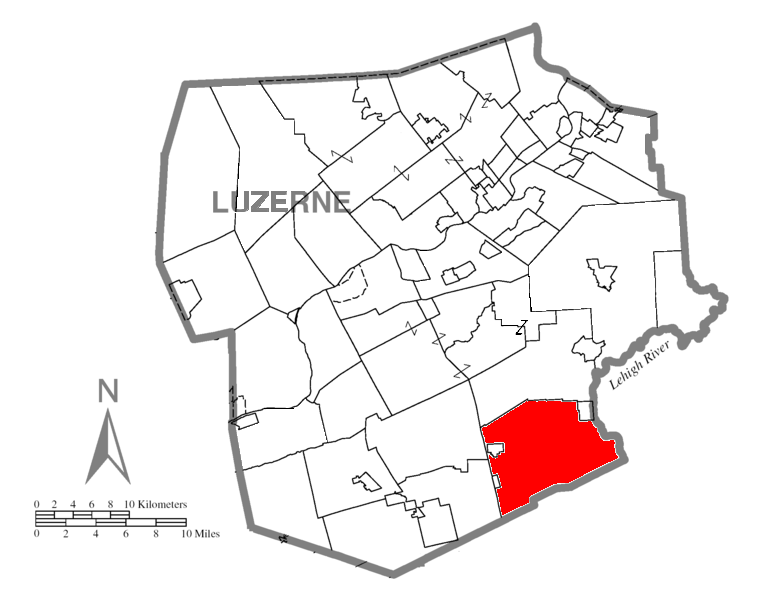
- Map of Luzerne County highlighting Foster Township

- Map of Pennsylvania highlighting Luzerne County
- Country: United States
- State: Pennsylvania
- County: Luzerne
- Settled: 1824
- Incorporated: 1855

Area
  - Total: 45.14 sq mi (116.92 km^{2})
  - Land: 44.87 sq mi (116.21 km^{2})
  - Water: 0.27 sq mi (0.71 km^{2})

Population (2020)
  - Total: 3,413 ▼
  - Estimate (2021): 3,433
  - Density: 76.3/sq mi (29.45/km^{2})
- Time zone: UTC-5 (Eastern (EST))
  - Summer (DST): UTC-4 (EDT)
- FIPS code: 42-079-26928
- Website: fostertownship.org

Foster Township is a township in Luzerne County, Pennsylvania. The population was 3,413 at the 2020 census.

Foster Township police services are provided by White Haven Police Department. Emergency medical services are provided jointly by Freeland Northside Community Ambulance and White Haven Rescue Unit. Fearnots Volunteer Fire Company is Foster Township's Fire Department.

== History ==
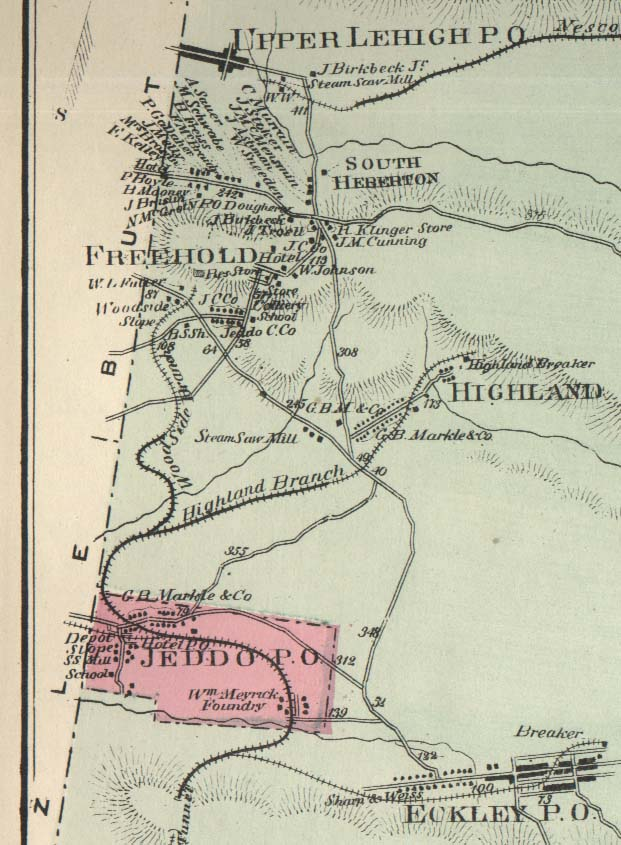
A map of western Foster Township from 1873

=== Founding ===
Modern-day Foster Township was first settled in 1824 by John Lines. In 1855, territory was taken from Dennison Township to create a new municipality in Luzerne County; the new territory was incorporated as a township in 1855. It is named after Asa L. Foster. At the time, coal mining and logging were the two major industries in Foster Township.

=== Eckley Miners’ Village ===
==== Early years ====
Before the 1850s, Eckley was not a mining town, but a rural, forested community called Shingletown. It was located on land owned by Tench Coxe. The inhabitants took advantage of the surrounding woodlands and made shingles to be sold in White Haven and Hazleton. These goods were traded for the necessities of life, such as whiskey, port, and tobacco.

==== Discovery of coal ====
In 1853, four prospectors came to Shingletown and discovered that the land contained several veins of coal. Within the year, the Sharpe, Leisenring, and Company, later known as the Sharpe, Weiss, and Company, was formed. Judge Charles Coxe of Philadelphia, executor of the Tench Coxe Estate, granted the company a 20-year lease for the establishment and operation of a colliery on the 1,500 acres (6 km^{2}) of land. In 1854, the company began to construct a colliery.

By autumn of 1854, the company had constructed a saw mill to provide lumber necessary for the colliery buildings, such as the breaker and stable. Shingletown was renamed Fillmore, presumably in honor of President Millard Fillmore who left office in 1853. The town was later renamed Eckley (in 1857) in honor of Judge Coxe's eldest son, Eckley B. Coxe. In later years, Eckley Coxe, an engineer, became involved in the operations of the village.

==== European immigration ====
The first residents of Eckley were mostly English and Welsh immigrants who came from the mines in Great Britain. By the late 1850s and early 1860s, these miners were joined by groups of Irish farmers, who had immigrated to America after the devastating famine in their homeland. By the 1880s and 1890s, a new wave of immigrants from Eastern and Southern Europe entered Eckley. These groups included people from Slovakia, Poland, Ukraine, Lithuania, and Italy.

==== Modern times ====
The Molly Maguires—a 1970 movie—was filmed in Eckley in 1969. Eckley Miners' Village was listed on the National Register of Historic Places in 1971.

== Geography ==
According to the United States Census Bureau, the township has a total area of 45.2 square miles (117.0 km^{2}), of which 44.9 square miles (116.2 km^{2}) is land and 0.27 square miles (0.7 km^{2}), or 0.63%, is water. The Lehigh River, which is also part of Lehigh Gorge State Park, defines the township's eastern border. The community is made up of dense forests and very little farmland. Homes are scattered throughout the community; the census-designated place of Hickory Hills is located near the center of Foster Township. I-80 and PA 940 run east to west through the northern half of the township.

== Demographics ==
Historical population
Census	Pop.	Note	%±
2000	3,323		—
2010	3,467		4.3%
2020	3,413		−1.6%
2021 (est.)	3,433		0.6%

As of the census of 2000, there were 3,323 people, 1,268 households, and 882 families residing in the township. The population density was 74.1 inhabitants per square mile (28.6/km^{2}). There were 1,657 housing units at an average density of 37.0 per square mile (14.3/km^{2}). The racial makeup of the township was 98.13% White, 1.11% African American, 0.03% Native American, 0.24% Asian, 0.21% from other races, and 0.27% from two or more races. Hispanic or Latino of any race were 0.78% of the population.

There were 1,268 households, out of which 26.8% had children under the age of 18 living with them, 55.8% were married couples living together, 8.8% had a female householder with no husband present, and 30.4% were non-families. 27.1% of all households were made up of individuals, and 13.6% had someone living alone who was 65 years of age or older. The average household size was 2.40 and the average family size was 2.92.

In the township the population was spread out, with 19.5% under the age of 18, 5.2% from 18 to 24, 28.2% from 25 to 44, 28.4% from 45 to 64, and 18.7% who were 65 years of age or older. The median age was 43 years. For every 100 females there were 101.5 males. For every 100 females age 18 and over, there were 101.9 males.

The median income for a household in the township was $36,307, and the median income for a family was $43,065. Males had a median income of $35,589 versus $24,051 for females. The per capita income for the township was $16,824. About 2.3% of families and 4.5% of the population were below the poverty line, including 5.5% of those under age 18 and 5.3% of those age 65 or over.

== Gallery ==
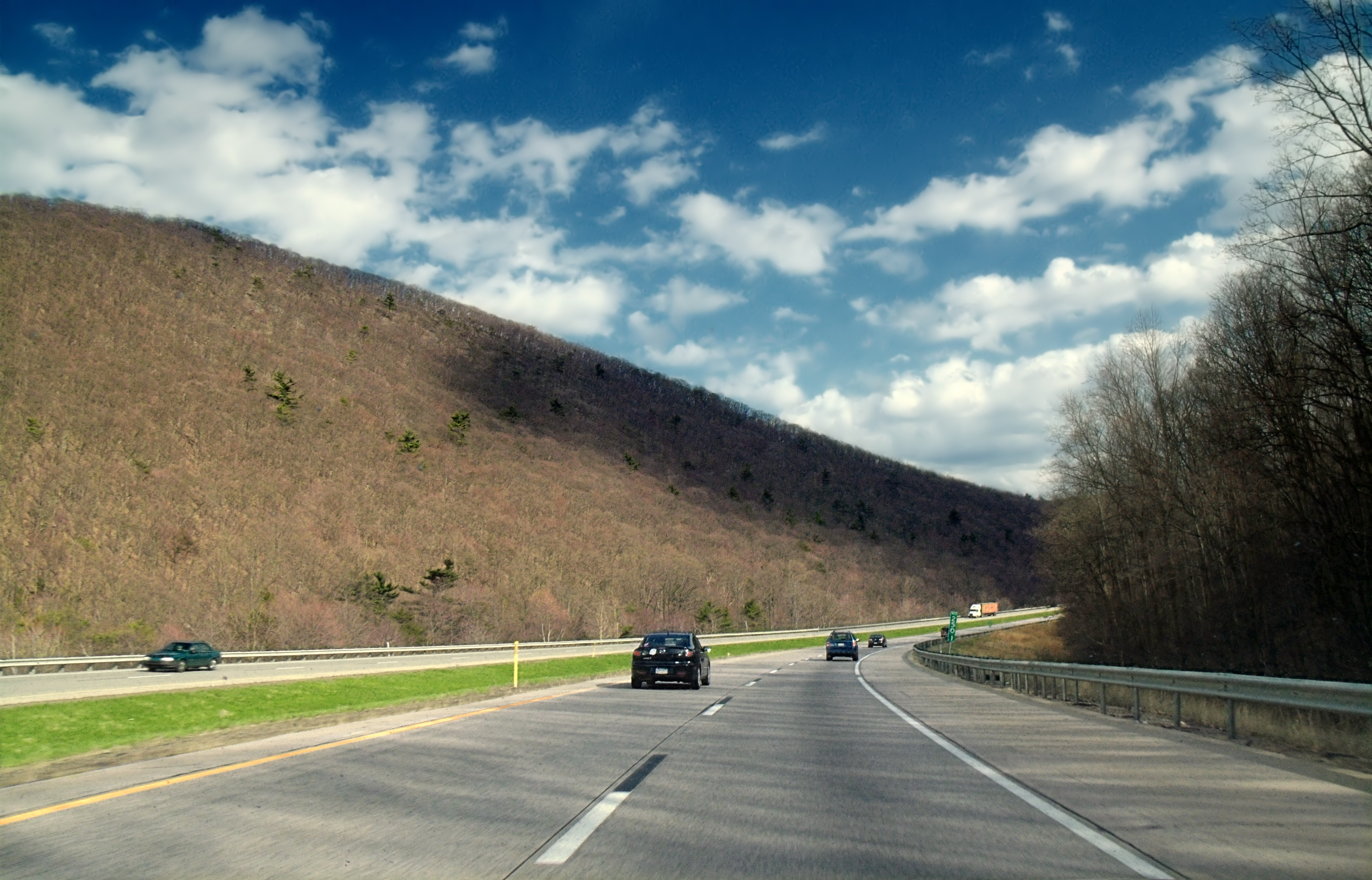
I-80 in Foster Township

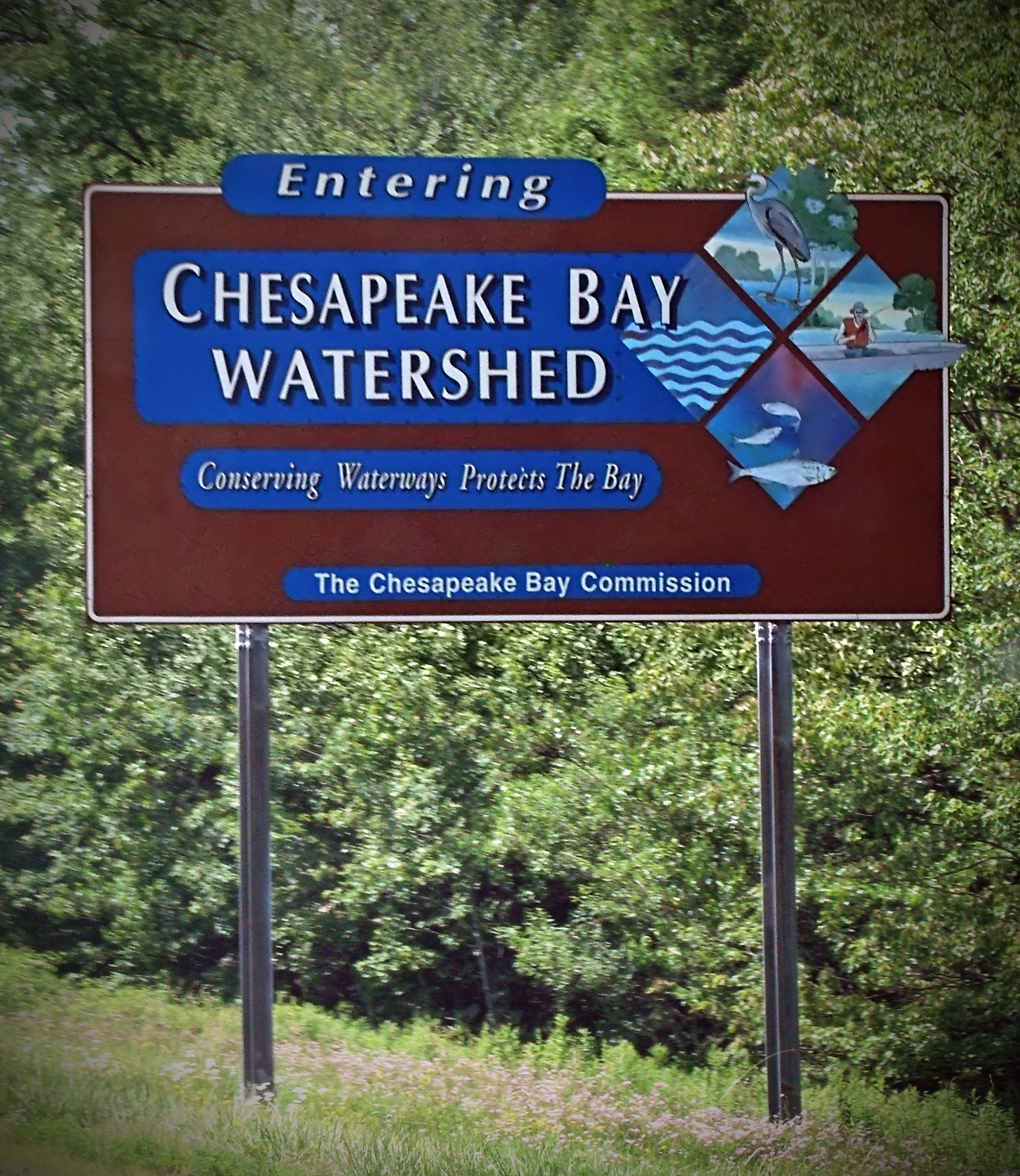
A sign along I-80 in Foster Township

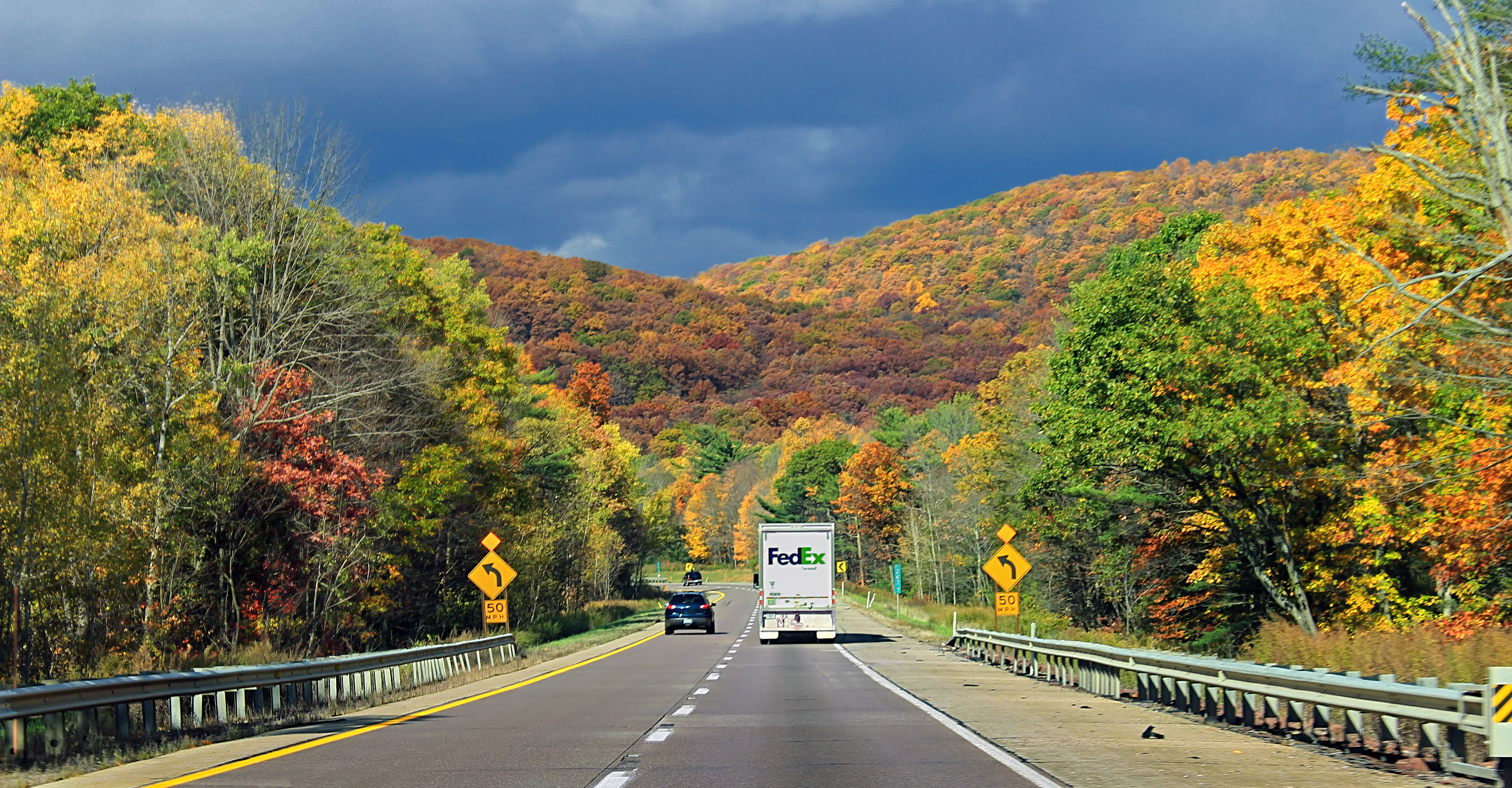
I-80 in Foster Township
