= Eckley Miners' Village =

Historical mining town in Pennsylvania

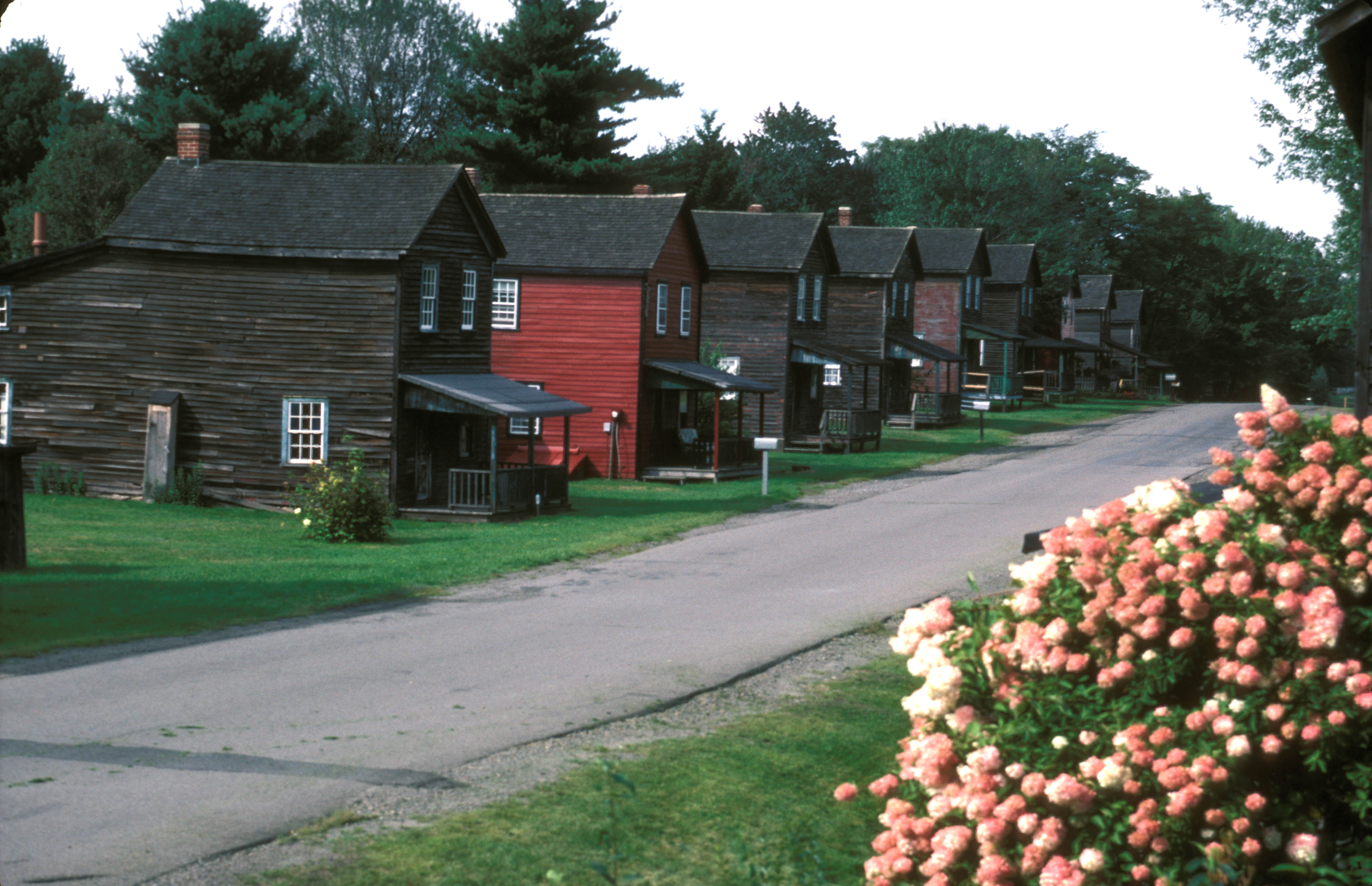
- Miner housing in May 1970

- Location of Eckley Miners' Village in Pennsylvania
- Established: 1970
- Location: Foster Township, U.S. (near Hazleton)
- Coordinates: 40°59′36″N 75°51′46″W
- Curators: Pennsylvania Historical and Museum Commission
- Eckley Historic District
- U.S. National Register of Historic Places
- U.S. Historic district
- Location within Pennsylvania Location within the United States
- Location: Both sides of Main St. through Eckley, Pennsylvania
- Area: 73.2 acres (29.6 ha)
- Built: 1870
- Architect: Sharpe, Weiss & Co.
- Architectural style: Gothic
- NRHP reference No.: 71000710
- Added to NRHP: October 26, 1971

Eckley Miners' Village in eastern Pennsylvania is an anthracite coal mining patch town located in Foster Township, Pennsylvania. Since 1970, Eckley has been owned and operated as a museum by the Pennsylvania Historical and Museum Commission.

== History ==
=== Early years ===
Before the 1850s, Eckley was not a mining town, but a rural, forested community called Shingletown. It was located on land owned by Tench Coxe. The inhabitants took advantage of the surrounding woodlands and made shingles to be sold in White Haven and Hazleton. These goods were traded for the necessities of life, such as "whiskey, port, and tobacco".

=== Coal ===
In 1853, four prospectors came to Shingletown and found that the land contained several veins of coal. Within the year these four men, Richard Sharpe, Asa Lansford Foster, Francis Weiss, and John Leisenring, formed Sharpe, Leisenring and Company, later known as Sharpe, Weiss, and Company. Judge Charles Coxe of Philadelphia, executor of the Tench Coxe Estate, granted the company a 20-year lease for the establishment and operation of a colliery on these 1,500 acres (610 ha). In 1854, the company began work on the Council Ridge Colliery.

By autumn of 1854, the company had constructed a saw mill to provide lumber necessary for the colliery buildings, including the breaker, stable, and store house. They also began building a village to house the colliery workers. The scattered forest dwellings of the residents of Shingletown were quickly replaced by two rows of red wooden frame houses with black trim. This new village was called Fillmore, presumably in honor of President Millard Fillmore who left office in 1853. Several years later, the company applied for a post office for their town and learned that a town in Centre County had already appropriated the name. As a result, the town was renamed Eckley in 1857 in honor of Judge Coxe's eldest son, Eckley B. Coxe who was then 17 years old. In later years, Eckley Coxe, an engineer, became involved in the operations in the town of his name.

=== European Immigrants ===
The first residents of Eckley were mostly English and Welsh immigrants who came from the mines in Great Britain. There also were Germans living in the village who were brought to the colliery as engineers.

By the late 1850s and early 1860s, these colliers were joined by groups of Irish farmers who had immigrated to America after the devastating Great Famine in their homeland. The Irish were generally unskilled in the field of mining and so received the lowest-skilled, lowest-paying jobs. Over time, the Irish learned the skills of mining and moved into better-paying, higher-skilled jobs. By the time of the 1880s and 1890s, the low-skill jobs were being taken by the new wave of immigrants from Eastern and Southern Europe. These groups included peoples from Slovakia, Poland, Ukraine, Lithuania, and Italy. The new immigrants took many years to develop the knowledge and skills to move into the higher-skilled positions in the colliery.

Many of these immigrants came to America expecting to work in the mines just long enough to save money, buy land, and return to the farming lifestyle they had known in Europe. Once they became part of the company-owned system, however, very few were able to escape the years of poverty and hardship that faced them.

== Museum ==
The site is now run as a museum with an indoor and outdoor component by the Pennsylvania Historical and Museum Commission. Buildings that are part of the museum include: the Immaculate Conception Church (1861), three "slate pickers houses" (1854), larger laborers' dwellings (1854), St. James Episcopal Church (1859), mine boss's houses (1860), the doctor's office (1874), and the Sharpe House (1861).

== Molly Maguires ==
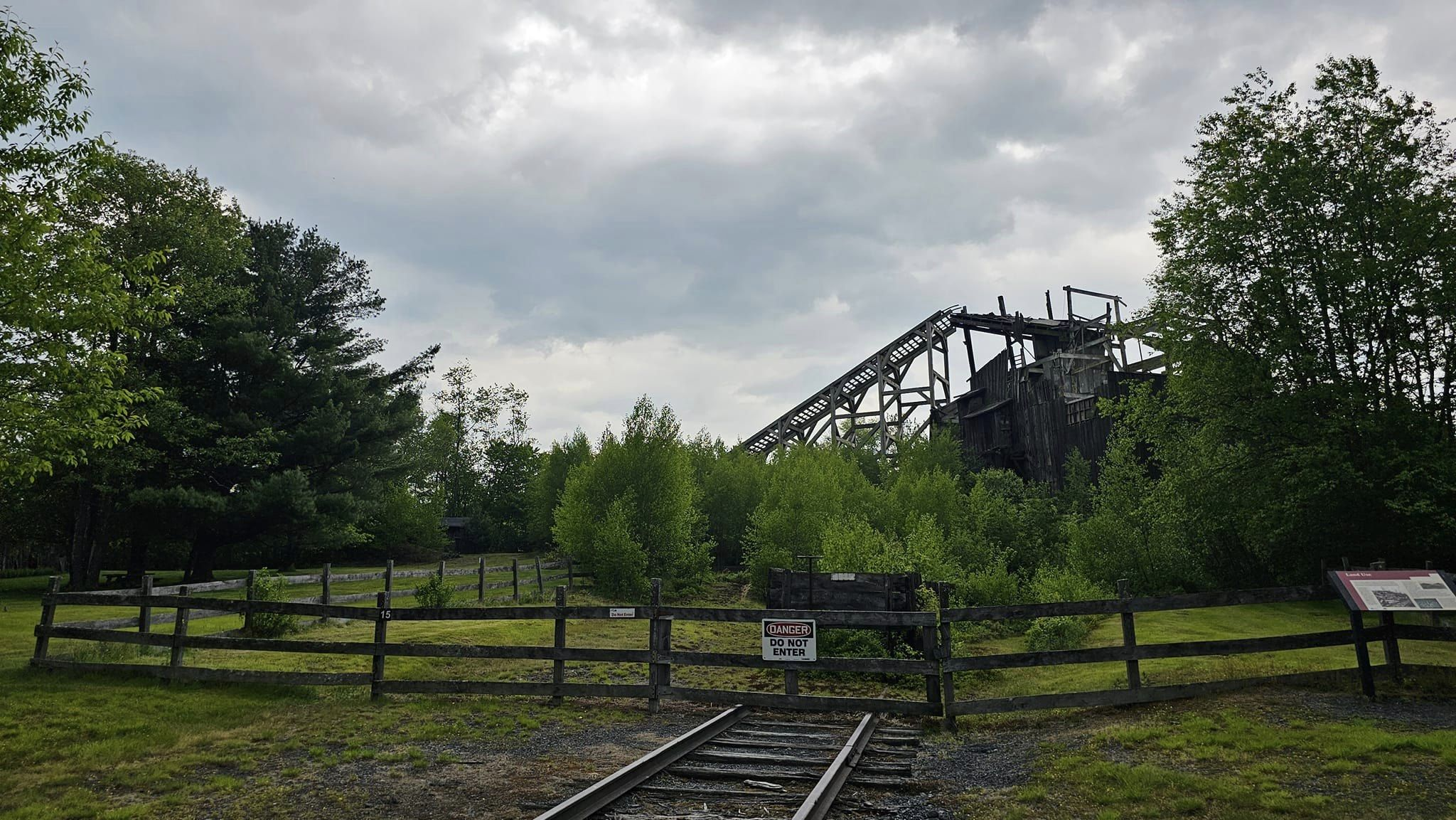
This wooden coal breaker was later built for The Molly Maguires, a 1970 film depicting the Molly Maguires

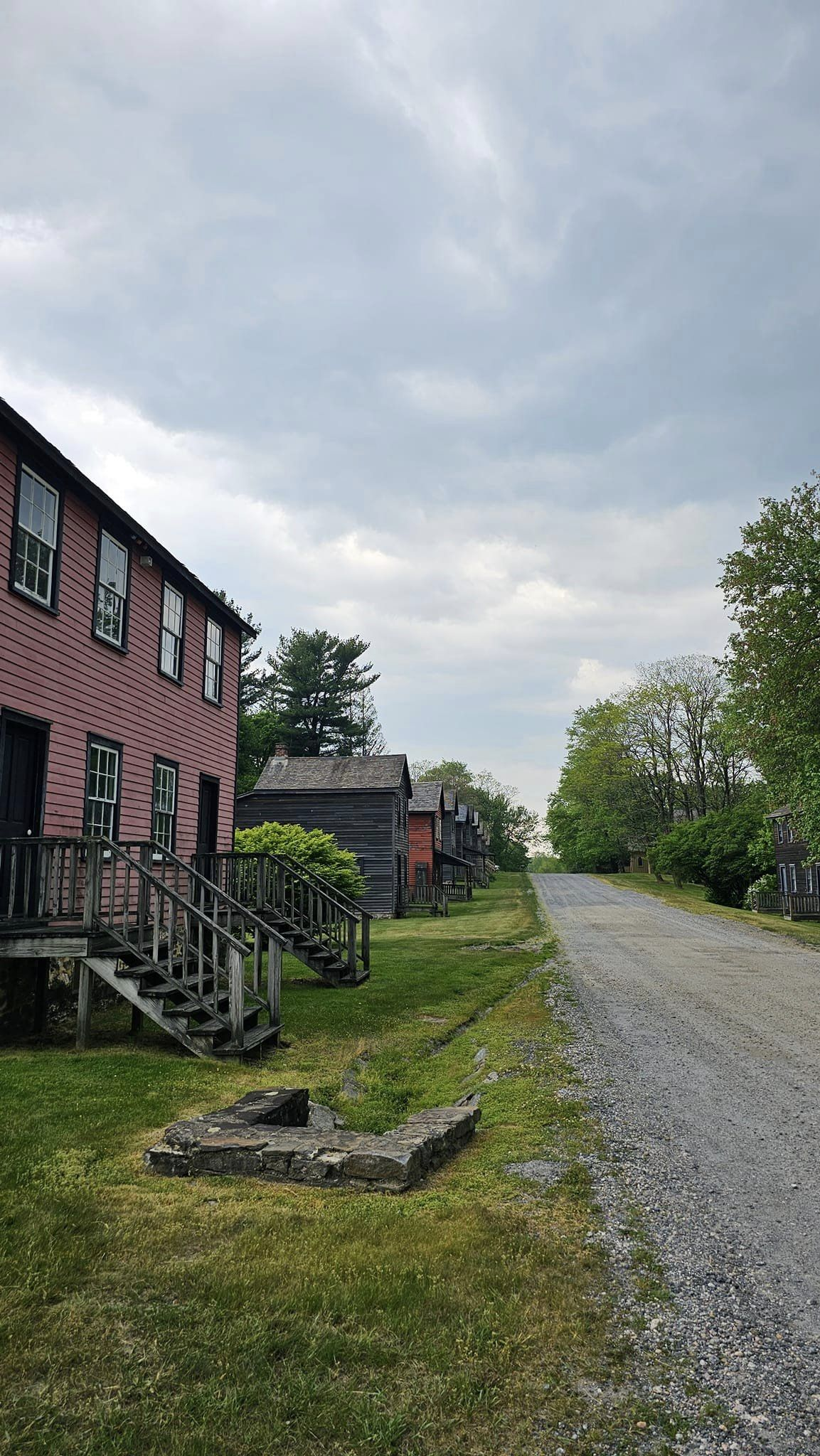
Houses in the back of the village

=== Film ===
The Molly Maguires, a 1970 film, was filmed in Eckley in 1969. The wooden "coal breaker" featured heavily in the film was built as a prop. It received little or no maintenance over the years and, even though it has been called a "tinderbox", still stands. The company store was also built as a prop for the movie and still exists today.

The filming of this movie resulted in the town's being saved from demolition, and was afterward turned into a mining museum under the control of the Pennsylvania Historical and Museum Commission.

== Town geography ==
Traveling east to west down Main Street the houses become larger toward the end of town. Like most industrial companies of the 19th century, Sharpe, Weiss and Company planned the village with the occupation and rent paying abilities of their workers in mind. In Eckley, the mine owners lived at the western end of town. The original company store, mule barn, hotel and doctor's office were also located there.

Mine foremen and their families rented the single dwellings located just east of the downtown. First class miners, those men with experience in mining, were assigned the 2 1/2-story double houses in the middle of the village. These were larger than the 1 1/2-story double dwellings rented to their assistants or laborers.

== See also ==
- Coal Region
- Anthracite coal
- Pennsylvania Historical and Museum Commission
- The Molly Maguires (film)
