= Armed Forces March Competition =

- Date: 1954
- Type: Song contest
- Participants: 137

The Armed Forces March Competition was a 1954 inter-service contest among the United States Armed Forces organized by the American Society of Composers, Authors and Publishers (ASCAP) and the U.S. Department of Defense and convened as part of that year's observances in commemoration of the birth of John Philip Sousa. Four original marches were selected to receive ASCAP-John Philip Sousa Awards during a February ceremony at The Pentagon.

== Background and rules ==
The "White Hat March" won the Navy portion of the competition.

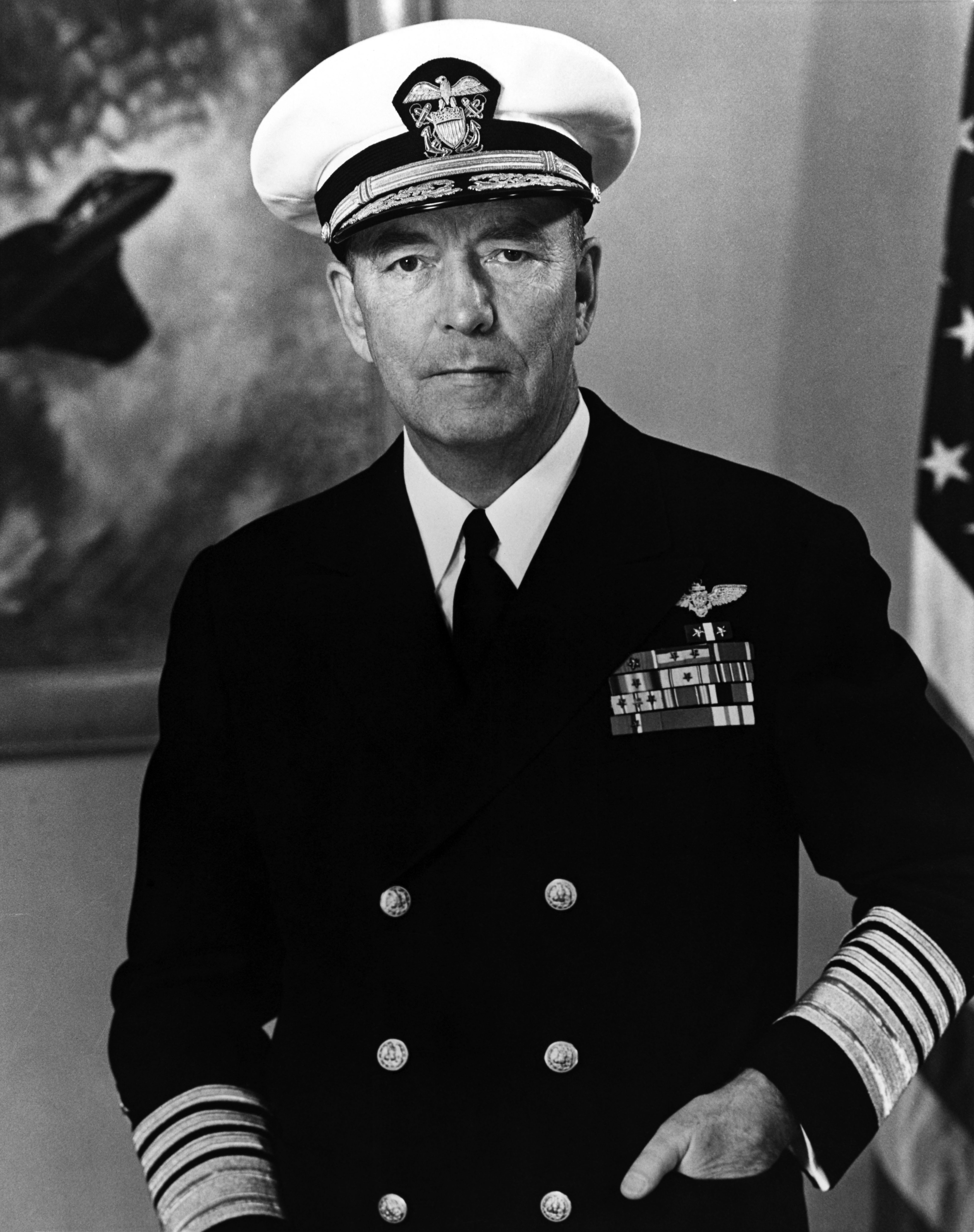
Admiral Arthur Radford (pictured) presided over the competition's awards ceremony.

John Philip Sousa, the former commanding officer of "The President's Own" United States Marine Corps Band and of the Navy Band at the Great Lakes Naval Station, was born in 1854 and died in 1932. The Armed Forces March Competition was conceived of by the U.S. Department of Defense and ASCAP to commemorate the 1954 centenary of his birth.

The competition solicited original military marches from personnel of the United States Army, United States Air Force, United States Navy, and United States Marine Corps, with one entry selected from each participating force to receive an ASCAP-John Philip Sousa Award and a prize of $1,000. Entries were restricted to those composed by persons on active duty for 90 days or more by the entry deadline and only previously unpublished marches were accepted.

== Judging and winners ==
Three-person judging panels were convened to choose each of the four winners from out of 137 submitted entries, with the first round of judging taking place in Washington, D.C., and the second round at West Point, New York. Among the judges were Albertus L. Meyers and Frank Simon, at the time the only two still-living cornet soloists to have been commanded by Sousa. The winning compositions were: representing the Navy, the "White Hat March" by Gerard Bowen; representing the Air Force, "Thunderjet March" by Lawrence M. Rosenthal; representing the Army, "Army Field Forces March" by Earl Mays; and representing the Marine Corps, the "Esprit de Corps March" by Carl Hoffman. Winners were recognized in a February 1954 ceremony at The Pentagon presided over by Admiral Arthur Radford, Chairman of the Joint Chiefs of Staff.

== See also ==
- Martial music
