= Marching 97 =

Marching band at Lehigh University

- Nickname: The Finest Band East of All Points West
- School: Lehigh University
- Location: Bethlehem, Pennsylvania, U.S.
- Conference: Patriot League
- Founded: 1906; 120 years ago
- Director: Darin Lewis
- Members: 97
- Fight song: "Lehigh Fight"
- Motto: The Finest Band East of All Points West
- Website: marching97.org

The Marching 97 is the marching band of Lehigh University in Bethlehem, Pennsylvania. Founded in 1906, the band is known as "The Finest Band East of All Points West". It is a student-run organization, with an executive council of thirteen student members and supervised by the Music Department's Director of Bands, Dr. Darin Lewis. Football game halftime shows are written by the students. The number 97 is the count of the full marching band, composed of twelve ranks of eight members each, plus one drum major.

== History ==
The band was founded as the University Band in 1906 by a group of students led by Edward E. Ross (class of 1908). Approximately fifteen men met for the first time in Christmas-Saucon Hall, which was then called Saucon Hall, on October 29, 1906. A year later, on October 2, 1907, the University Band made its first appearance at a Lehigh University football game.

The band had a rocky existence in its early years, and little is known about the group's activities in the late 1900s and early 1910s. It went extinct and was reformed a number of times in its first decade. The University Band had its first recorded director in 1914, a former Bethlehem Steel Co. Band member by the name of J.C. Cranmer. He was replaced by Anton M. Weingartner, then the director of the Bethlehem Steel Co. Band, in 1916 when the band was once again reorganized. However, the band was significantly affected by World War I, and did not perform during the 1917 or 1918 football seasons. In October 1919, the University Band finally established a permanent presence on Lehigh University's campus. They were supported by becoming part of the R.O.T.C. on campus, allowing for the government to provide uniforms, music, and instruments. This partnership would last for several decades.

In the early years of its existence, the university band was not a marching band, simply acting as a pep band at all manner of sporting and campus events. The group's first recorded marching performance occurred on November 4, 1922 at a football game at Colgate University. With new uniforms, the men marched on the field to a "hearty reception."

The band had been student-run since its inception and would continue to be for its entire lifetime, but established musicians occasionally came in to act as a director and advisor in its early years. At the beginning of the 1923 football season, the Brown and White Band permanently came under the supervision of a faculty director. Doctor T. Edgar Shields, also the university organist, became the first official faculty director of the band. He was assisted by Captain C.A. Shamotulski, who instructed marching, signaling a shift from simply a pep band to a marching band. That same year, the band performed its earliest recorded specific marching formation: a "monster L" at the annual Lehigh-Lafayette game. In 1925, the band found its first dedicated headquarters in the College Commons building (now known as Lamberton Hall).

The Lehigh University Band continued to grow, reaching its largest size in history with 152 marchers reporting in the fall of 1939. Their marching style had developed into formations of words and images that would characterize the group until the 1950s. Called "blackboard drills", the band members would meet to learn their new shows via diagrams on a blackboard before bringing the show onto the football field. In 1942, the University Band moved their headquarters from Lamberton Hall to the newly built Grace Hall.

However, World War II had a significant impact on the University Band. Membership dropped drastically; the band fielded thirty or fewer marchers each year, and off-campus performances stopped. The band was the only Music Department ensemble that remained active during the war.

After the end of World War II, the band recovered much of its former vitality, but Shields stepped down from his position at the end of the academic year in 1947. He was replaced for the 1947 football season by William H. Schempf. Schempf reorganized the band, reducing its numbers to around seventy marchers and instituting spring concerts to follow the football season. In 1948, he further reformed the band, instituting the familiar ninety-seven member system for the first time. The group, still student-run, also became commonly known on campus as the Brown and White Band in this era. This name covered three groups acting as one organization, as Lehigh's Music Department had not yet fully separated into its current ensembles. Also under Schempf, the traditional band camp at the start of the academic year began in 1951.

On September 14, 1954, the Marching 97's iconic "Marching LEHIGH" drill was performed for the first time at an away game against the University of Virginia. The maneuver was directly responsible for creating the band's favored system of twelve ranks consisting of eight marchers each. The ninety-seventh person is the drum major, giving the band its eventual name.

At the start of the 1957 academic year, Jonathan Elkus replaced Schempf as faculty director. In 1958, the band would relocate back to Lamberton Hall. That same year, they premiered their first precision drill under Elkus' leadership. This style is based on rank marching (in which each rank of the band moves as one unit rather than each member having individual drill), and primarily results in geometric formations. The band continues to use this marching style today.

Under Elkus, the Brown and White Band continued to grow. The group released its first album, Sounds of Lehigh, in 1959 in conjunction with the Lehigh University Glee Club and the Lehigh Cliff Clefs. A few years later in 1963, the band performed at Carnegie Hall for the first time, in concert with the Columbia University band. A second album was also released that year, Moonshine and Marches of Old South Mountain.

On October 4, 1964, the Brown and White Band performed a concert at the 1964 New York World's Fair, having successfully applied for the opportunity. Over 2000 were in attendance at the Tiparillo Pavilion for the performance, at which the band played marches and Lehigh fight songs.

On October 11, 1969, the Marching 97 went to Rutgers Stadium along with women from nearby colleges acting as cheerleaders for the first time. In this centennial year of college football, the Lehigh football team won in an upset 17-7 over favored Rutgers. As reported in The New York Times, "A group of girl cheerleaders appearing at their first game for Lehigh, danced and ran along the sidelines in approval and amazement."

=== List of directors ===
Director	Tenure
J. Clarence Cranmer	1914 (exact years unknown)
Anton M. Weingartner	1916 (exact years unknown)
T. Edgar Shields	1923-1947
William H. Schempf	1947-1957
Jonathan Elkus	1957-1973
James Brown	1973-1978
C.J. Hamman	1978-1989
Casey Teske	1990-1996
Al Neumeyer	1996-2017
Darin Lewis	2017-2018, 2022–present
David B. Diggs	2019-2022

In 1952, Schempf took a leave of absence to study as a Fulbright Scholar. He was replaced by Robert Beaudreau.

In 1969, Elkus went on sabbatical for the spring semester. He was replaced by Albertus L. Meyers.

In 1993, Teske took a sabbatical during the fall semester. He was replaced by Al Neumeyer.

== Traditions ==
During Spirit Week, the week before The Rivalry, the football game versus Lafayette College, the band serenades the campus with traditional fight songs in an "Eco-flame", marching through classrooms, dining halls, and even the library.

New band members are issued a brown bucket hat with their class year embroidered on it. Though not the same style, these hats are referred to as “dinks” in reference to the beanie (seamed cap) that freshmen at Lehigh were required to wear as a form of hazing. Band members wear dinks and branded t-shirts at smaller events.

The band performs a drill called Marching LEHIGH after every halftime show, followed by a standstill performance of Lehigh's alma mater. It was first performed on September 24, 1954 at an away game against the University of Virginia. The maneuver consists of twelve vertical lines of marchers moving towards the end zone, then countermarching in the other direction to spell out "LEHIGH" on the field. The song "Lehigh Victory March" is played during this drill. The move has been performed at almost every football game since, with the exception of the 1990s and 2000s, during which band membership was too low to create the formation (it was reserved solely for the Lehigh-Lafayette game in those years).

For home games, the band marches into the football stadium in "Two Long Lines".

== Notable performances ==
In February 1963, the band performed at Carnegie Hall for the first time, in concert with the Columbia University band. The concert was directed by Jonathan Elkus and Columbia band director Elias Dann, who had come up with the idea after a football game the previous fall.

On April 10, 1969, the band and the Yale Band were in concert at Carnegie Hall. Lehigh Professor and Band Director, Jonathan Elkus, conducted the first work, Fanfare: Salute to Lehigh University, composed in 1968 by Sir Arthur Bliss, then Master of the Queen's Music. Later, director of the Allentown Band and friend of John Philip Sousa, Albertus L. Meyers, conducted a work composed by Professor Elkus, Camino Real, Introduction and Pasodoble for Band.

On November 8, 1971, the Marching 97 was featured on the nationally televised program, Monday Night Football, during halftime of the Los Angeles Rams – Baltimore Colts game at Memorial Stadium in Baltimore. Professor Elkus conducted the band in music from Jesus Christ Superstar and his own special composition. Drum Major Thomas Voystock led the band in a series of precision drills.

On November 22, 2014, the Marching 97 performed during pre-game and halftime of the 150th game against Lafayette held at Yankee Stadium. The day before, a small contingent of band members took the Eco-flame to Manhattan, by playing Lehigh fight songs in places such as Washington Square Park, Central Park, and at the Charging Bull.

The Marching 97 performed at London's New Year's Day Parade on January 1, 2018. Also on this trip, it performed at Cadogan Hall on December 29, 2017.

== Music ==
Fight songs include:

- Lehigh University Alma Mater
- Goblet
- Rearing, Tearing
- Lehigh Will Shine
- Lehigh Fight

=== Albums and recordings ===
The Marching 97 has produced four albums and recordings over the years, often partnering with other music groups at Lehigh:

- "Lehigh Sounds." Lehigh University Concert Band, Lehigh Cliff Clefs, & Lehigh University Glee Club. Directed by Jonathan Elkus & Robert Cutler. Recorded 1959.
- "Moonshine and Marches from Old South Mountain." Lehigh University Concert Band. Directed by Jonathan Elkus. Recorded 1963.
- "Fanfares - Songs - Marches." Lehigh University Marching 97. Directed by Jonathan Elkus. Recorded 1972.
- "Stands Tunes 2018." Lehigh University Marching 97. Directed by Brian Luster, '19 & David B. Diggs. Recorded 2018.

=== Songs written for the band ===
A number of composers have written songs especially for the Marching 97, including:

- "March- Lehigh University Band." James Mack, '38. (1937)
- "Pride of the 97." Richard Franko Goldman. (1967)
- "Fanfare: Salute to Lehigh University." Sir Arthur Bliss. (1968)
- "The Powers That Be." Richard Krause, '71. (1968)

== Gallery ==
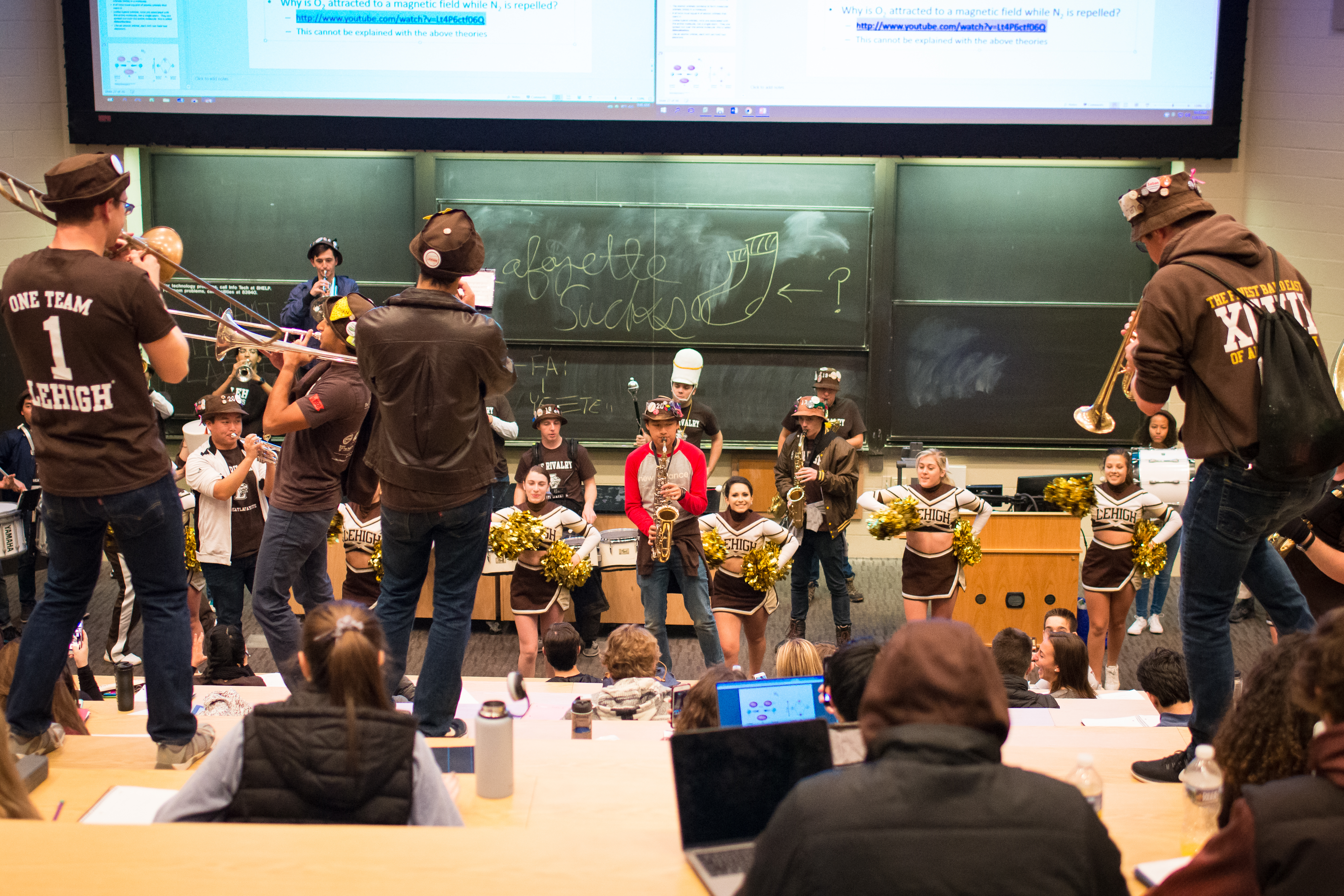
The band “flames” a classroom in Neville Hall as part of the annual “Eco-Flame” tradition.

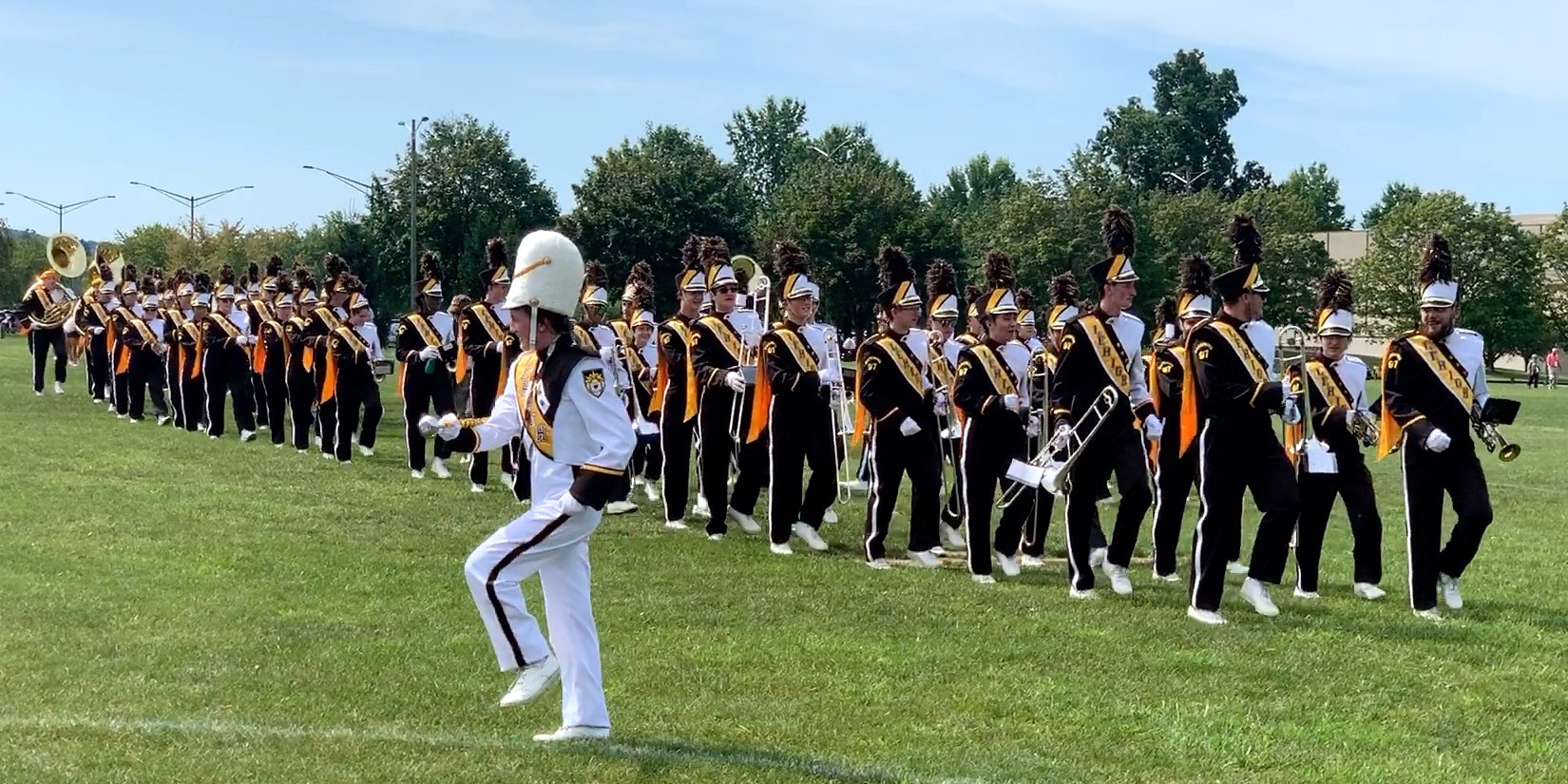
The Marching 97 in Two Long Lines

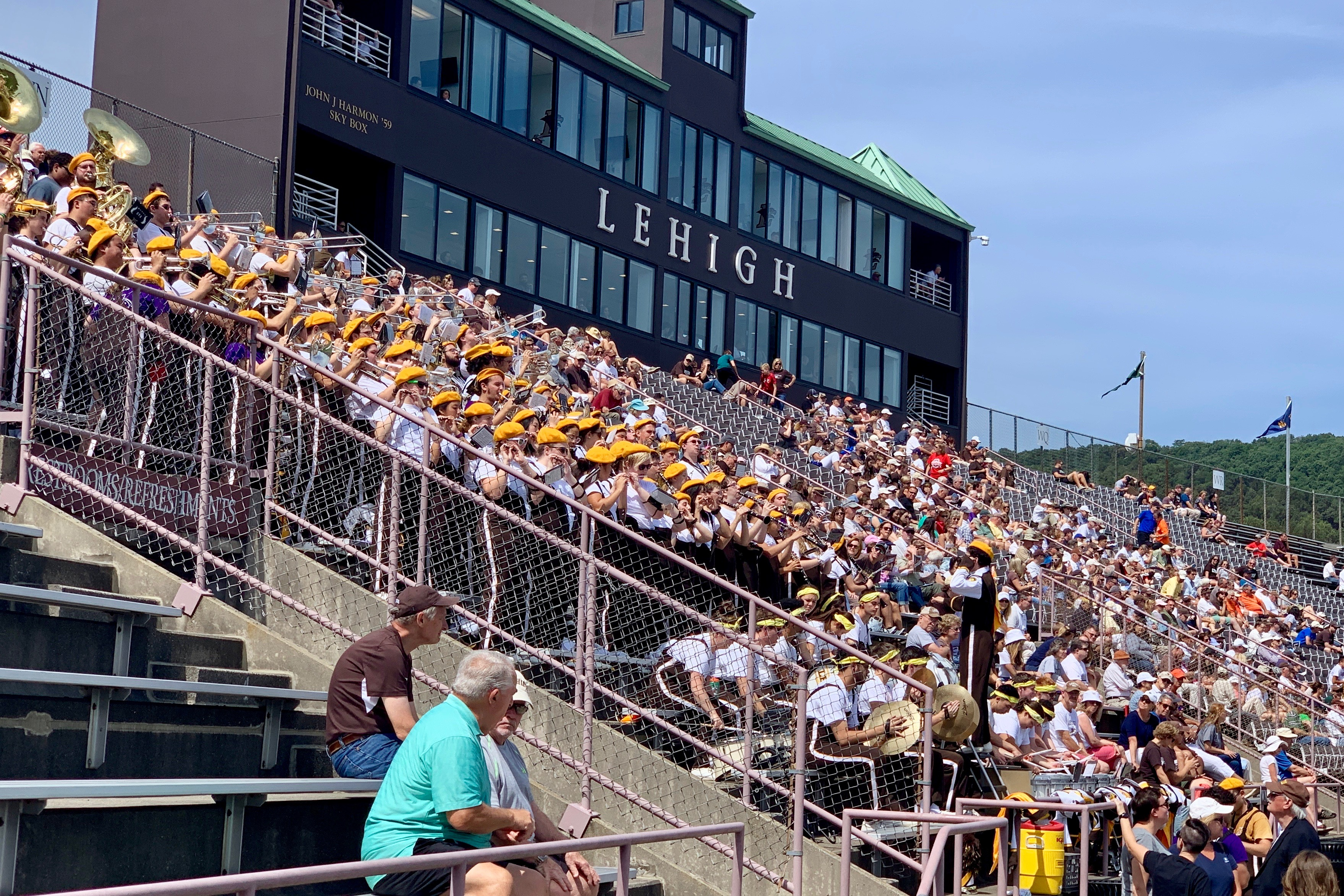
The band performing at Goodman Stadium

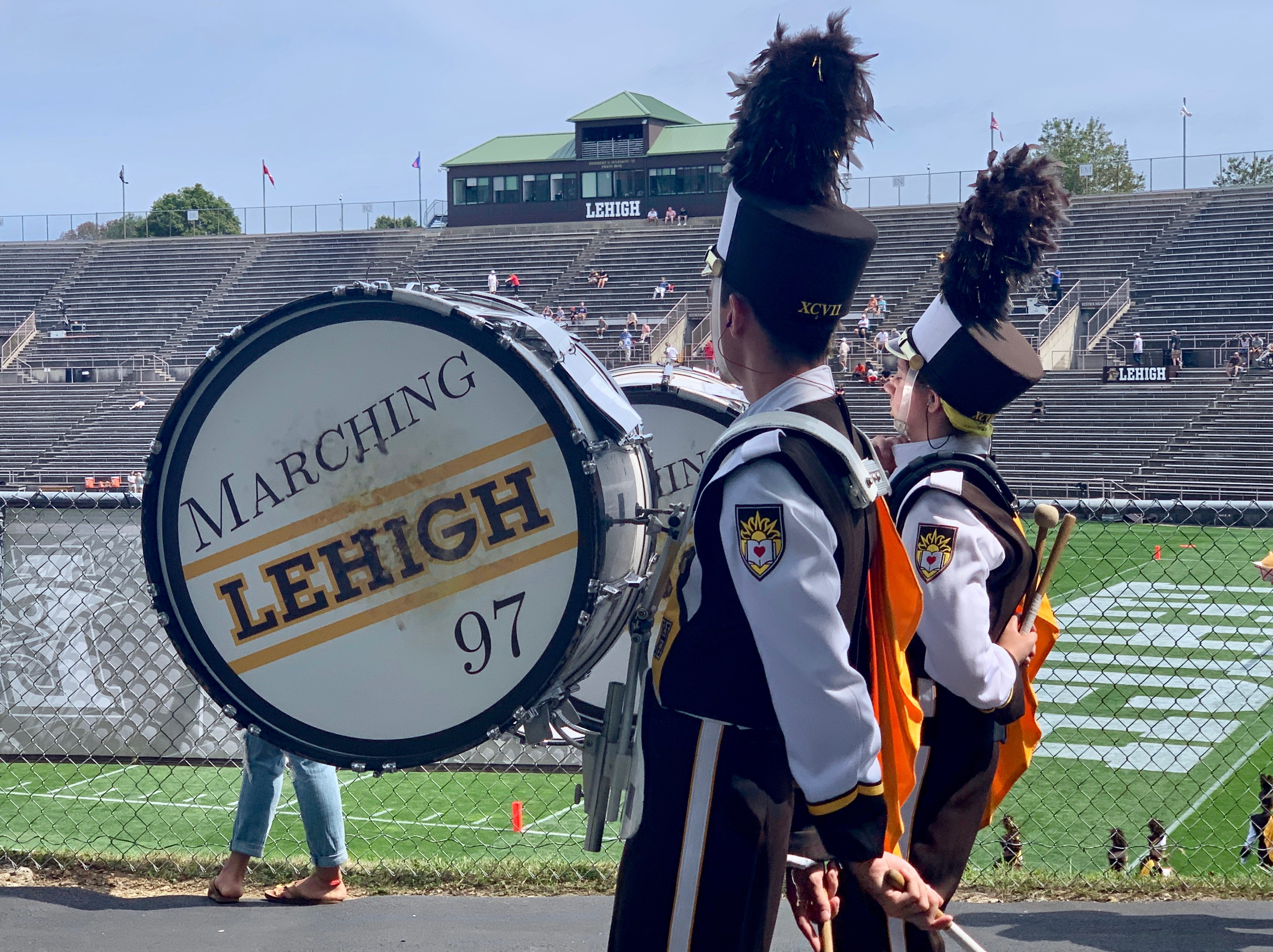
Bass drums
