= Albertus L. Meyers =

American music conductor (1890–1979)

Albertus L. Meyers (1890 – May 15, 1979) was an American music conductor and cornet player from Allentown, Pennsylvania. He was the bandmaster of the Allentown Band for fifty years, from 1926 to 1976. He was also a friend and exponent of John Philip Sousa.

== Career ==
At Carnegie Hall in 1969, he conducted the Marching 97 in Camino Real, Introduction and Pasodoble for Band composed by Lehigh University professor Jonathan Elkus.

== Legacy ==
In 1974, the Eighth Street Bridge in Allentown, Pennsylvania was renamed the Albertus L. Meyers Bridge in Meyers' honor. He had played cornet on the opening day celebration of the bridge in 1913.

The Allentown Band continues to hold tribute concerts in his honor.

== Discography ==
- The Allentown Band salutes the great German march writers.
- The Allentown Band plays marches for Bert's 85th birthday.
