= Goodman Stadium =

Stadium in Lower Saucon Township, Pennsylvania

Coordinates: 40°35′20″N 75°21′19″W

Murray H. Goodman Stadium
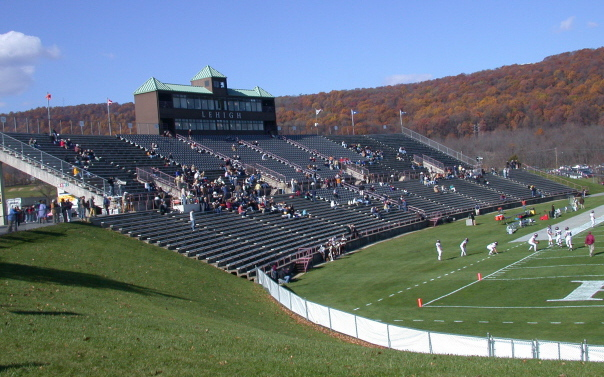
- Goodman Stadium in November 2006
- Interactive map of Murray H. Goodman Stadium
- Location: Goodman Campus, Lehigh University, Lower Saucon Township, Pennsylvania, U.S.
- Owner: Lehigh University
- Operator: Lehigh University
- Capacity: 16,000 (1989–present); 14,000 (1988)
- Surface: Grass

Construction
- Groundbreaking: 1987
- Opened: October 1, 1988
- Cost: $5.25 million ($14.3 million in 2025 dollars)
- Architect: Spillman Farmer Architects
- General contractor: Alvin H. Butz Inc.

Tenants
- Lehigh Mountain Hawks (NCAA) (1988–present); Bethlehem Steel FC (USL) (2016–2018)

Goodman Stadium is Lehigh University's 16,000-seat stadium located on its Goodman Campus in Lower Saucon Township, Pennsylvania. (Note: Lehigh is often affiliated with the neighboring city of Bethlehem, as that is the home to Lehigh's main "Asa Packer Campus.") It opened in 1988, replacing Taylor Stadium, which stood in the main academic campus from 1914 until 1987. The former Taylor Stadium site now holds the Rauch Business Center, the Zoellner Arts Center, and a parking garage.

The Murray H. Goodman Stadium is named after real estate developer Murray H. Goodman, a Lehigh alumnus, who donated 550 acres in Saucon Valley in 1983 to build a sports complex.

The stadium is the home of the Lehigh Mountain Hawks football team, who compete in the Patriot League at the Division I Football Championship Subdivision (or FCS) level, formerly known as I-AA. Located in a rural valley surrounded by wooded hills, its ample nearby parking makes tailgating before games very popular. Concession stands protected from the weather and large indoor restrooms are provided on both sides of the stadium. It also features a two-tiered press box/skybox overlooking the west grandstand, limited chair back seating and locker rooms for home and visiting teams. Prior to the 2019 football season, a new press box was constructed behind the east grandstand and the previous media facility was converted into additional suites.

The Goodman Campus was the preseason training camp location for the NFL's Philadelphia Eagles from 1996 to 2012. Eagles' training camps often draw as many as 10,000 fans, ranking at the top of NFL training camp attendance. The Eagles' twice-daily practices were held from mid-July to mid-August.

Starting in 2016, Goodman Stadium hosts the home matches of Bethlehem Steel FC, the official affiliate of Major League Soccer's Philadelphia Union. Lack of lights resulted in the Steel moving its home matches to Talen Energy Stadium after the 2018 season. It hosted one United States men's national soccer team match, a 0–1 loss to Ukraine on October 23, 1993.

In 2024, Goodman Stadium hosted the 160th playing of the Lehigh-Lafayette rivalry. The rivalry is college football's most-played series. Lehigh won the game 38–13, with Lehigh fans tearing down the goal posts and marching it over South Mountain to throw in the Lehigh river.

== Gallery ==
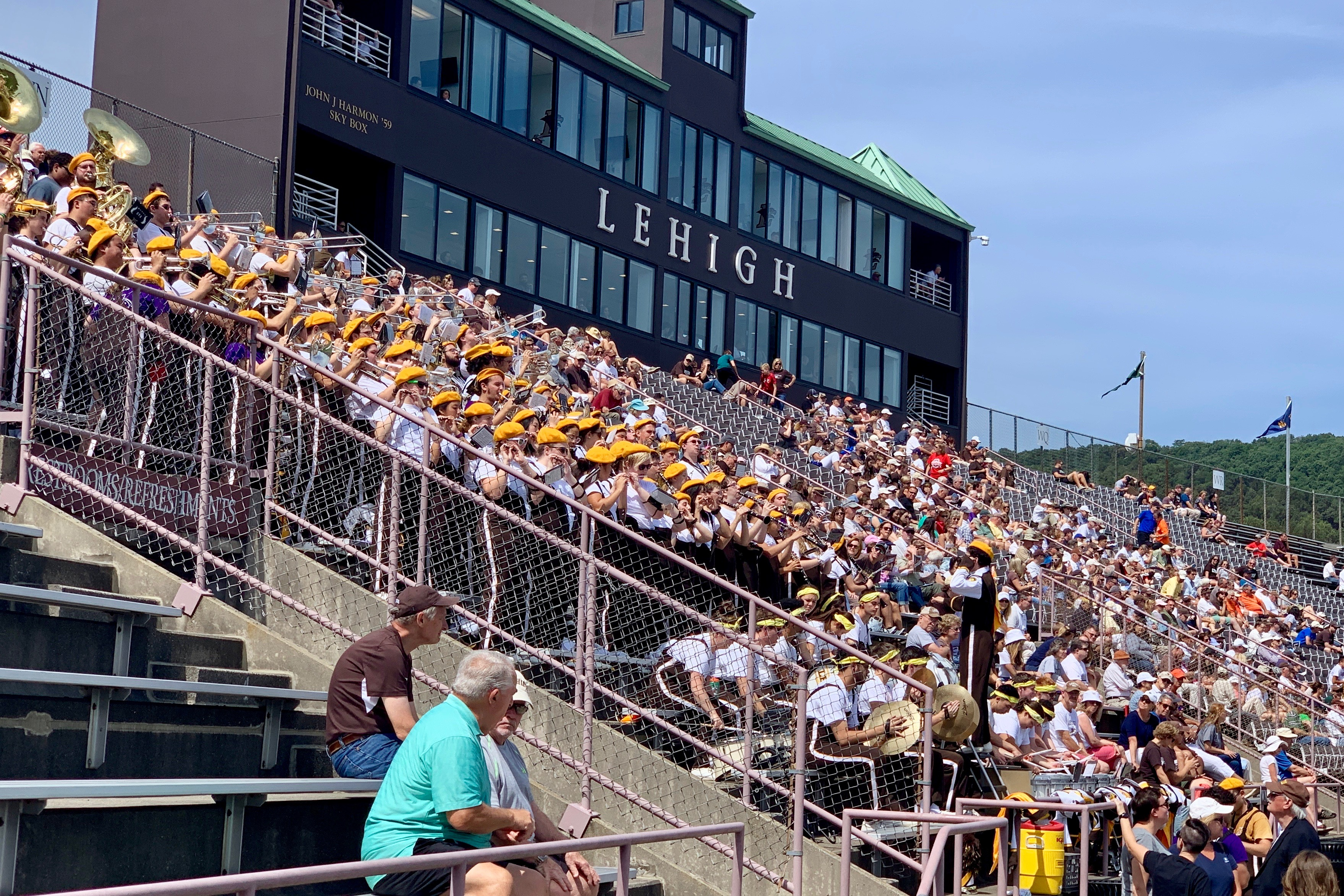
Marching 97 performing at the stadium in 2019 with the John J. Harmon '59 Sky Box in the background

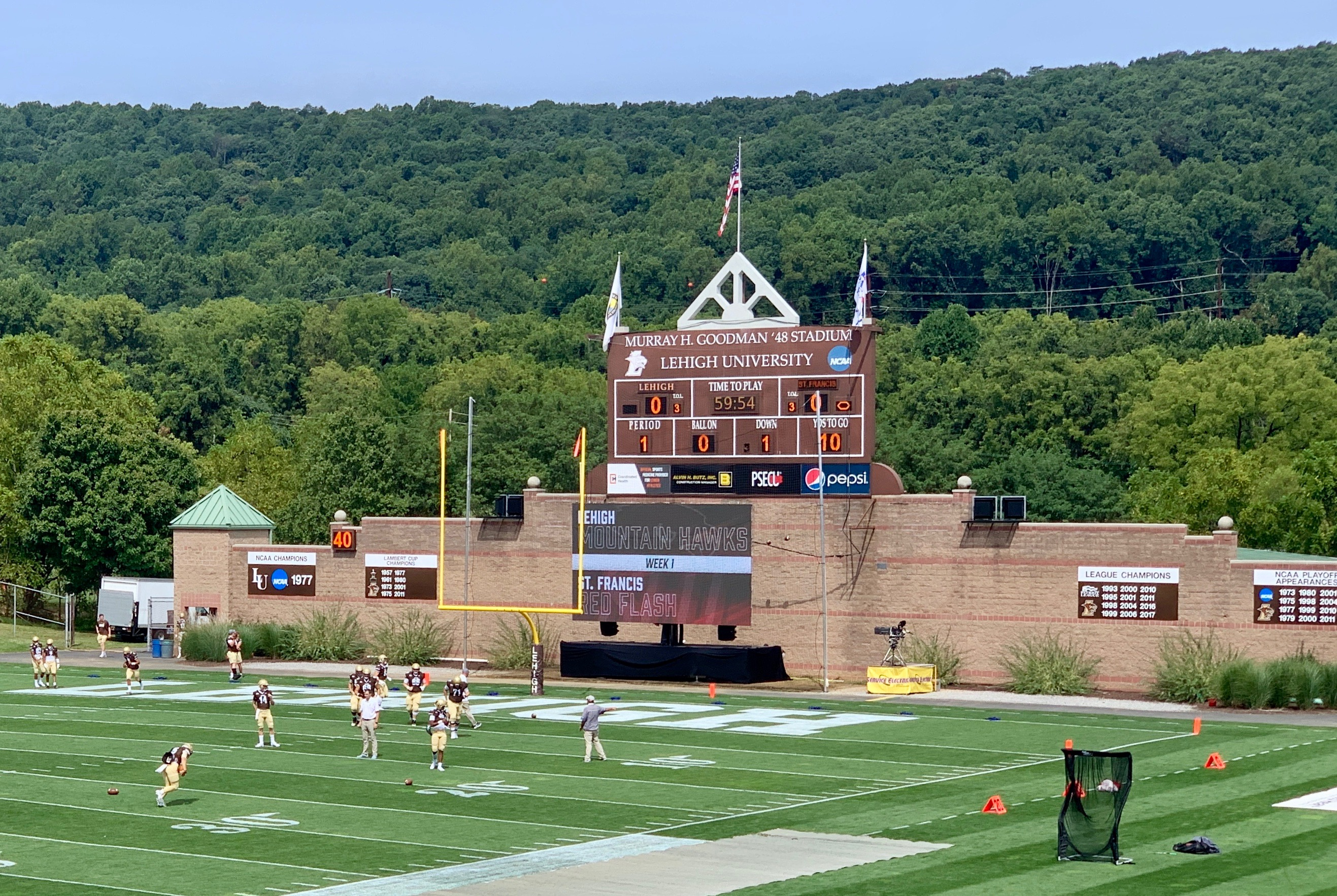
Northern end of the stadium and the scoreboard

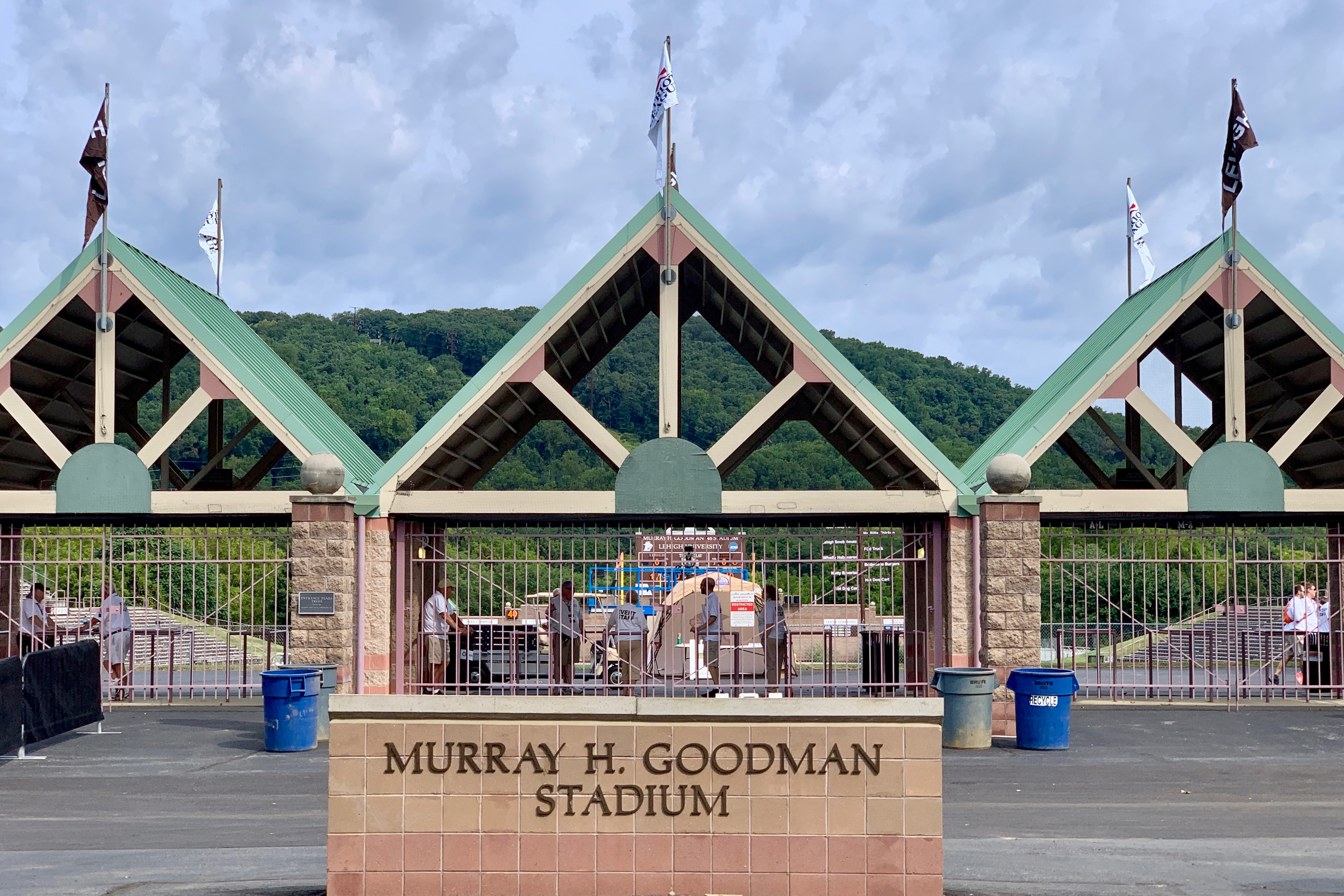
Entrance gates to the stadium

== See also ==
- List of NCAA Division I FCS football stadiums
