= Albertus L. Meyers Bridge =

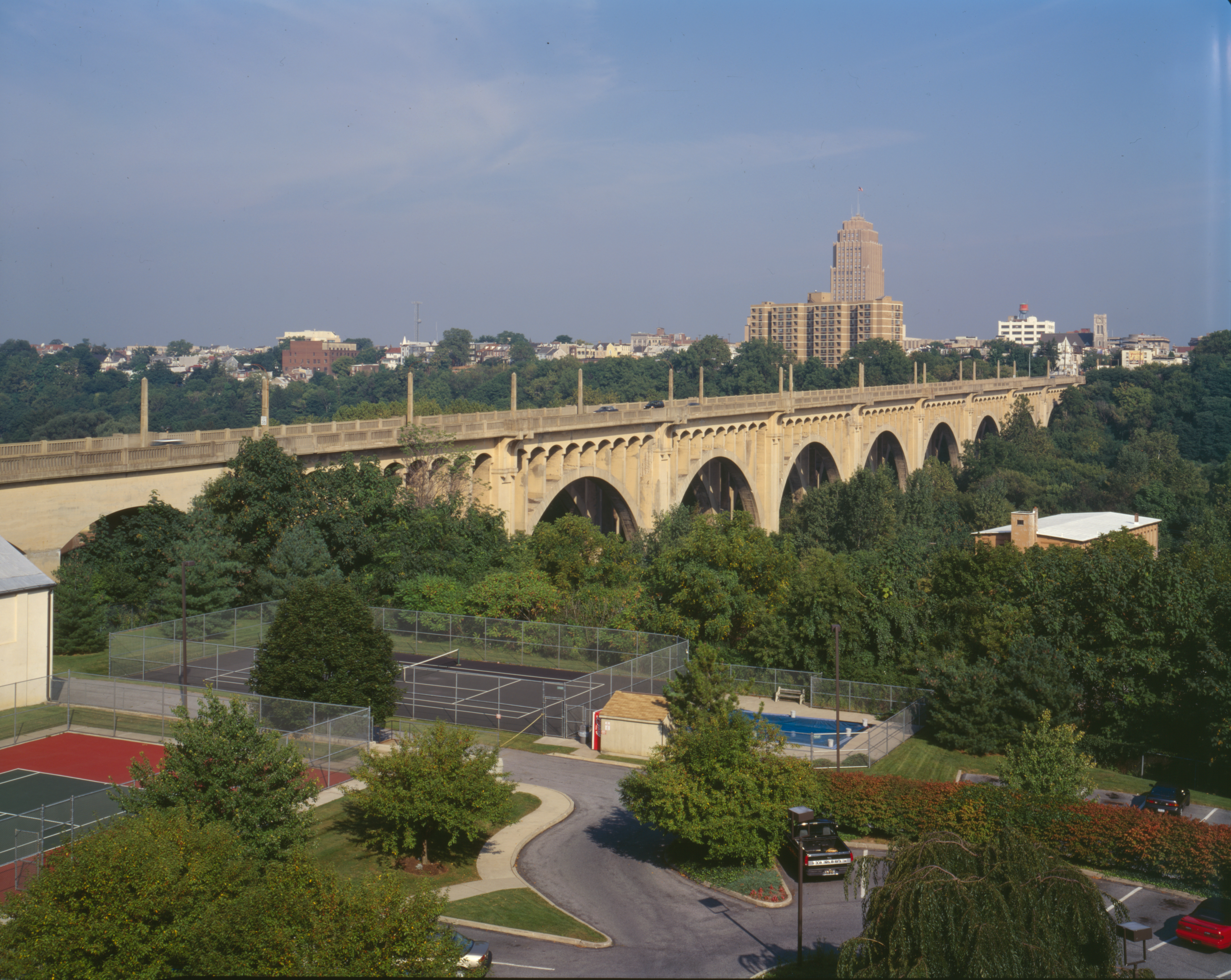
- Albertus L. Meyers Bridge in May 2007
- Coordinates: 40.5963°N 75.4712°W
- Carries: Two lanes northbound and one lane southbound of 8th Street, from Union Street to Lehigh Street, and two sidewalks
- Crosses: Little Lehigh Creek, Harrison Street, and Martin Luther King, Jr. Drive
- Locale: Allentown, Pennsylvania, U.S.
- Official name: Albertus L. Meyers Bridge
- Named for: Albertus L. Meyers
- Maintained by: City of Allentown

Characteristics
- Design: Reinforced concrete open-spandrel arch
- Total length: 2,650 feet (810 m)
- Width: 45 feet (13.72 m) (deck width)
- Height: 138 feet (42 m)
- Longest span: nine 120-foot (36.58 m) broad arches

History
- Opened: November 17, 1913

Statistics
- Daily traffic: 14618
- Toll: Free
- Albertus L. Meyers Bridge
- U.S. National Register of Historic Places
- NRHP reference No.: 88000870
- Added to NRHP: June 22, 1988

Location
- Interactive map of Albertus L. Meyers Bridge

The Albertus L. Meyers Bridge, also known as the Eighth Street Bridge, the South Eighth Street Viaduct, and unsigned as SR 2055, is a reinforced concrete open-spandrel arch bridge located in Allentown, Pennsylvania. The bridge is "one of the earliest surviving examples of monumental, reinforced concrete construction," according to the American Society of Civil Engineers.

Upon its opening on November 17, 1913, the bridge, then known as the Eighth Street Bridge, was the longest and highest concrete bridge in the world.

The bridge spans the Little Lehigh Creek, linking Center City Allentown with Allentown's South Side. The bridge has seventeen spans and is longer than the more massive Tunkhannock Viaduct of the same type.

In 1974, the bridge was renamed in honor Albertus L. Meyers, who served as bandmaster of the Allentown Band for 50 years, from 1926 to 1976.

== History ==
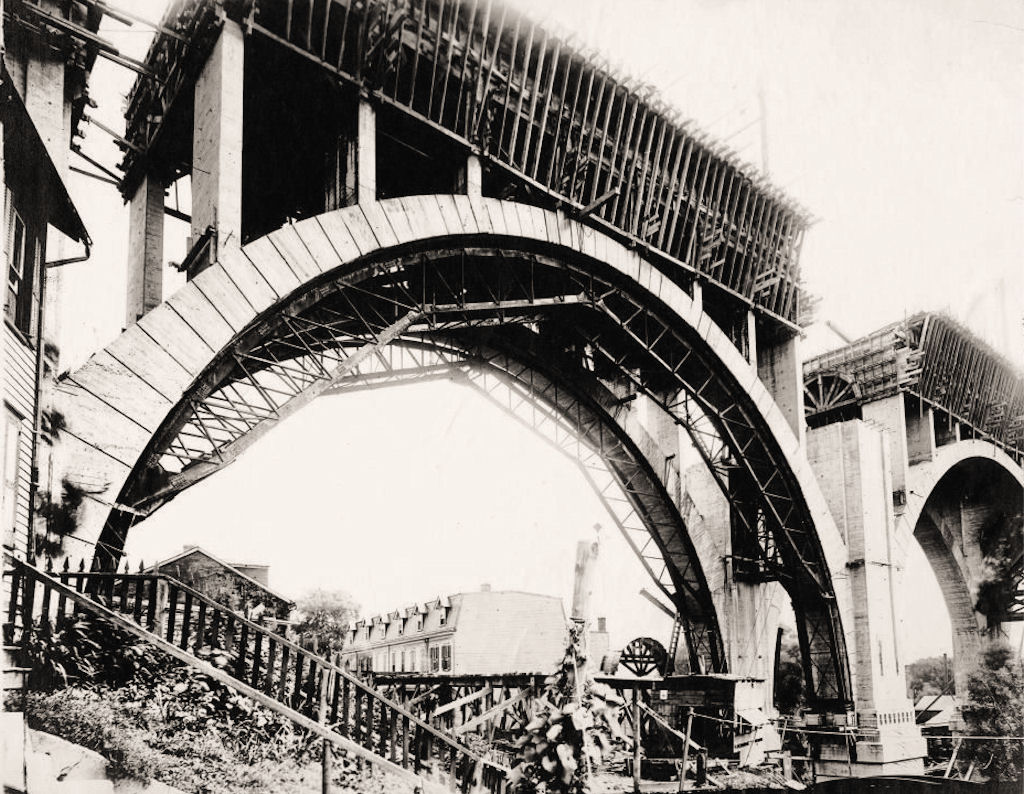
The bridge under construction in 1912

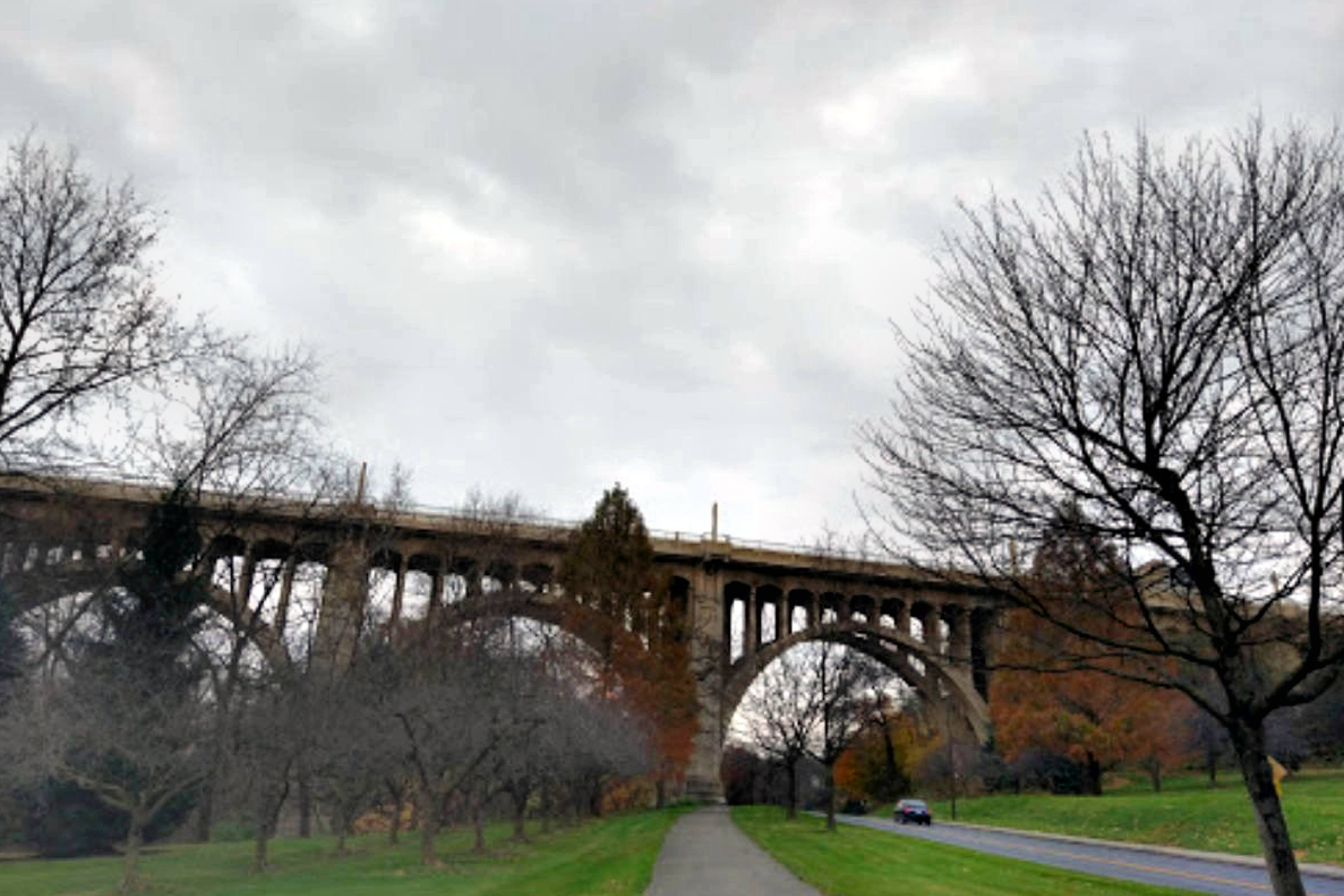
Albertus L. Meyers Bridge in Allentown in 2021

=== Planning and development ===
In 1911, the Lehigh Valley Transit Company in Allentown organized the Allentown Bridge Company for the sole purpose of "erecting, constructing and maintaining a bridge and approaches thereto over the Little Lehigh Creek." The bridge was designed by the engineering firm of Benjamin H. Davis and built by McArthur Brothers of New York City.

Costing in excess of $500,000, (Note: equivalent to $16.3 million in 2025 adjusted for inflation) construction of the bridge lasted from July 1, 1912 to November 17, 1913 and required 29,500 cubic yards (22,600 m^{3}) of concrete and 1,100,000 pounds (500,000 kg) of metal reinforcing rods. The bridge spans the Little Lehigh Creek for a total length of 2,600'-0". It is an average of 38'-0" feet wide with two 16-0" travel lanes and two sidewalks. The main structure spanning Little Lehigh Creek consists of nine open-spandrel concrete deck arch spans, and there are eight closed-spandrel concrete deck arch approach spans.

=== Opening ===
Upon its November 17, 1913 opening, the bridge, then known as the Eighth Street Bridge, was the longest and highest concrete bridge in the world.

From its opening until the 1950s, the structure operated as a toll bridge with an automobile toll of five cents. (It also had a narrow concrete pedestrian-walk on the east edge of the bridge with a small wooden box where pedestrians could deposit their toll.)

=== Electric street car service ===
The Liberty Bell Line, Lehigh Valley Transit's electric street car line, which ran from Allentown to Quakertown, Sellersville, Lansdale, Norristown and Philadelphia, ran across the bridge until that interurban service was discontinued on September 6, 1951. The concrete standards that once supported the trolley wire are still standing on the bridge to this day.

=== Albertus L. Meyers Bridge renaming ===
In 1974, the Eighth Street Bridge was formally renamed the Albertus L. Meyers Bridge in honor of Albertus L. Meyers, a conductor of the Allentown Band and a cornet player in John Philip Sousa's band. As a boy, Meyers played in the Allentown Band at the 1913 opening of the bridge that now bears his name.

=== National Register of Historic Places designation ===
On June 22, 1988, the Albertus L. Meyers Bridge was added to the U.S. National Register of Historic Places.

== See also ==
- List of bridges documented by the Historic American Engineering Record in Pennsylvania
- List of historic places in Allentown, Pennsylvania
