= Charles Cushing =

American composer, band director, and professor

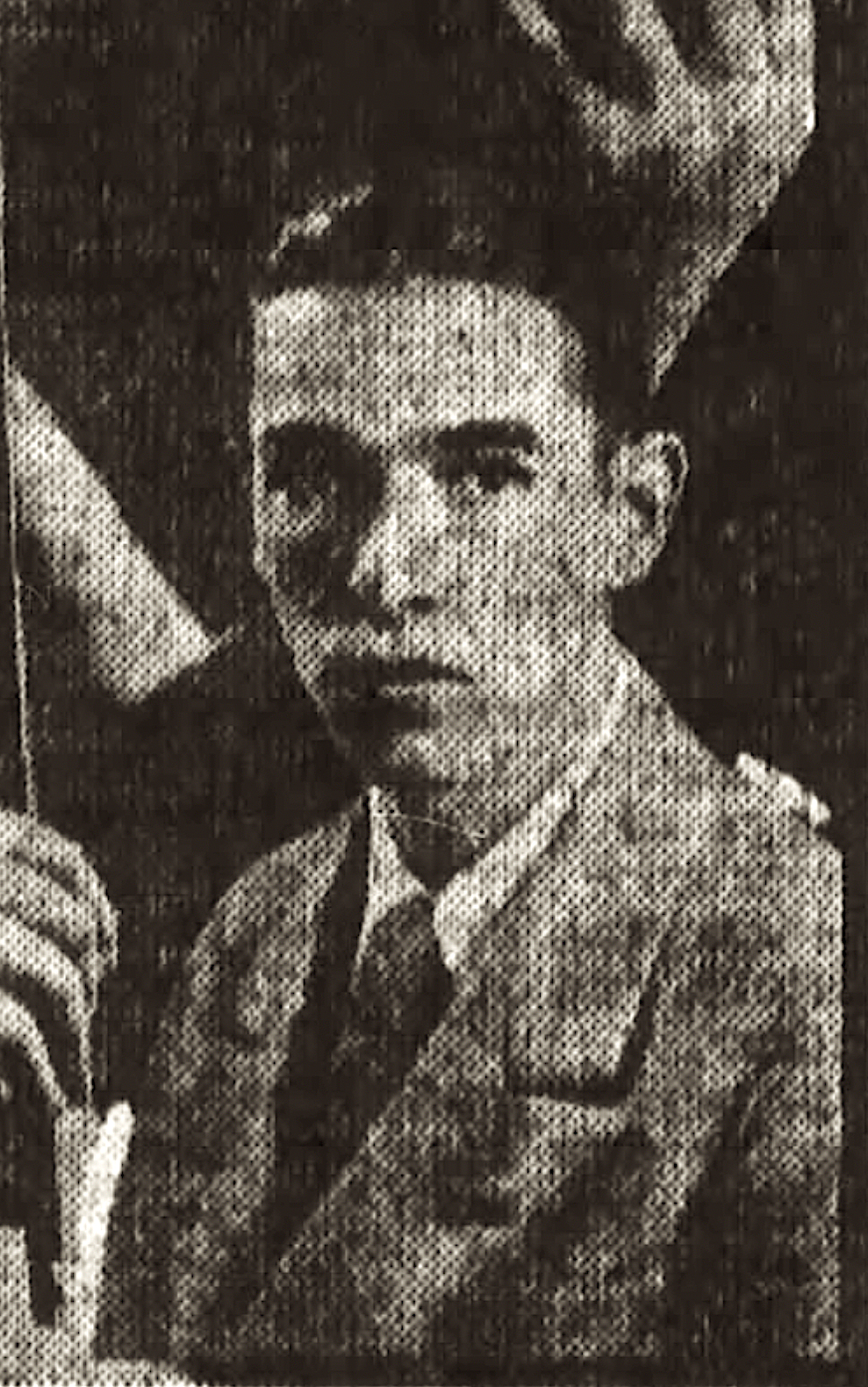
Charles Cushing in 1929.

Charles Cook Cushing (December 8, 1905 – April 14, 1982) was an American composer, band director, and professor of music.

== Early life and education ==
The son of Henry D. Cushing, Charles Cook Cushing was born in Oakland, California on December 8, 1905. He displayed a strong talent for music as a young school boy. In his youth he studied music in Oakland with Cora W. Jenkins who founded a music school in Oakland in 1898, and was one of the few teachers in the region to encourage music composition. He graduated from Oakland Technical High School in 1923 by which time he had already gained a positive local reputation as a conductor of local music groups and composer.

While in high school Cushing played first violin in a local string quartet, and took classes in orchestration and conducting. After graduation he continued to study at the Jenkins School of Music in Oakland before pursuing further training at the University of California, Berkeley (UCB) where he graduated with a bachelors degree in 1928. His undergraduate studies at Berkeley were enabled by winning the Henry Morgan Holbrook Scholarship. One of his professors was concert trombonist and timpanist Modeste Eugene Alloo (1884-1975) who led the university's band which Cushing conducted in concerts under Alloo's guidance. He also studied with Glen Haydon at Berkeley.

After earning his undergraduate diploma, Cushing remained at UCB for graduate studies during which time he concurrently taught on the faculty of the Jenkins Schools of Music. He earned a Master's degree from UCB in 1929 with his final master's degree composition project being a "String Quartet in F minor" which was premiered on the radio in June 1929. During his studies at UCB he was encouraged by visiting French Composer Charles Koechlin during the summers of 1928 and 1929. He won the George Ladd Prix de Paris prize, allowing him to study with Nadia Boulanger at the École Normale de Musique in Paris for two years.

== Later life and career ==
In 1935 Cushing married Charlotte Crosby Cerf. He began teaching music at the University of California, Berkeley in 1931. Served as the Director of the Cal Band in from 1934 to 1952. Taught as a full professor from 1948 through 1968. In 1952 he was honored by the Government of France by being made a Knight of the Legion of Honour. He received numerous commissions during his career, including composing Angel Camp for the United States Military Academy for its 150th anniversary in 1952.

Friend of Igor Stravinsky. Notable students include Jonathan Elkus, Roger Nixon and Loren Rush.

Cushing died at Alta Bates Hospital in Berkeley, California on April 14, 1982 at the age of 76.

== Selected works ==
- Carmen saeculare for chorus and orchestra (1935)
- Angel Camp for Band (1952)
- Cereus, Poem for Orchestra (1959)
- Divertimento for String Orchestra
- Piece for Clarinet and Piano
- Pas de Deux
- Petite Suite for symphonic Band (Composer: Béla Bartók Arranger: Charles Cushing)
