= Jonathan Elkus =

Jonathan Elkus (born August 8, 1931) is an American composer, arranger, editor, author, conductor, and teacher.

== Early life and education ==
Elkus was born in San Francisco, the son of Albert Elkus. He studied composition at University of California, Berkeley (BA 1953) with Charles Cushing and William Denny, at Stanford University (MA 1957) with Ernst Bacon and Leonard Ratner, and at Mills College (1957) with Darius Milhaud.

== Career ==
From 1957 to 1973, Elkus taught at Lehigh University, where he also conducted Marching 97, the university band. In 1979, he became the director of music and chair of humanities at Cape Cod Academy. He was appointed Lecturer in Music and Director of Bands at University of California, Davis in 1993, retiring in 2003.

Elkus founded Overland Music Distributors in 1984. They published books and music by varying composers including Elinor Armer, Cushing, and Ali Akbar Khan. He now serves as editorial consultant to Subito Music Corporation, its successor.

Elkus has been a guest conductor with concert bands and wind ensembles throughout the United States.

In 2002, he was presented with the Edwin Franko Goldman Memorial Citation of the American Bandmasters Association in recognition of his contribution to bands and band music in America.

=== Works ===
Elkus has focused on expanding the repertory for concert band; numerous compositions and arrangements for this ensemble have been published and recorded.

Elkus has composed over a dozen works for the stage, in addition to incidental music for plays and numbers for musical revues. His two best known are conceived for performance by children: Tom Sawyer (1953) and Treasure Island (1961). In Tom Sawyer, Elkus uses much of Mark Twain’s original dialogue. The composer’s intent in this musical adaptation was, like Twain’s, to “remind adults of what they once were and how they thought and felt”. The musical style is essentially tonal, evoking the work’s period setting through galops and marches; instrumental interludes are highly programmatic, and choral ensembles make use of original onomatopoeic devices. The music of Treasure Island is more adventurous; colorful hornpipes are used, but the language is richly chromatic and there is considerable rhythmic intensity.

Through his editorial work, Elkus has focused on the music of Charles Ives. He is an editor of the Charles Ives Society’s critical editions of the complete works and has transcribed works of Ives for the U.S. Marine Band. In 1974 he authored the monograph Charles Ives and the American Band Tradition.
