= Ernst Bacon =

American composer and musician (1898–1990)

- Born: Ernst Lecher Bacon; May 26, 1898; Chicago, Illinois, U.S.
- Died: March 16, 1990 (aged 91); Orinda, California, U.S.
- Occupations: Composer, pianist and conductor
- Spouses: Mary Prentice Lillie; Analee Camp; Margaret Camp; Ellen Bacon

Notes
- influenced by Karl Weigl and Ernest Bloch; influenced Carlisle Floyd and Jake Heggie

Ernst Lecher Bacon (May 26, 1898 – March 16, 1990) was an American composer, pianist, and conductor. A prolific composer, Bacon wrote over 250 songs over his career. He was awarded three Guggenheim Fellowships and a Pulitzer Scholarship in 1932 for his Second Symphony.

== Personal life ==
Bacon was born in Chicago, Illinois, on May 26, 1898 to Marie von Rosthorn Bacon (sister of Alfons von Rosthorn and Arthur von Rosthorn) and Dr. Charles S. Bacon. At the age of 19, he enrolled at Northwestern University where he pursued a degree in mathematics. After three years of study, he moved to the University of Chicago. Bacon finished his education at the University of California at Berkeley, where he received a master's degree for the composition of The Song of the Preacher in 1935.

Bacon was married four times. He married his first wife, Mary Prentice Lillie, granddaughter of Richard Teller Crane, in 1927. They had two children, Margaret and Joseph. His second wife was cellist Analee Camp. They had two sons, Paul and Arthur. Paul died at the age of 18, which had a deep and lasting effect on Bacon. In 1952, he married his third wife, Peggy Camp (no relation to Anna Lee). He met his fourth wife Ellen Wendt, a soprano singer, when he was 70 and she was 26, at 10,000 feet on a Sierra Club trip in Kings Canyon National Park in 1968, four years after he retired from Syracuse University. Despite the age gap, they shared a love for classical music and writers like Emerson and Thoreau. He married her in 1971. Their son David was born in 1973.

Bacon died in 1990 at age 91 in Orinda, California.

== Career ==
At the age of 19, Bacon wrote a complex treatise entitled "Our Musical Idiom," which explored all possible harmonies within Equal Temperament and gave the numbers of chords available for each cardinality (thereby anticipating the later work of Allen Forte). However, when he began to compose music in his 20s, he rejected a purely cerebral approach. He took the position that music is an art, not a science, and that its source should be human and imaginative, rather than abstract and analytical. Bacon was self-taught in composition, except for two years of study with Karl Weigl in Vienna, Austria. Experiencing the depression of post-war Europe first hand, he understood that the avant-garde movement reflected the pessimism of its origins. Bacon set out instead to write music that expressed the vitality and affirmation of his own country.

He composed a large number of art songs, and much other music including chamber, orchestral, and choral works. Aside from his musical and literary composition, Bacon held a number of positions that took him across the country. From 1925 to 1927, Bacon was an opera coach at the Eastman School of Music. In 1928 Bacon traveled from New York to California to take up a position at the San Francisco Conservatory of Music where he served until 1930. In 1935, Bacon was the guest conductor at the first Carmel Bach Festival in California. A year later he was supervising the Works Progress Administration (WPA) Federal Music Project and conducting the San Francisco Symphony.

From 1938 to 1945, he was dean and professor of piano at Converse College in Spartanburg, South Carolina. From 1945 to 1947, he was director of the school of music, and from 1947 to 1963 he was professor and composer in residence at Syracuse University. He was professor emeritus from 1964. Among his students were Jonathan Elkus, Carlisle Floyd, David N. Johnson, and Donald Martino. He continued to work until shortly before his death in 1990.

== Settings ==
Bacon composed settings to the works by Matthew Arnold, William Blake, Emily Brontë, Elizabeth Barrett Browning, Witter Bynner, Robert Burns, Helena Carus, Emily Dickinson, Benjamin Franklin, Goethe, Heinrich Heine, Paul Horgan, A. E. Housman, Nicolaus Lenau, Cornel Lengyel, Herman Melville, Carl Sandberg, William Shakespeare, Robert Louis Stevenson, Sara Teasdale, and Walt Whitman.

== Discography ==
- ERNST BACON THE COMPLETE WORKS FOR SOLO GUITAR Azica Records, ACD-71294, Bradley Colten, Guitar.
- FORGOTTEN AMERICANS, Arabesque Recordings Z6823, Includes: "A Life," Joel Krosnick, cello and Gilbert Kalish, piano.
- ABRAHAM LINCOLN PORTRAITS, Naxos 8.559373-74, Nashville Symphony, Leonard Slatkin, conductor, Includes: "Ford’s Theatre: A Few Glimpses of Easter Week, 1865."
- THE BACK OF BEYOND, Music for Flute and Piano, Lea Kibler, Flute; Irina Viritch, Piano, Includes: "Buncombe County, N.C.," "Burnt Cabin Branch," "Holbert's Cove."
- FOND AFFECTION, CRI CD 890 (now at New World Records), 25 Bacon settings: Janet Brown, soprano; Herbert Burtis piano, Willam Sharp, baritone; John Musto, piano, Amy Burton, soprano; John Musto, piano, Sonata for Violin and Piano (1983) – Ronald Copes, violin; Alan Feinberg, piano.
- REMEMBERING ANSEL ADAMS AND OTHER WORKS, CRI CD 779 (now at New World Records), Remembering Ansel Adams (1985) – Richard Stoltzman, clarinet; Warsaw Philharmonic, Jerzy Swoboda, conductor, Sonata for Cello and Piano (1948) – Bernard Greenhouse, cello; Menahem Pressler, piano, Collected Short Piano Works (1950–1965) – Emily Corbato, piano, Tumbleweeds (1979) Dorothy Bales, violin; Allan Sly, piano.
- SONGS OF CHARLES IVES AND ERNST BACON, CRI CD 675 (now at New World Records), Contains 21 Bacon settings, Recorded in 1954 and 1964 with Helen Boatwright, soprano and Ernst Bacon at the piano for his own songs.
- ROSI & TONI GRUNSCHLAG PIANO DUO, CRI CD 606 (now at New World Records), Includes: "Coal-Scuttle Blues," (by Bacon and Otto Lueining).
- THE LISTENERS, New World Records, William Parker, baritone, Includes: "Billy in the Darbies."
- SHAKESPEARE AND THE MODERN COMPOSER, Soundmark, The Louisville Orchestra, Robert Whitney, Jorge Mester, "The Enchanted Isle/The Tempest."
- TRIOS FROM THE CITY OF BIG SHOULDERS, Cedille CDR90000203 (2021), Lincoln Trio, includes Trio no. 2 for violin, cello, and piano (1987)

== Research resources ==
- Bacon's Songs The Lied and Art Songs Texts page created and maintained from Emily Ezust
- Ernst Bacon Papers, 1933–1990 (1.25 linear ft.) at the Department of Special Collections and University Archives at Stanford University Libraries
- Ernst Bacon Papers at the Special Collections Research Center at Syracuse University
- Ernst Bacon Society
- Ernst Bacon Collection at the Howard Gotlieb Archival Research Center at Boston University
- Bacon (Ernst) Papers, 1926–1987 (3.25 linear ft.) at the Jean Hargrove Music Library at the University of California, Berkeley
