= Allentown Band =

Musical group in Allentown, Pennsylvanis, US

The earliest known photograph of the Allentown Band in 1872

The Allentown Band in 1880

The Allentown Band in 1886

The Allentown Band in 1887

The Allentown Band in 1889

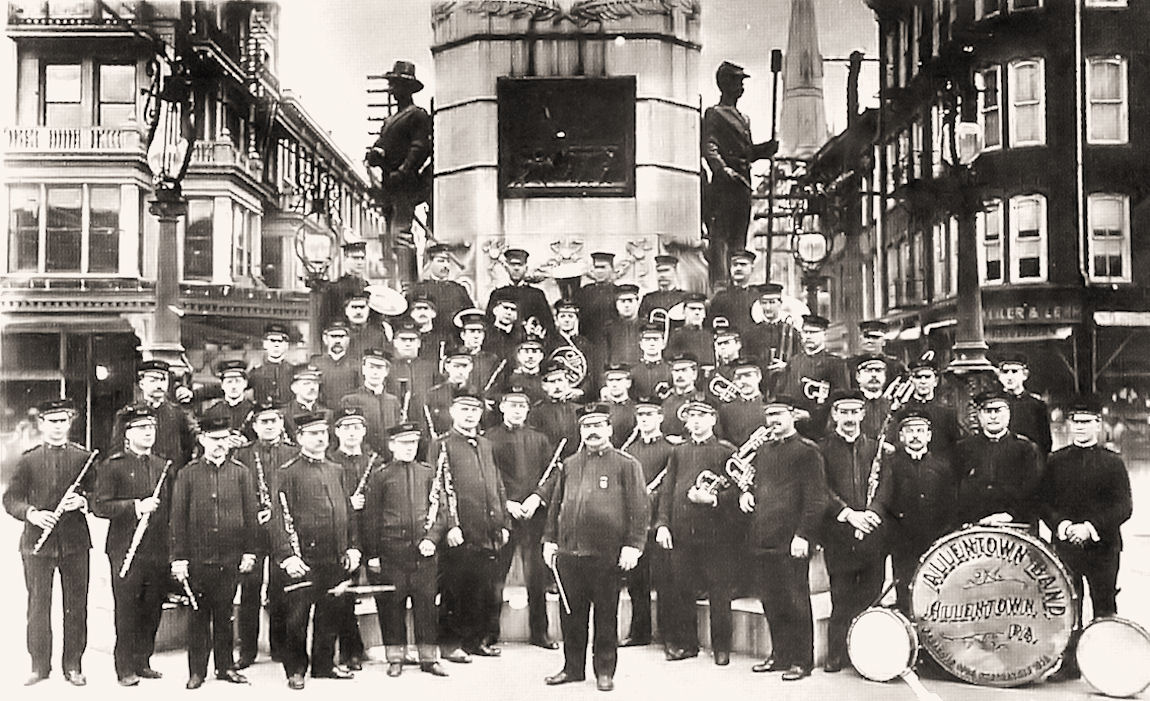
Sllentown Band at the Soldiers and Sailors Monument in Center City Allentown in 1915

The Allentown Band is a civilian concert band based in Allentown, Pennsylvania. It is the oldest civilian concert band in the United States, having been in continuous existence since its first documented performance on July 4, 1828, although its origins may trace back to as early as 1822.

== History ==
=== 19th century ===
The band was known as the Northampton Band until 1838 when the town was officially renamed Allentown. Other names included the Allentown Brass Band (1850-1862) and the Lehigh Cornet Band (1862-1864). Around 1876, the band began using its current name.

Conductor Albertus L. Meyers was a close friend of famed conductor and bandleader John Philip Sousa, who recruited at least twenty members of the Allentown Band for his own organization.

Allentown Band has a long history of performing for visiting dignitaries and dedications. The band has performed for ten United States presidents, including Martin Van Buren during his visit to the area on June 26, 1839, marching in Theodore Roosevelt's inaugural parade in 1901, and Jimmy Carter.

In 1861, the band performed at Independence Hall in Philadelphia, in a ceremony presided over by then-President Abraham Lincoln. The band performed at both the dedication of Allentown's Soldiers and Sailors Monument in 1899, and its centennial celebration in 1999. The band also performed at the dedication of Allentown's Eighth Street Bridge in 1913, which was later renamed Albertus L. Meyers Bridge in 1974 in honor of Albertus L. Meyers, a former conductor of Allentown Band.

=== 20th century ===
The band typically performs about 45 concerts per year. Many of these performances take place in Allentown's West Park, where an average of 2,500 people attend each concert. West Park has long been home to the Allentown Band. The West Park bandshell, designed by Philadelphia architect Horace Trumbauer, who designed the bandshell at Willow Grove Park, was dedicated on September 17, 1908. The Allentown Band performed at the dedication ceremony, playing Rossini's overture to Semiramide.

The bandshell was later named the Goldman Bandshell in honor of Edwin Franko Goldman, noted band composer and founder of the Goldman Band.

In 1927, Goldman was the first guest conductor of the Allentown Band. He also conducted Allentown High School's band in the 1930s.

The Allentown Band was the subject of a segment on the CBS News Sunday Morning television show which aired on July 7, 1991.

=== 21st century ===
In 2003, the band was the subject of a WLVT-TV-produced documentary, The Allentown Band, 175 Years of Musical Memories. The same year, a book, The Band Plays On!: The Allentown Band's 175th Anniversary, was published, written by conductor Ronald Demkee.

== Conductors ==
- 1828 to 1851: (Unknown)
- 1851 to 1852: Anthony Heinicke
- 1853 to 1860: Major Amos Ettinger
- 1861 to 1878: William Minninger
- 1879: Lucas Westmeyer
- 1880 to 1885: Prof. Waldemar Grossman
- 1886 to 1926: Martin Klingler
- 1926 to 1976: Albertus ("Bert") L. Meyers
- 1977: Ronald Sherry
- 1978 to Present: Ronald Demkee

== Discography ==
- Our Band Heritage, Volume 1: Revisited
- Our Band Heritage, Volume 2: Revisited
- Our Band Heritage, Volume 3
- Our Band Heritage, Volume 4
- Our Band Heritage, Volume 5
- Our Band Heritage, Volume 6: A Tribute to John Philip Sousa
- Our Band Heritage, Volume 7: A Tribute to Patrick Sarsfield Gilmore
- Our Band Heritage, Volume 8: Remembrance of Switzerland
- Our Band Heritage, Volume 9: Salute to Bert Meyers
- Our Band Heritage, Volume 10: America's Oldest
- Our Band Heritage, Volume 11: Salute to Martin Klinger
- Our Band Heritage, Volume 12: Band Concert
- Our Band Heritage, Volume 13: Spectacular
- Our Band Heritage, Volume 14: Ye Ancients
- Our Band Heritage, Volume 15: Virtuoso! The Rare and Glorious Sound of Frank Kaderabek
- Our Band Heritage, Volume 16: Americans We
- Our Band Heritage, Volume 17: Seasons Greetings
- Our Band Heritage, Volume 18: Band on Broadway
- Our Band Heritage, Volume 19: Sesquicentennial: The Music of John Philip Sousa
- Our Band Heritage, Volume 20: A World of Marches
- Our Band Heritage, Volume 21: Blockbusters - The Allentown Band & Allen Organ
- Our Band Heritage, Volume 22: Kaleidoscope - A Collage of Calliet Classics
- Our Band Heritage, Volume 23: 180th Anniversary
- Our Band Heritage, Volume 24: Echoes of the 1860s
- Our Band Heritage, Volume 25: Lest We Forget...
- Our Band Heritage, Volume 26: Pennsylvania Pioneers
- Our Band Heritage, Volume 27: Morton Gould
- Our Band Heritage, Volume 28: Leroy Anderson
- Our Band Heritage, Volume 29: Sousa
- Our Band Heritage, Volume 30: Cartoon Classics
- Our Band Heritage, Volume 31: Tribute to John Williams
