= Lehigh University =

Private university in Bethlehem, Pennsylvania, US

Coordinates: 40°36′22″N 75°22′38″W

- Motto: Homo minister et interpres naturae (Latin)
- Motto in English: "Man, the servant and interpreter of nature"
- Type: Private research university
- Established: July 27, 1865; 161 years ago
- Founder: Asa Packer
- Accreditation: MSCHE
- Academic affiliations: NAICU; ORAU; LVAIC; UNAI; Space-grant
- Endowment: $2 billion (2025)
- President: Joseph J. Helble
- Provost: Nathan Urban
- Faculty: 681 (2023)
- Total staff: 1,997 (2023)
- Students: 7,909 (2024)
- Undergraduates: 5,986 (2024)
- Postgraduates: 1,923 (2024)
- Location: Bethlehem, Pennsylvania, United States
- Campus: 2,350 acres (950 ha); Small city
- Colors: Brown and white
- Nickname: Mountain Hawks
- Sporting affiliations: NCAA Division I FCS – Patriot League; EIWA; MARC; ACHA; IHSA; USCSA
- Mascot: Clutch the Mountain Hawk
- Website: www.lehigh.edu

Lehigh University (LU) is a private research university in Bethlehem, Pennsylvania, United States. The university was established in 1865 by businessman Asa Packer. Lehigh University's undergraduate programs have been coeducational since the 1971–72 academic year. As of 2022, the university had 5,911 undergraduate students and 1,781 graduate students. The university is classified as "Doctoral Universities R1: Very High Research Activity".

== History ==
Lehigh University was founded by Asa Packer on July 27, 1865 as an all boys University with the express goal of providing a "thorough education" in civil engineering, mechanical engineering, mining engineering, chemistry, metallurgy, the classics, and general literature. At the time of its foundation any male over the age of 16 could attend if they demonstrated a complete knowledge of arithmetic and passed a test on both Latin and ancient Greek grammar and literature.

== Campuses ==
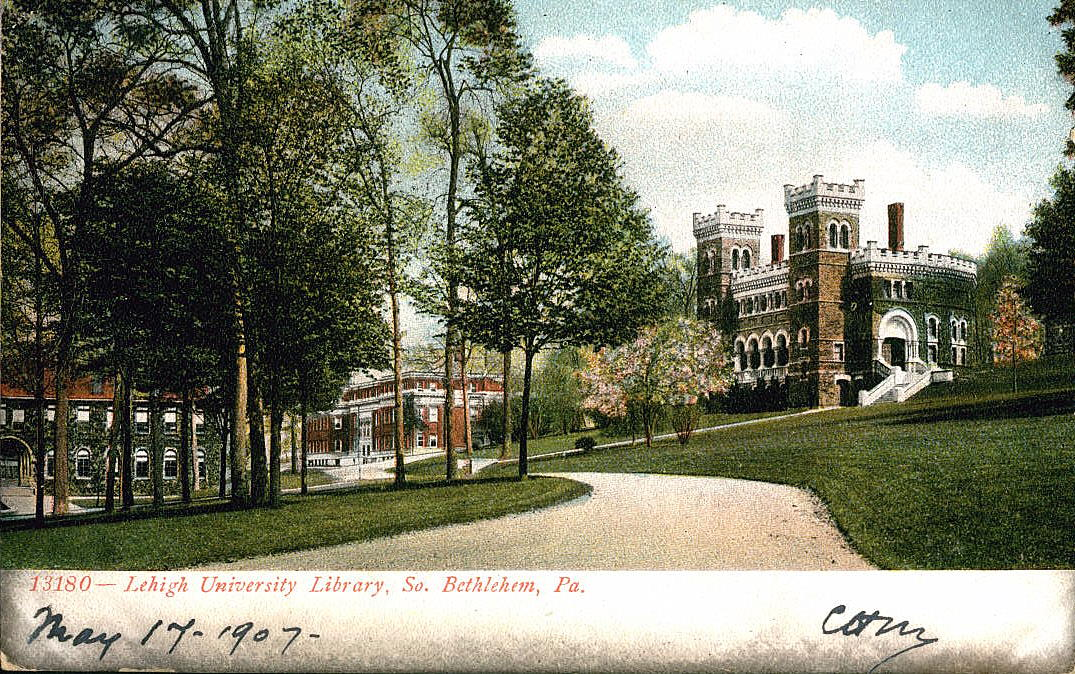
An illustrated postcard of Lehigh University's campus in Bethlehem, Pennsylvania in 1907

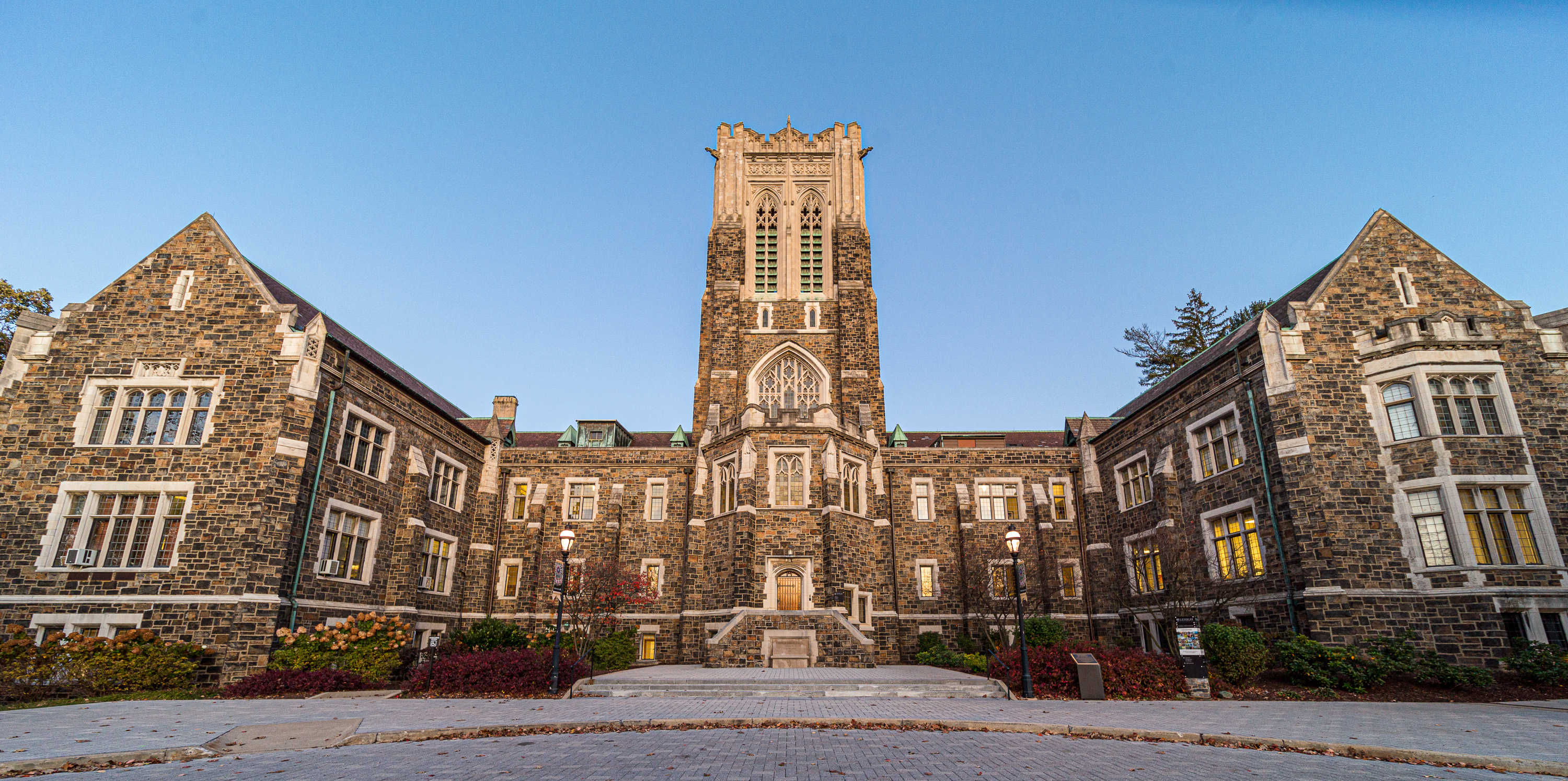
Alumni Memorial Building in November 2019

Lehigh University is located in Bethlehem, Pennsylvania, in the historically industrial Lehigh Valley region of eastern Pennsylvania. As of 2025, Lehigh encompasses 2,350 acres (9.5 km^{2}), including 180 acres (0.73 km^{2}) of recreational and playing fields, and 150 buildings comprising four million square feet of floor space.

It is organized into three contiguous campuses on and around South Mountain, including:

- The Asa Packer Campus, built into the northern slope of the mountain, the university's original and primary campus;
- The Mountaintop Campus, atop South Mountain, including intramural sports fields, Imbt Laboratories, and Iacocca Hall; and
- The Murray H. Goodman Campus, immediately south in Lower Saucon, including Goodman Stadium and most of Lehigh University's sports facilities.

In May 2012, Lehigh was the beneficiary of a gift of 755 acres of property in nearby Upper Saucon Township, Pennsylvania from the Donald B. and Dorothy L. Stabler Foundation. The gift from the estate of the long-time benefactor allowed the university to expand to its current size of 2,350 acres across all its campuses, and to consider new long-term potential uses for the university's new properties.

== Administration ==
As a private institution, Lehigh University is governed by its board of trustees, established in 1866.

=== Student governance ===
In 1988, a student senate was created at the university to act as a governing body for undergraduate students, though it is empowered only to offer recommendations to the university's board. Still, the student senate still has an impact as it determines which clubs receive funding and which are authorized to be listed as official university clubs. A separate student senate exists for graduate students.

== Academics ==
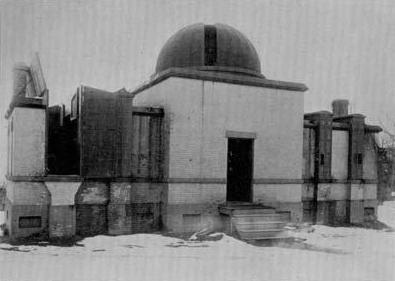
Sayre Observatory, an 1896 donation to the university

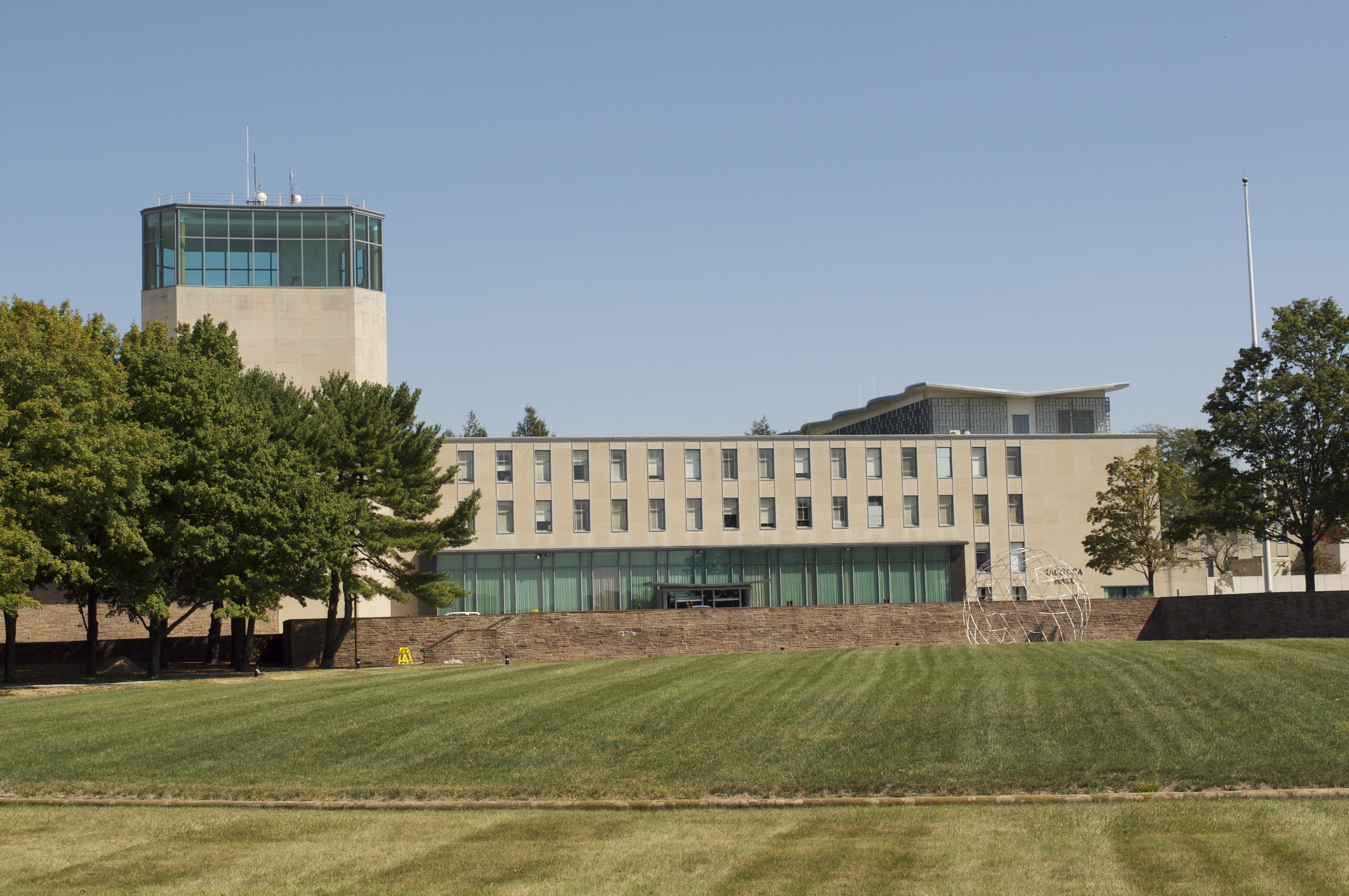
Iacocca Hall, named in honor of Lehigh University alumnus Lee Iacocca

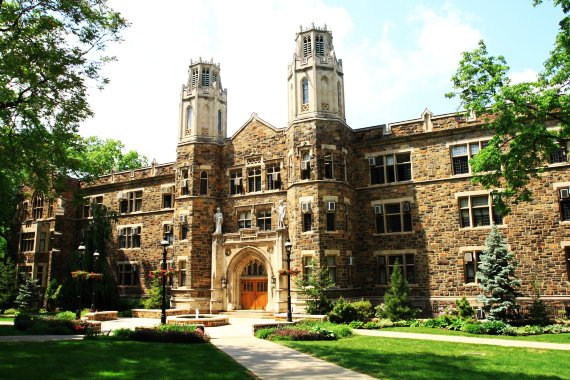
The university's Packard Laboratory in November 2015

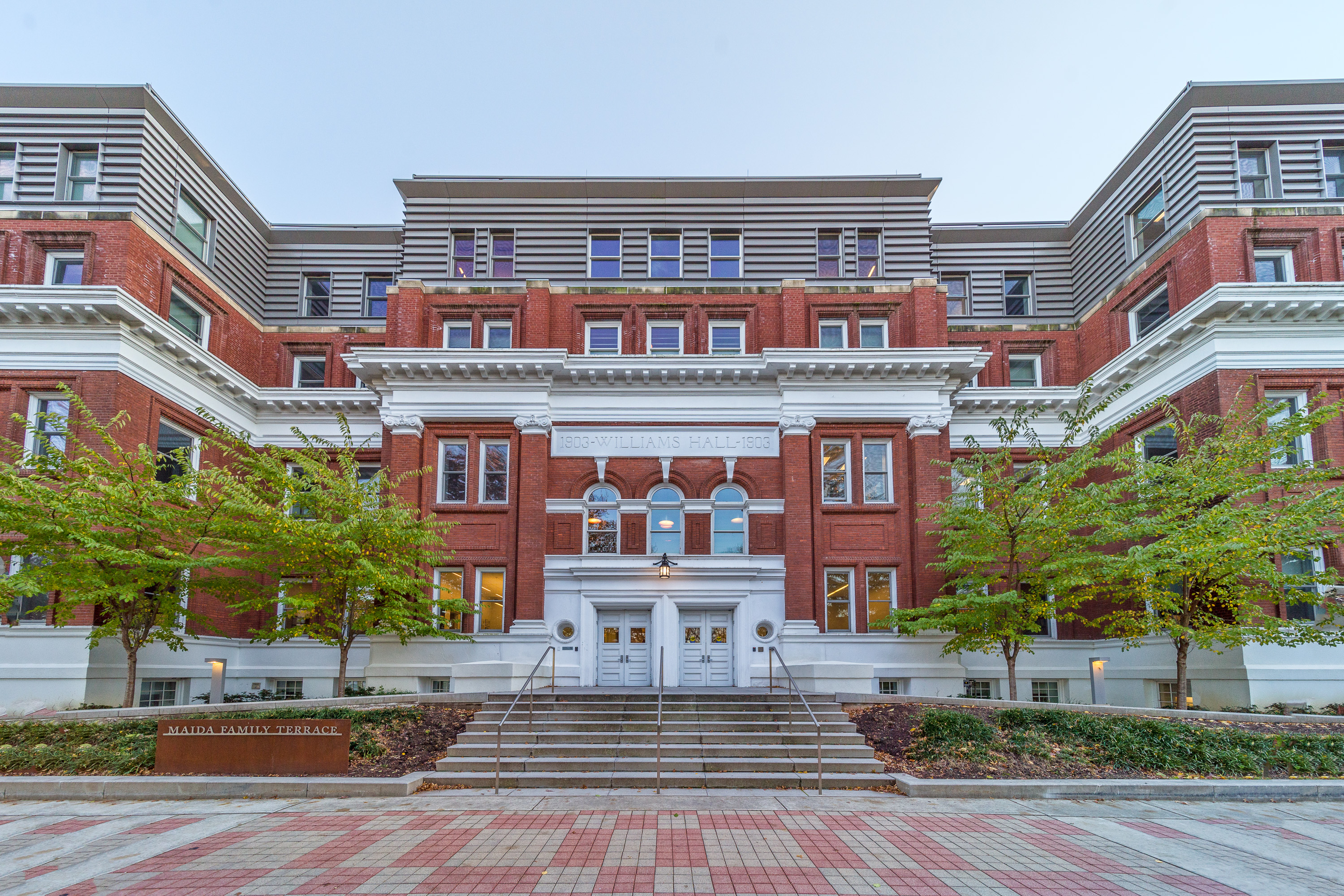
Williams Hall in November 2019

As of 2022, Lehigh has 584 full-time faculty members, with 95% holding a doctorate degree or the highest degree in their field.

The university offers undergraduate enrollment to all its colleges except its College of Education. The university operates on a semester system.

=== Colleges ===
==== College of Arts and Sciences ====
Based in Maginnes Hall, the College of Arts and Sciences offers a variety of humanities courses and visual arts programs and many music programs, including a marching band, the Wind Ensemble, and the Philharmonic orchestra. It has a dedicated Humanities Center, which is the site for many literature and other arts-based programs, including the Drown Writers Series. Lehigh also has a program called ArtsLehigh, oriented towards enhancing interest in the arts on campus.

==== College of Business ====
Lehigh introduced business and economics classes in 1893, with the first dedicated classes in economics being offered in 1897 and the first professor of economics being hired by the school, John L. Stewart, in 1898. Stewart is credited with creating the College of Business in 1918, establishing its original courses and teaching most of the classes himself. The college's inaugural class of 1922 numbered just 77. Through the 1930s the College of Business Administration stayed consistent, with around 10 professors and 350 students, and in 1938 was accredited by the Association to Advance Collegiate Schools of Business, with enrollment that year jumping to 465, or 25% of the total student body. In 1952 the College of Business Administration began offering a five-year course in Industrial engineering and business, as well as graduate courses for Master of Business Administration degrees and was expanded to include Master of Science degrees by 1964. In 1957 the college moved from Coppée Hall to the purpose-built Drown Hall.

==== College of Education ====
More than 7,000 students have received master's, education specialist, Pennsylvania Department of Education teaching certificates and certifications, doctoral degrees, and professional certificates from Lehigh's College of Education as of 2018.

==== P.C. Rossin College of Engineering and Applied Science ====
Graduates of Lehigh's P.C. Rossin College of Engineering and Applied Science invented the escalator and founded Packard Motor Car Company and the companies that built the locks and lockgates of the Panama Canal. Other notable alumni include Roger Penske, Lee Iacocca, John W. Fisher, and Terry Hart. Tau Beta Pi, the engineering honor society, was founded at Lehigh. In 2005, George Tamaro, a Lehigh University master's degree in civil engineering alumnus, was the John Fritz Medal award recipient, issued by the American Association of Engineering Societies.

==== College of Health ====
Lehigh's College of Health offers classes in biostatistics, epidemiology, population health data science, and others related to population health. The college opened on August 21, 2020, and was the first in the world to offer undergraduate, graduate, and executive degrees in population health. It is based at the Health, Science, and Technology (HST) building which opened in January 2022.

=== Centers and Institutes ===
The Martindale Center for the Study of Private Enterprise was founded in 1980 with an endowment from Elizabeth Fairchild Martindale and Harry Turner Martindale '27. It hosts a suite of programs, most notably the Student Associates Honors Program, a highly-selective program which sends 12 juniors to a small-medium economy, tasking them with conducting group and individual research and writing academic articles pertaining to the economy and public policy of the country of study for publication as a volume of the Martindale undergraduate research journal, Perspectives on Business and Economics. The Martindale Center also contains The Microfinance and Microenterprise Program and a partnership with the African Center for Government and Economic Management (ACGEM) in Accra, Ghana.

Other notable research centers include the Center for Catastrophe Modeling and Resilience, the Center for Advanced Technology and Large Structural Systems, the Institute for Cyber Physical Infrastructure and Energy, the Loewy Institute for Materials Processing, and the Baker Institute for Entrepreneurship.

=== Undergraduate admissions ===
Admission to Lehigh University is classified as "more selective" by the Carnegie Classification of Institutions of Higher Education. The Princeton Review gives Lehigh an "Admissions Selectivity Rating" of 95 out of 99.

In 2024, Lehigh University received 20,396 applications and admitted 5,289 students, resulting in an acceptance rate of 25%. Of those admitted, 1,501 students enrolled, yielding a matriculation rate of about 28%. Among the incoming Class of 2028, 50% of students submitted standardized test scores. For these students, the middle 50% SAT scores ranged from 1420 to 1520, and the ACT scores ranged from 32 to 35.

In 2023, the university received 18,415 applications. It extended offers of admission to 5,389 applicants, or 29%, after holistic review that includes examination of academic rigor, performance and admissions test scores. 1,531 accepted students chose to enroll, a yield rate of 28%. Of the 33% of incoming students in 2023 who submitted SAT scores, the interquartile range was 1370–1480; of the 10% of incoming students in 2023 who submitted ACT scores, the interquartile range was 31–33.

=== Rankings ===
Academic rankings

National
- Forbes: 79
- U.S. News & World Report: 44
- Washington Monthly: 29
- WSJ/College Pulse: 14

Global
- ARWU: 701–800
- QS: =668
- THE: 601–800
- U.S. News & World Report: 850

In its 2024 ranking of best U.S. colleges, The Wall Street Journal, which ranks on the basis of student outcomes (70%), learning environment (20%), and diversity (10%), that analysis ranked Lehigh as 14th-best, overall, for that year. In the 2025 edition of "Best Colleges Ranking" published by the U.S. News & World Report, a site which does not report its methodology on its reporting page, Lehigh was ranked 46th (in a tie), in the "National Universities" category, with the following further category rankings: 25th for "Best Undergraduate Teaching", 26th for "Best Value Schools", tied for 51st for "Best Undergraduate Engineering Programs", and 45th for "Most Innovative Schools".

Along with three other Pennsylvania colleges, Dickinson College in Carlisle, Lafayette College in Easton, and Muhlenberg College in Allentown, Lehigh was a 2020 recipient of the Campus Sustainability Achievement Award issued by the Association for the Advancement of Sustainability in Higher Education in commemoration of its participation in the Solar Collaboration Project.

Lehigh University was nationally ranked in 2024, as 1st in "Best Science Lab Facilities", 10th for “Best College Library”, and 15th for "Most Beautiful Campus" according to The Princeton Review. Additionally, it holds the 2nd spot for "Best College Newspaper", 3rd in “Their Students Love These Colleges”, 16th in “Best Career Placement (Private Schools)”, 24th in “Top Green Colleges”, 30th in “Best Value Colleges (Private Schools)”, and ranks 4th for "Lots of Race/Class Interaction".

According to PayScale's 2024 report, Lehigh ranks 1st among schools nationally for business majors by salary potential, with an early career median pay of $95,300 and a mid-career median pay of $194,900. Lehigh ranks 12th among universities for bachelor's degree salary potential, with a mid-career median salary of $147,300. Lehigh University ranks 26th among schools nationally for computer science majors by salary potential and 34th among schools nationally for engineering majors by salary potential.

In the 2024-2025 Forbes rankings of America's Top Colleges, Lehigh is ranked 64th overall, 44th among private colleges, 49th among research universities, and 28th among institutions in the Northeast.

Lehigh University's College of Business is ranked 23rd in Poets&Quants' 2023 list of Best Undergraduate Business Schools. This reflects a rise from 27th place in 2022. Additionally, the university's part-time, online FLEX MBA program is ranked 13th among online MBA programs by Poets&Quants for 2025.

In 2023, U.S. News & World Report has identified Lehigh University's 1-MBA program as ranking 5th in the United States in salary-to-debt ratio. The publication recently evaluated MBA programs by the highest return on investment by examining starting salary-to-debt ratio from its 2023-2024 Best Business Schools (MBA) ranking.

In 2018, U.S. News & World Report ranked Lehigh's part-time MBA program 20th in the nation.

In 2012, BusinessWeek ranked Lehigh's College of Business 31st in the nation among undergraduate business programs. In 2012, BusinessWeek ranked Lehigh the seventh-best overall undergraduate finance program in the nation, and ranked its undergraduate accounting program the 21st-best in the nation.

In 2012, Entrepreneur Magazine and The Princeton Review named Lehigh the 24th- best undergraduate college for entrepreneurship.

== Student life ==
=== Fraternities and sororities ===
A large majority of Lehigh's social fraternities and sororities have their own university-owned houses; most of the fraternities and sororities are located along Upper and Lower Sayre Park Roads in a region known as "The Hill".

Lehigh has a decreasing level of student participation in fraternities and sororities; only about 35% of undergraduates are members of a fraternity or sorority. There are 10 fraternities, all of which are housed on campus, and eight sororities, all of which are housed on campus.

Lehigh's "golden age of fraternities" came in the mid-1980s when there were 36 fraternities on campus, all located on "The Hill". Sororities were notably forced to operate off campus. When the drinking age was increased to 21, fraternities started to run into frequent hazing incidents and disciplinary issues which resulted in many of them being forced by the school to disband in the 1990s. Many of their former houses were transitioned to sorority houses and a few were demolished to make way for more dorms. As of 2024, some of the houses on "The Hill" remain vacant.

In recent years, some former Greek houses have been converted to "Themed Communities" where students with a shared interest can live together. Currently, there are five such houses for upperclassmen.

=== Traditions ===
Lehigh's school colors, brown and white, date back to 1874.

Lehigh University has several traditions, such as the annual Spirit Week leading up to the Lehigh-Lafayette football game.

Another event is their Bed Races, where students form teams, decorate beds, and drag race them down Packer Avenue. Initially bed races were organized by students, originally exclusively fraternity brothers, who constructed their own beds to demonstrate their engineering skills, and racing them down Sayre Park's hill where the fraternity houses are. Starting in 2014 the school mandated and provided uniform beds for safety reasons, and during the COVID-19 pandemic took over the races entirely, making the beds motorized to be raced along the flat Packer Ave.

Orientation Week also features class flag presentations at "The Rally," where each class is represented by an official flag passed down by their adopting class, 50 years their senior. The oldest surviving class flag dates back to 1889.

The Lehigh-Lafayette football rivalry, which began in 1884, is one of the most celebrated in college football, with the two schools having met more times than any other rivalry in the nation.

The Marching 97 band also plays a key role in Le-Laf Week, performing traditional Lehigh fight songs as they parade through campus. The "Eco-flame" tradition, originating in the 1970s when Professor Rich Aaronson invited the band to perform for his ECO 001 class, remains a staple of the week.

Campus-wide events such as Lehigh After Dark's carnival and the GO campaign launch, which featured a Halsey concert, bring students from various class years and interest groups together, further enhancing the community spirit.

=== Student publications ===
==== The Brown and White ====
The school newspaper, The Brown and White, has been continuously published since 1894.

==== The Lehigh Burr ====
From 1881 to 1934 students also maintained a student periodical magazine, The Lehigh Burr initially allowed any student to submit an article for consideration by the editor mostly consisting of news, poetry, and other student works.

=== ROTC ===
Since 1919 Lehigh maintains a unit in the Army Reserve Officers' Training Corps, the Steel Battalion of the 2nd ROTC Brigade, which is headquartered in Jordan Hall on the mountaintop campus.

== Athletics ==
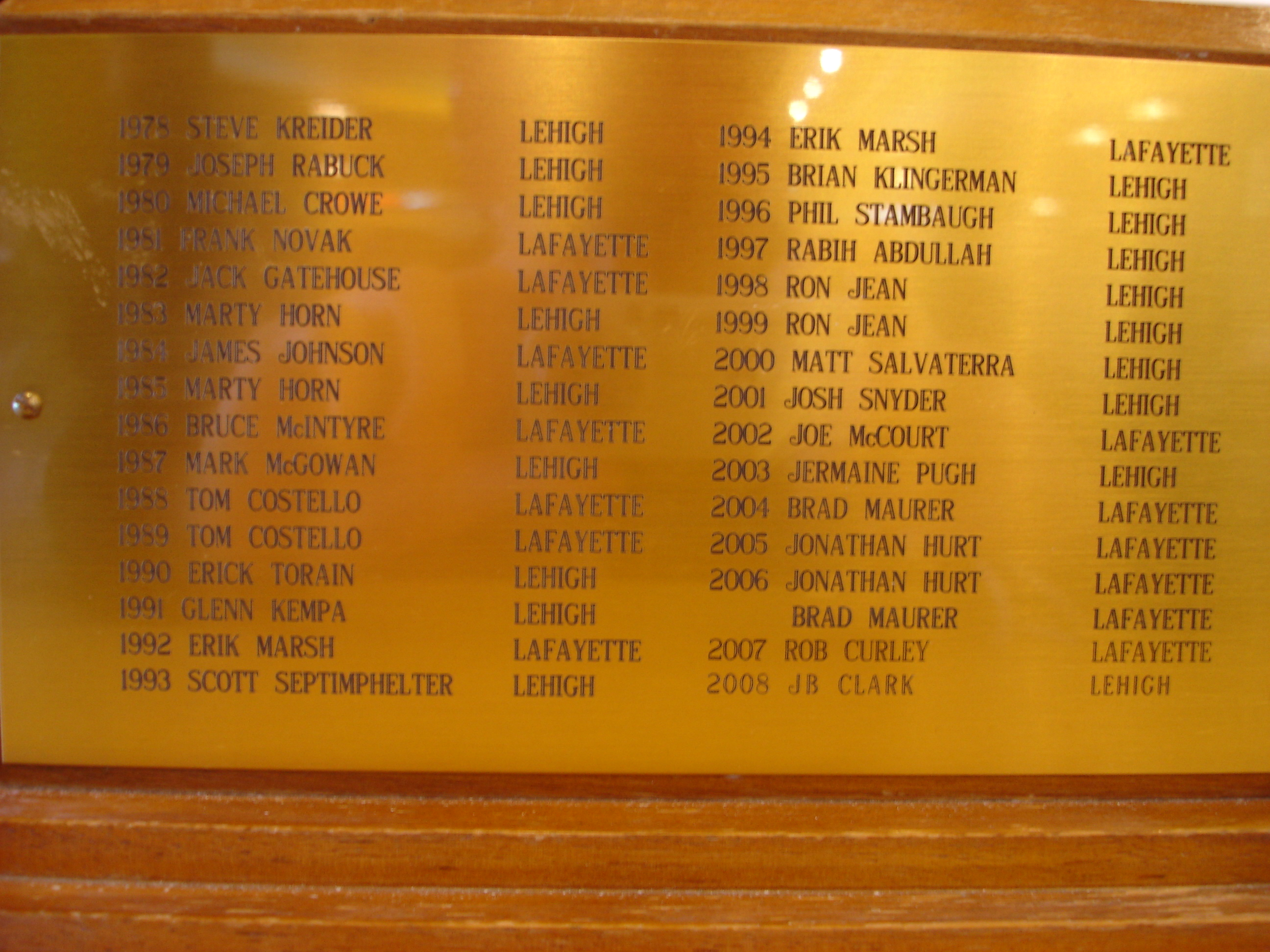
The Lafayette–Lehigh most valuable player trophy plaque prior to the 144th meeting of The Rivalry in 2009; the series between the two colleges, which are 17 miles (27 km) away from each other in the Lehigh Valley, is the most-played rivalry in college football history with 158 meetings since 1884.

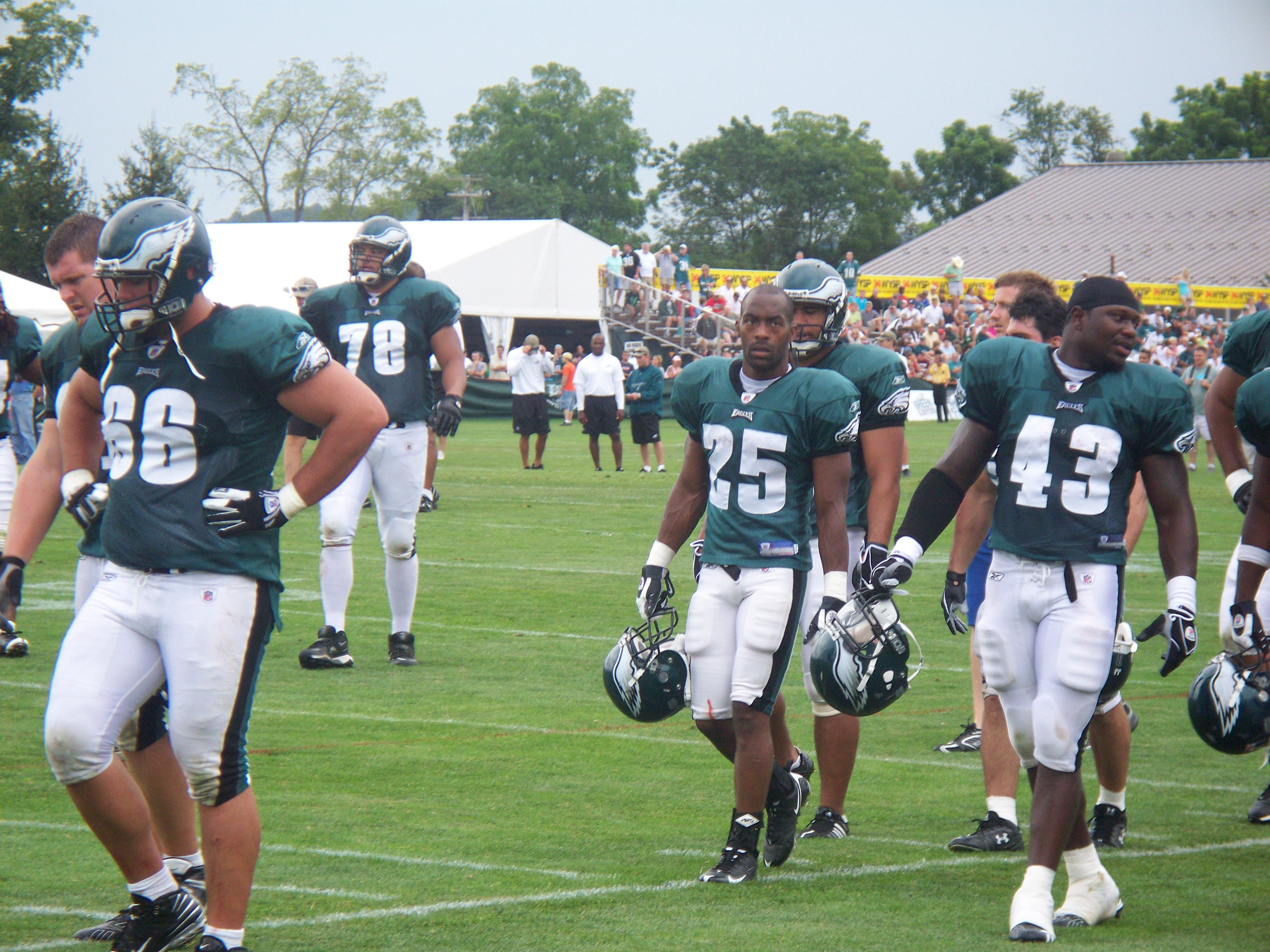
Philadelphia Eagles training camp at Lehigh in August 2009

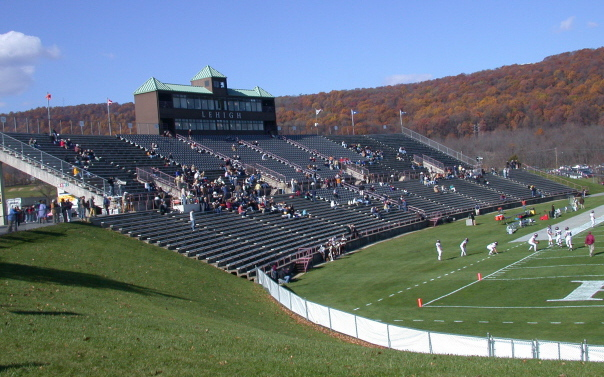
Goodman Stadium at Lehigh in October 2007

As a member of the Patriot League, Lehigh competes in 25 different NCAA Division I sports. Lehigh's 2006 student-athlete graduation rate of 97% ranked 12th among all 326 NCAA Division I institutions. In 2002, it won the inaugural USA Today/NCAA Foundation Award for having the nation's top graduation rate of all Division I institutions.

Lehigh graduates have gone on to professional careers in the National Football League, Major League Baseball, Major League Soccer, and the National Basketball Association as players, scouts, coaches, and owners. Lehigh graduates have competed in the Super Bowl and won gold medals for the U.S. at the Olympic Games. While it is not a school sport, a number of Lehigh alumni, including Roger Penske, Al Holbert, and John Fitch, went on to successful careers in auto racing.

=== Basketball ===
Lehigh's fifth trip to the NCAA tournament in 2012 proved to be their most notable to date, thanks to its first-round game as a #15 seed on March 16, 2012, against the #2 seed Duke Blue Devils. Despite being a heavy underdog, thanks to CJ McCollum's 30-point heroics, the Mountain Hawks pulled off the stunning upset, defeating the Blue Devils 75-70 and making it only the sixth time that a 15th seed had defeated a second seed.

=== Football ===
Lehigh University and nearby Lafayette College are rivals in sports. Since 1884, the two football teams have met over 160 times, making the game between the two programs, known as The Rivalry, the most played in the history of college football.

The rivalry between Lehigh and Lafayette is also the longest uninterrupted rivalry in college football; the teams have played annually since 1897. For the 150th meeting, the teams played before a sold-out Yankee Stadium in New York City.

The week leading up to the game features traditional festivities, including decorating fraternity houses, parties, rallies and the Marching 97 performing unexpectedly during classes the Friday before the game.

=== Wrestling ===
The most storied athletic program at Lehigh is its wrestling team, which began in 1910. Over the past several decades, the Lehigh wrestling team has produced 158 All-Americans and had numerous squads finish with Top 20 NCAA national rankings, including finishing second in the nation in 1939. In 2008, the athletic department hired Pat Santoro, a two-time national champion and two-time winner of the EIWA Coach of the Year (2009, 2012) as Lehigh's head wrestling coach.

Home dual meets and tournaments take place in Leeman-Turner Arena at Grace Hall, on the university's main campus. Commonly known as "The Snake Pit", it has been the home of Lehigh wrestling since 1942. In 2013, Grace Hall was converted into the Caruso Wrestling Complex, including a visiting area and Lehigh's College Wrestling Wall of Fame.

In March 2017, Lehigh wrestler and Bethlehem native Darian Cruz won the NCAA Division I national wrestling tournament, becoming Lehigh's first national champion since Zach Rey, Lehigh's current assistant wrestling coach, won the title in the heavyweight division six years earlier, in 2011.

=== Lacrosse ===
Lehigh University's lacrosse program is a prominent part of Lehigh's athletic offerings, with both men's and women's teams competing at the Division I level. The men's team and women's team compete in the Patriot League.

The men's lacrosse team has achieved historic success over the years, including four Patriot League Championships. The team earned an automatic bid to the NCAA Tournament in 2024 after rallying to defeat Boston University 11–10 in the championship game.

== The Clery Act ==
On April 5, 1986, Jeanne Clery, a 19-year-old Lehigh freshman, was raped and murdered in her Lehigh dorm room; the perpetrator, a Lehigh student, was apprehended, tried, and sentenced to death (later reduced to life in prison without parole). In 1990, the backlash against unreported crimes on numerous campuses across the country led the United States Congress to pass the Jeanne Clery Disclosure of Campus Security Policy and Campus Crime Statistics Act, known as the Clery Act, which requires that colleges reveal information regarding crime on their campuses.

== See also ==
- Lehigh University Press
