= St. Gabriel's Catholic Parish Complex =

Historic church in Pennsylvania, United States

- U.S. National Register of Historic Places
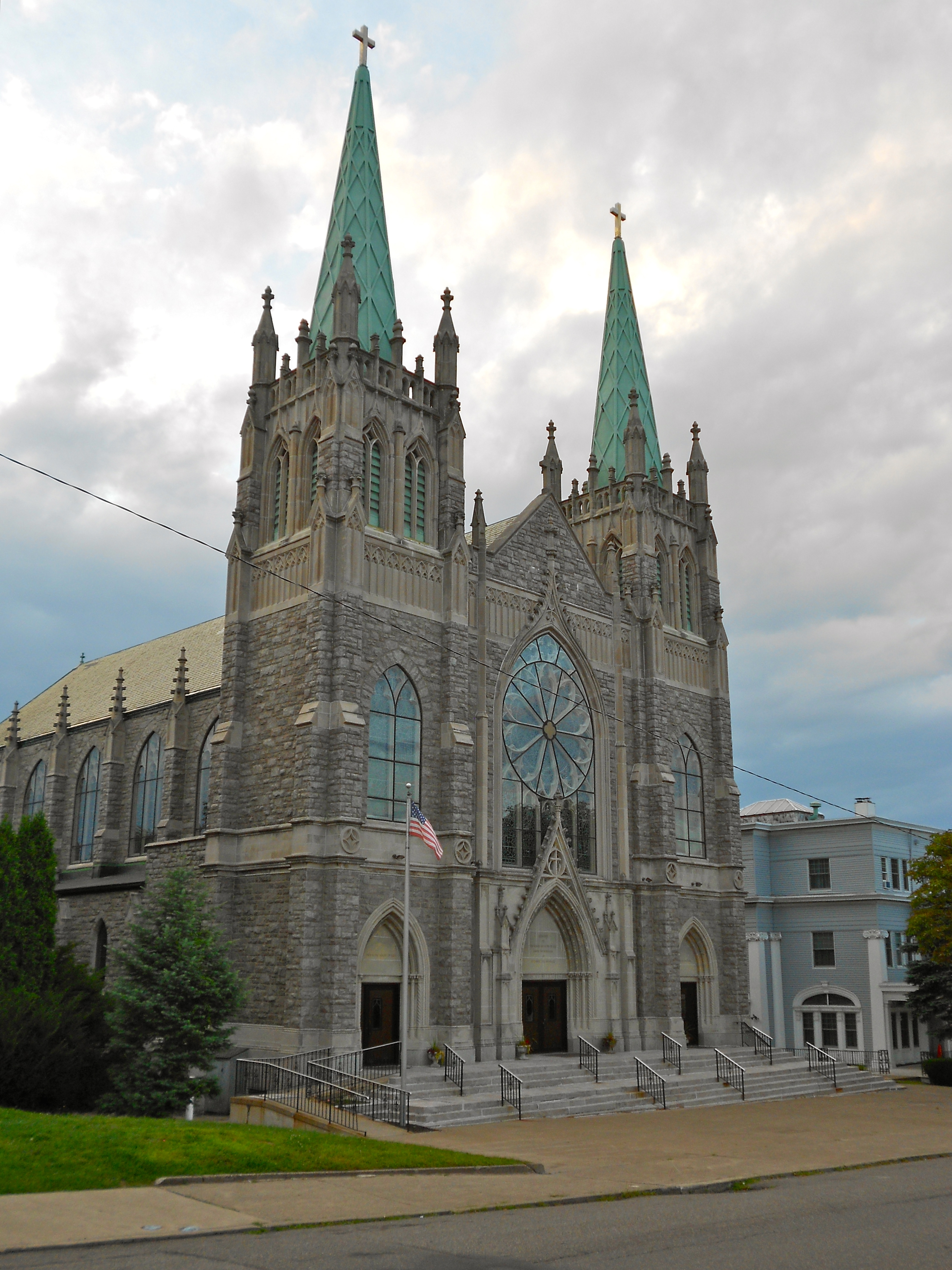
- Church in 2013

- Location within Pennsylvania Location within the United States
- Location: 122-142 S. Wyoming St., Hazleton, Pennsylvania
- Coordinates: 40°56′55″N 75°58′20″W
- Area: 1.3 acres (0.53 ha)
- Built: 1907-1908, 1925, 1937
- Architect: Sheridan, Peter B.; DePace, Anthony J.
- Architectural style: Gothic Revival, Colonial Revival
- NRHP reference No.: 02000889
- Added to NRHP: August 22, 2002

St. Gabriel's Catholic Parish Complex is a historic Roman Catholic church complex located at 122-142 S. Wyoming Street in Hazleton, Luzerne County, Pennsylvania within the Diocese of Scranton.

== Description ==
The St. Gabriel's complex consists of the church (1925), rectory (1907–1908), and former convent (1937). The church is a high French Gothic Revival steel frame building clad in pink granite ashlar with Indiana limestone trim. It features twin bell towers with triple entrance portals at the front facade. The rectory is a three-story, wood-frame building in the Colonial Revival style. The convent was designed by architect Anthony J. DePace (1892–1977), and is a four-story building clad in granite ashlar and limestone. It was converted to affordable apartments and offices in 1998–1999. The church was founded in 1855. It merged with Annunciation Parish.

It was added to the National Register of Historic Places in 2002.

== Gallery ==
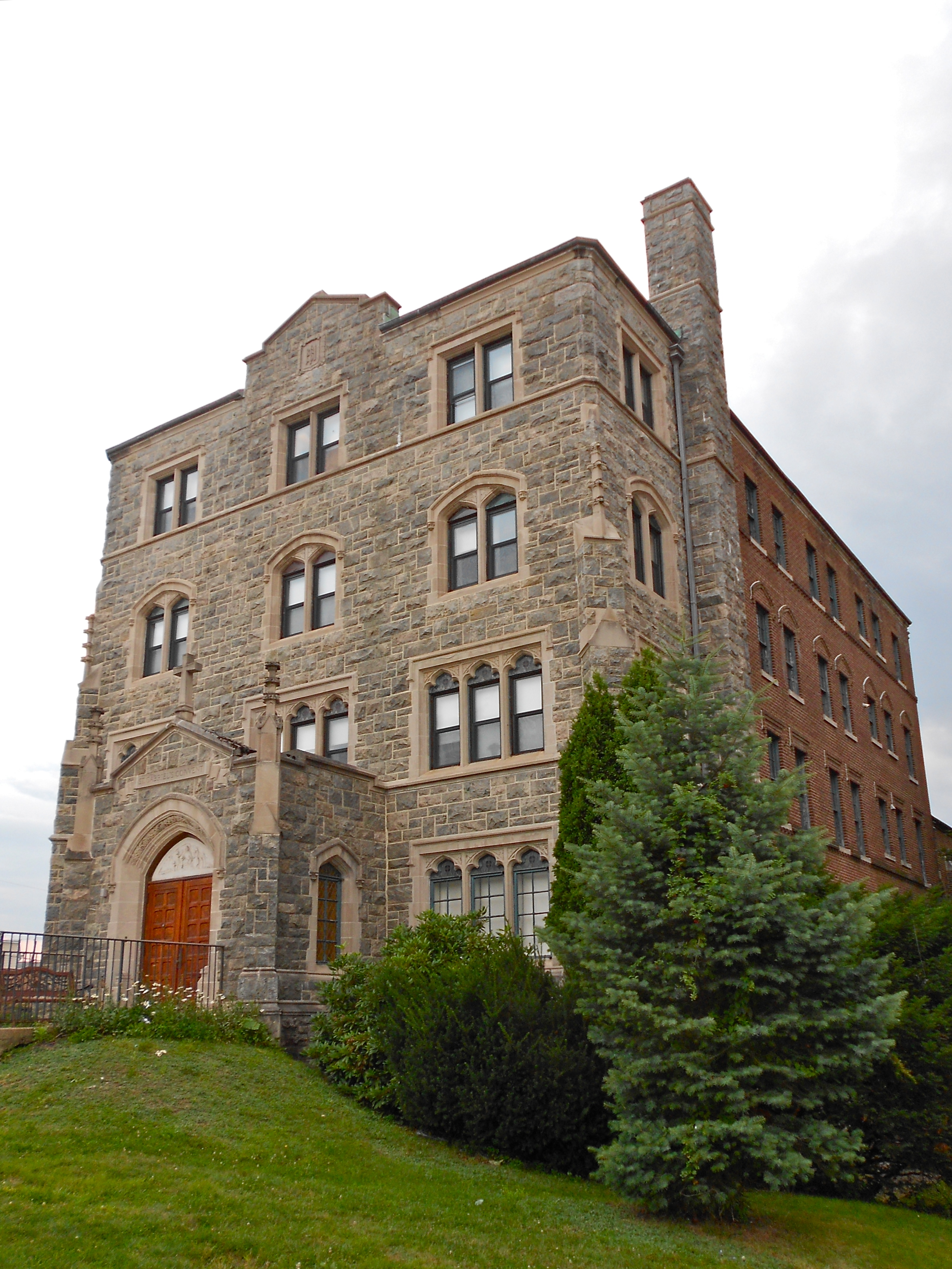
Convent building in 2013

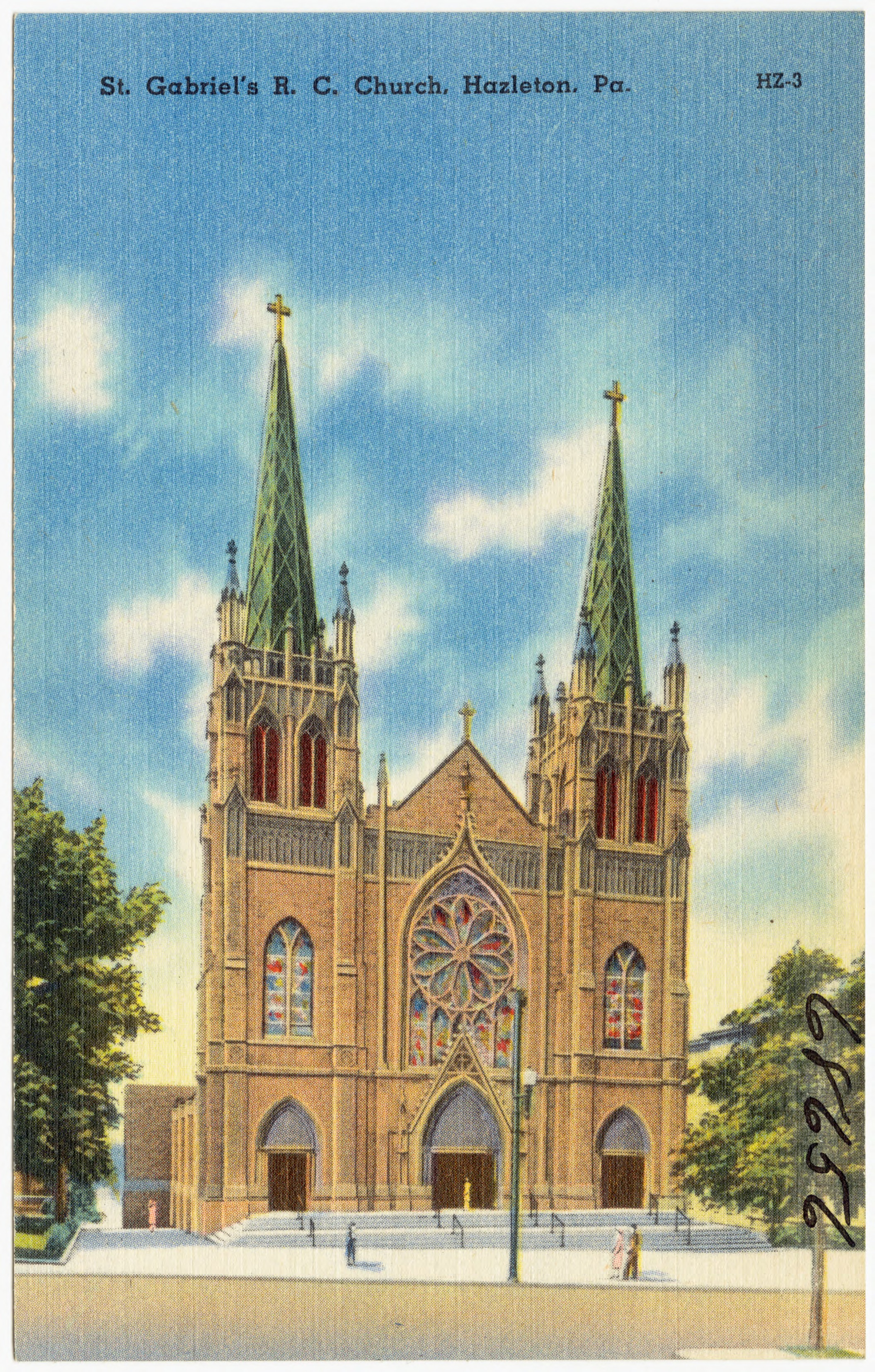
Postcard c. 1940
