= Hazleton, Pennsylvania =

City in Pennsylvania, United States

- City
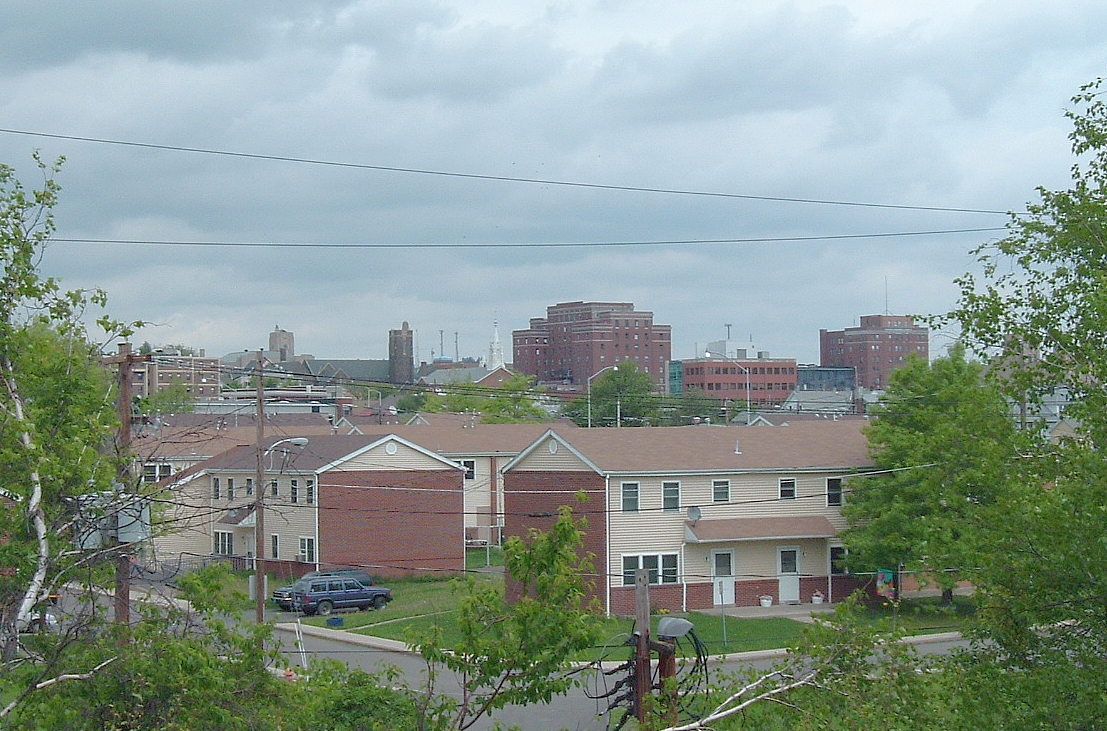
- Downtown Hazleton in 2004

- Seal
- Nicknames: The Mountain City, Mob City, The Power City
- Location of Hazleton in Luzerne County, Pennsylvania

- Location of Luzerne County in Pennsylvania Hazleton, Pennsylvania (the United States)
- Coordinates: 40°57′32″N 75°58′28″W
- Country: United States
- State: Pennsylvania
- County: Luzerne
- Settled: 1780

Government
  - Mayor: Jeff Cusat (R)

Area
  - Total: 5.97 sq mi (15.47 km^{2})
  - Land: 5.97 sq mi (15.47 km^{2})
  - Water: 0 sq mi (0.00 km^{2})
- Elevation: 1,689 ft (515 m)

Population (2020)
  - Total: 29,963
  - Density: 5,017.2/sq mi (1,937.17/km^{2})
- Time zone: UTC−5 (EST)
  - Summer (DST): UTC−4 (EDT)
- ZIP codes: 18201, 18202
- Area codes: 570 and 272
- FIPS code: 42-33408
- Website: www.hazletoncity.org

Hazleton is a city in Luzerne County, Pennsylvania, United States. The population was 29,963 at the 2020 census. Hazleton is the second-most populous city in Luzerne County. It was incorporated as a borough on January 5, 1857, and as a city on December 4, 1891.

Hazleton is located in Northeastern Pennsylvania, 35 miles (56 km) northwest of Allentown, 82 miles (132 km) north-northwest of Philadelphia and 106 miles (171 km) west of New York City.

== History ==
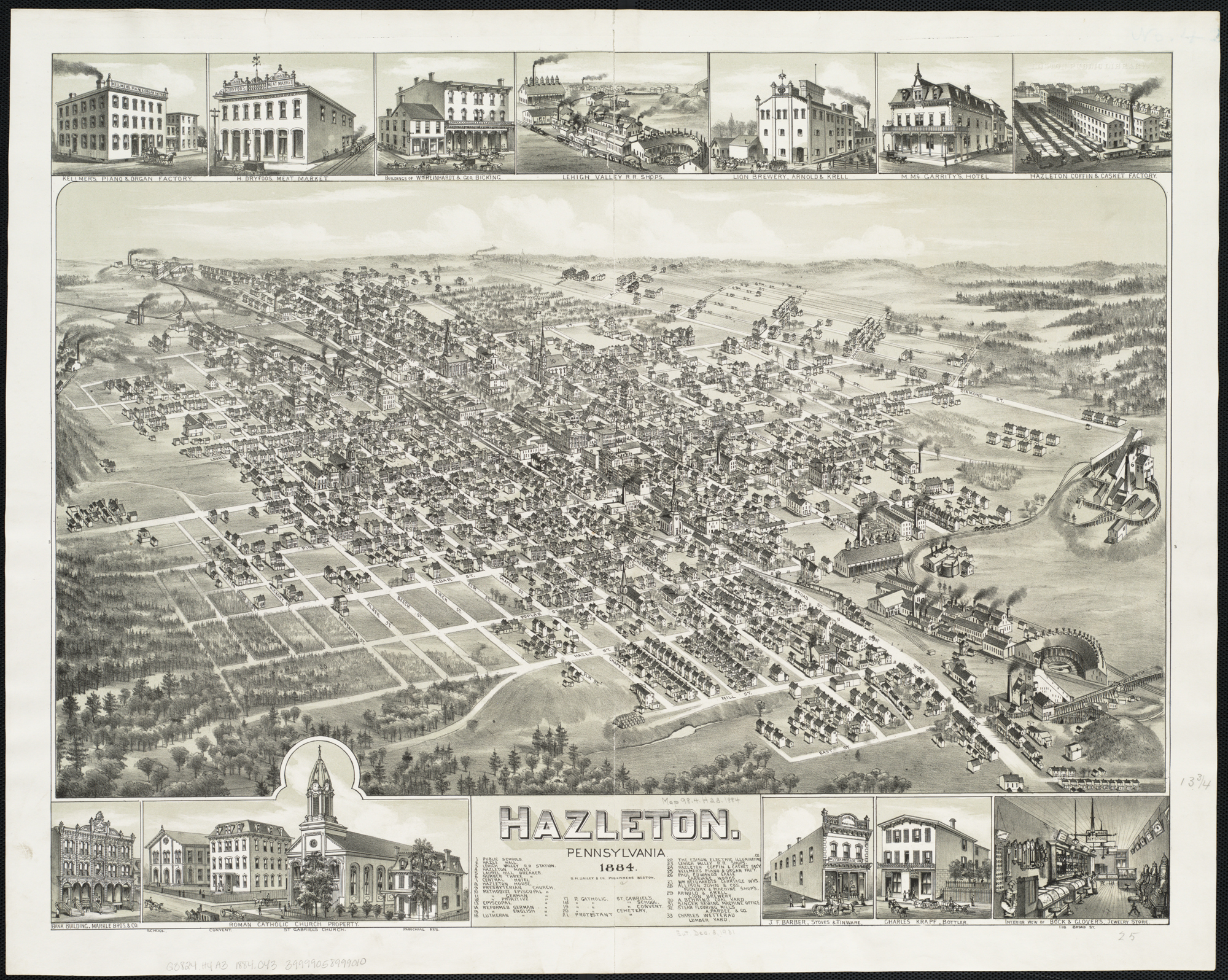
An 1884 illustration of Hazleton

During the early years of European colonization in the Americas, the area which today makes up the city of Hazleton sat at the intersection of two Native American trails.

The Nanticoke path was used by the Nanticoke people during their migration to and settlement of the Wyoming Valley, east of Wilkes-Barre.

The Nescopeck path ran from the forks of the Delaware River, to the Nescopeck Creek. It was used by traders and missionaries, Delaware war parties, and settlers.

=== Sugarloaf massacre ===
During the height of the American Revolution, in the summer of 1780, British sympathizers (known as Tories) began attacking the outposts of American revolutionaries located along the Susquehanna River in the Wyoming Valley. Because of reports of Tory activity in the region, Captain Daniel Klader and a platoon of 41 men from Northampton County were sent to investigate. They traveled north from the Lehigh Valley along a path known as "Warrior's Trail" (which is present-day Pennsylvania Route 93). This route connects the Lehigh River in Jim Thorpe (formerly known as Mauch Chunk) to the Susquehanna River in Berwick.

Captain Klader's men made it as far north as present-day Conyngham, when they were ambushed by Tory militiamen and members of the Seneca tribe. In all, 15 men were killed on September 11, 1780, in what is now known as the Sugarloaf massacre.

The Moravians, a Christian denomination, had been using "Warrior's Trail" since the early 18th century after the Moravian missionary Nicolaus Ludwig Zinzendorf first used it to reach the Wyoming Valley. This particular stretch of "Warrior's Trail" had an abundance of hazel trees. Though the Moravians called the region "St. Anthony's Wilderness", it eventually became known as "Hazle Swamp", a name which had been used previously by the Native Americans. The Moravian missionaries were sent from their settlements in Bethlehem to the site of the Sugarloaf Massacre to bury the dead soldiers. Some Moravians decided to stay, and in 1782, they built a settlement (St. Johns) along the Nescopeck Creek, which is near the present-day intersection of Interstates 80 and 81.

=== Jacob Drumheller ===
In the late 18th and early 19th centuries, the Warrior's Trail was revamped and widened. It was renamed the Lausanne-Nescopeck Turnpike. Later, a road was built to connect Wilkes-Barre to McKeansburg. This road intersected with the Berwick Turnpike. An entrepreneur named Jacob Drumheller decided that this intersection was the perfect location for a rest stop, so in 1809, he built the first building in what would later be known as Hazleton. Though a few buildings and houses were erected nearby, the area remained a dense wilderness for nearly 20 years. At the time, the area offered little more than small-scale logging. Jacob Drumheller is buried at Conyngham Union Cemetery.

=== Discovery of coal ===
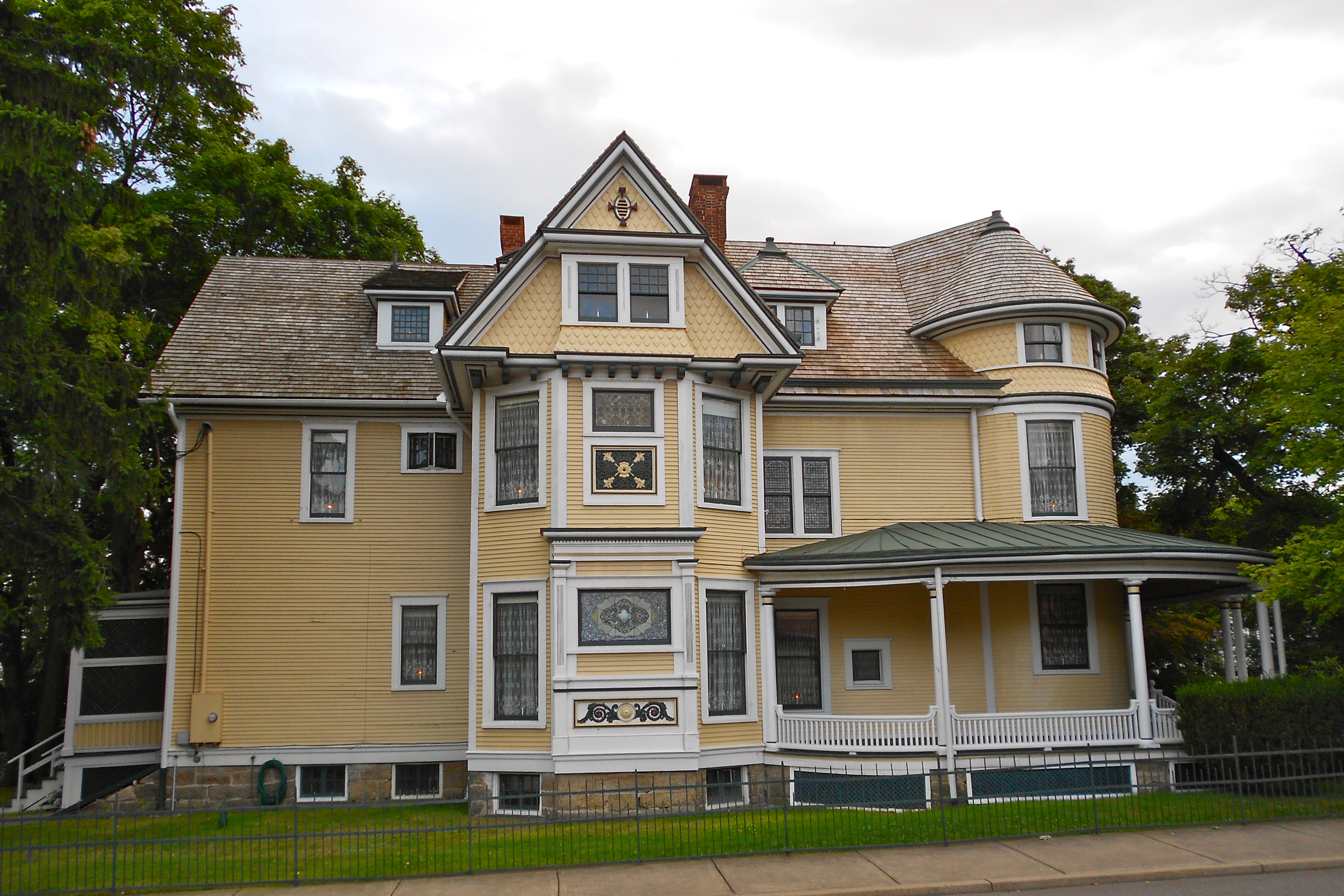
Israel Platt Pardee Mansion in Hazleton

In 1818, anthracite coal deposits were discovered in nearby Beaver Meadows by prospectors Nathaniel Beach and Tench Coxe. This caught the attention of railroad developers in Philadelphia. A young engineer from New York named Ariovistus "Ario" Pardee was hired to survey the topography of Beaver Meadows and report the practicality of extending a railroad from the Lehigh Canal in Jim Thorpe to Beaver Meadows. Knowing that the area of Beaver Meadows was already controlled by Coxe and Beach, Pardee bought many acres of the land in present-day Hazleton. The investment proved to be lucrative. The land contained part of a massive anthracite coal field. Pardee is known as the founding father of Hazleton because of these contributions and initially laying out the patch town that eventually became Hazleton.

Pardee incorporated the Hazleton Coal Company in 1836, the same year the rail link to the Lehigh Valley market was on the brink of being completed. Hazleton Coal Company built the first school on Church Street, where Hazleton City Hall is now located. Pardee also built the first church in Hazleton, located at the intersection of Church and Broad Streets, and the first private school in Hazleton, located on the south side of Broad Street between Wyoming and Laurel Streets. Pardee died in 1892. The following year, in 1893, his son, Israel Platt Pardee, built a three-story, 19-room mansion in Hazleton; it was added to the National Register of Historic Places in 1984.

The anthracite coal industry attracted many immigrants for labor. The first wave, in the 1840s and 1850s, consisted mostly of German and Irish immigrants. The second wave, from the 1860s to the 1920s, consisted mostly of Italian, Polish, Russian, Lithuanian, Slovak, and Montenegrin immigrants. The coal mined in Hazleton helped establish the United States as a world industrial power, including fueling the massive blast furnaces at Bethlehem Steel.

=== Incorporation ===
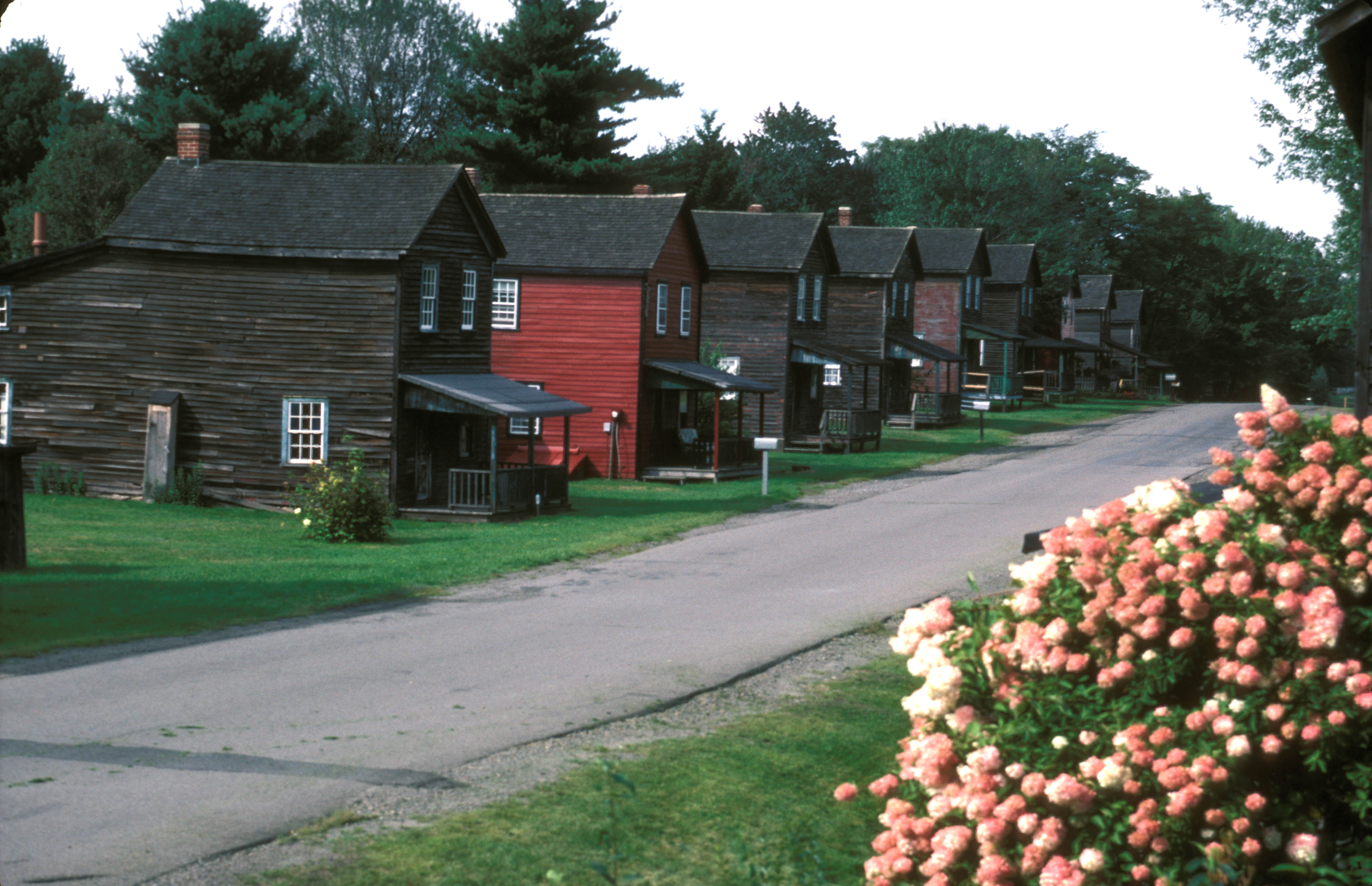
Eckley Miners' Village

Hazleton was incorporated as a borough on January 5, 1857. A persistent story purporting that the borough's name was intended to be "Hazelton" but was misspelled by a clerk during its incorporation is most likely an urban legend. The name was spelled with "le" rather than "el" in the earliest references to the Hazleton Coal Co. (1836) and to the town itself. Perhaps the earliest map showing Hazleton (with the "le" spelling) was published in 1843 by Sydney E. Morse & Co. The borough's first fire company, the Pioneer Fire Company, was organized in 1867 by soldiers returning home from the American Civil War.

Many small company towns, often referred to by locals as "patch towns" or "patches", surrounded Hazleton. They were built by coal companies to provide housing for the miners and their families. The following is a list of "patch towns" constructed in and around Hazleton:

- Beaver Meadows, coal was discovered here
- Stockton, founded by John Stockton
- Jeansville, founded by James Milens
- Milnesville, founded by James Milens
- Tresckow, formerly known as Dutchtown
- Junedale, formerly known as Colraine
- Freeland, originally called Freehold (founded by Joseph Birkbeck in 1846)
- McAdoo, originally called Pleasant Hill, then Saylors Hill
- West Hazleton, founded by Conrad Horn
- Eckley, founded by Eckley B. Coxe
- Jeddo, named after a Japanese port to which coal was exported by the Hazleton Coal Company
- Hollywood, part of Hazleton, named before Hollywood, California
- Weatherly, a small borough outside of Hazleton
- Humboldt Village, a tiny village outside of Hazleton

=== Prosperity and tragedy ===
A picture taken before the September 1897 Lattimer massacre

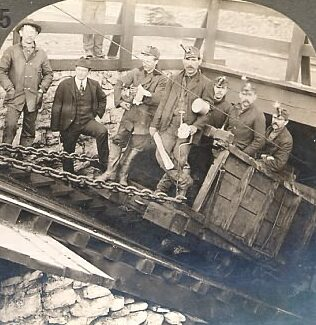
Coal miners near Hazleton

As industry and commerce developed, so did the footprint of organized labor. Nineteenth century attempts by the United Mine Workers of America (UMWA) to organize in the anthracite region were largely unsuccessful.

On September 10, 1897, after several weeks of escalating walkouts and strikes at surrounding mines, the Lattimer Massacre occurred when 300-400 strikers near Hazleton marched to the Lattimer Mine to support a newly formed UMW local. Nineteen unarmed striking miners, mostly of Polish, Slovak, Lithuanian, and German ethnicity, were shot and killed in a confrontation with the Luzerne County sheriff's posse. Scores more were wounded. The massacre was a turning point in the history of the UMW, with over 10,000 new members signing cards in its aftermath. However, the UMW would not be able to capitalize on this momentum and obtain union recognition in the Leigh Valley until the 20th century.

Hazleton was also struck by several mining disasters. Notable among these were the cave-ins at Sheppton, Jeanesville, and Stockton.

Mining disasters were not the only tragedies. In October 1888, a train crash killed 66 people near Mud Run when one passenger train crashed into the rear of another train on their way to White Haven. It was one of the worst train wrecks recorded in United States history.

In 1891, Hazleton became the third city in the United States to establish a citywide electric grid. Hazleton was incorporated as a city on December 4, 1891. At the time, the population was estimated to be around 14,000 people.

In the second half of the 19th century, middle class professionals whose industries serviced the mining economy led an effort to diversify the economy in Hazleton and attract large scale manufacturing employers, who could hire from the area's large pool of unemployed women. The local improvement associations who led this initiative were successful in attracting a number of firms, including several mills and a brewery. The Duplan Silk Corporation opened in Hazleton in 1899, with financial support from local banks, the Lehigh Valley Railroad, and $10,000 from a fundraising drive.

=== 20th and 21st centuries ===
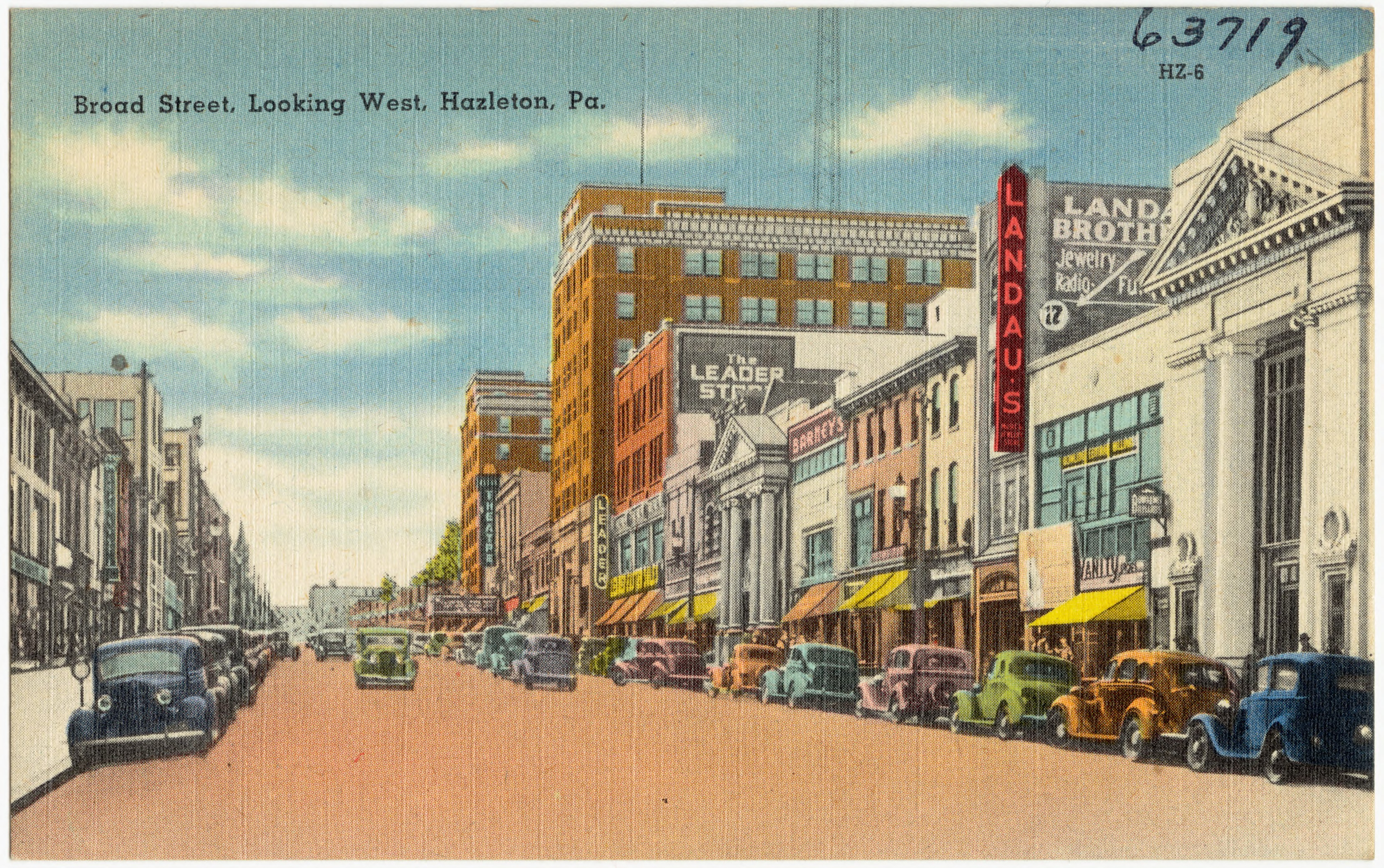
An early 20th century postcard of Hazleton

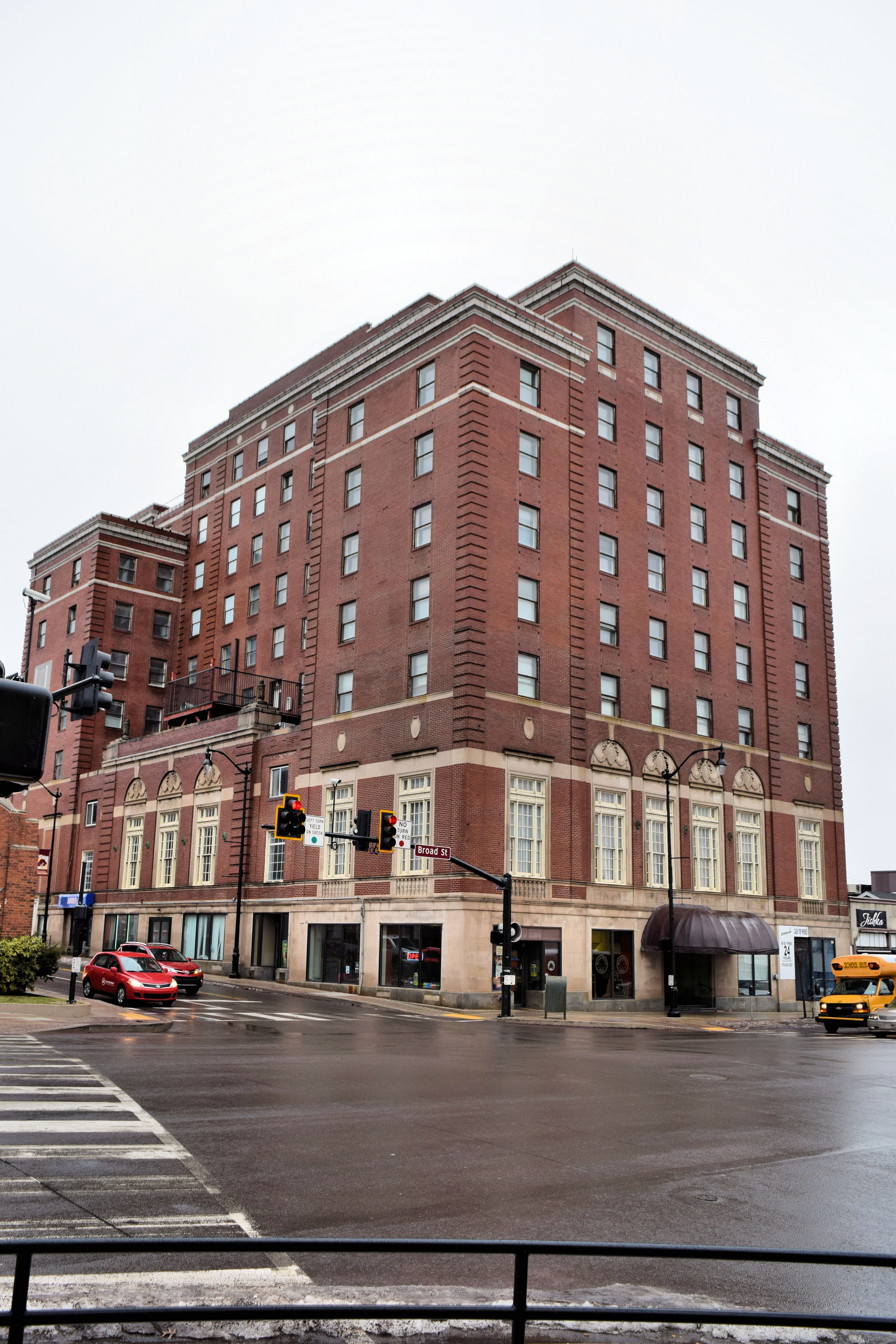
Altamont Hotel in Hazleton

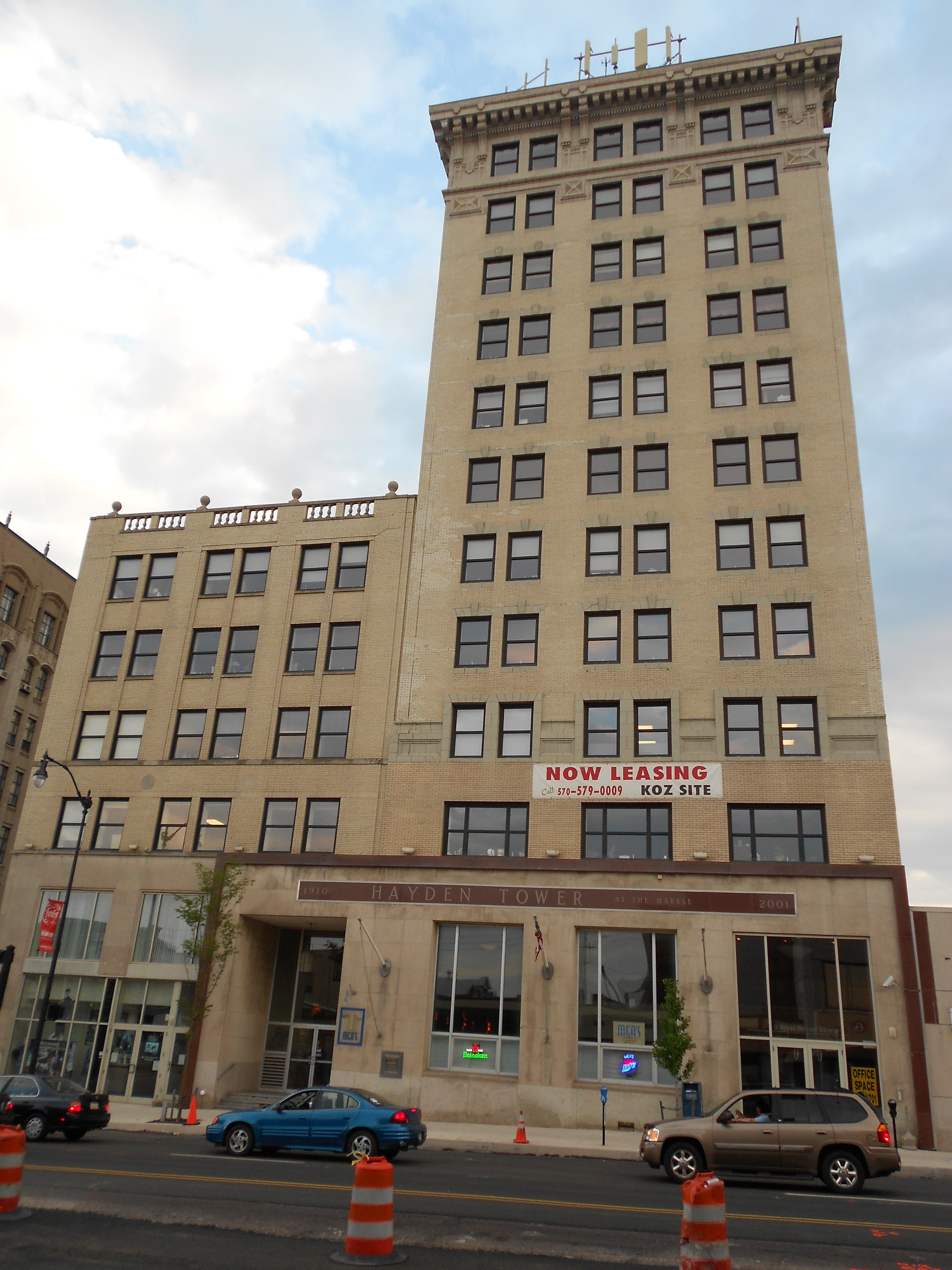
Markle Banking & Trust Company Building in Hazleton

Leading into the 20th century, Hazleton's population drastically changed. The "boom period" in population was 1885 to 1920. In 1860, there were only about one thousand people in Hazleton, but by 1880, there were nearly seven thousand people, which quickly became thirty-two thousand by 1920. After the 1900 and 1902 anthracite coal strikes, mine workers won some improvements to their working conditions, which they were able to build upon in ensuing contracts. The diversification of the city's economy stabilized the population by allowing miners to establish families in the area, with women and children often working in silk or shirt manufacturing for supplemental wages.

The Duplan Silk Mill was expanded in 1908 and became one of the largest and most productive silk mills in the country, employing between 1,800 and 2,000 area residents and with an annual payroll of $5 million. The mill produced about 25 million yards of cloth per year. In 1913, 1,200 silk workers, mostly young women, went on strike at the Duplan silk mill and voted to join the Industrial Workers of the World. The strike was overshadowed by the contemporaneous Patterson Silk Strike, and failed to achieve momentum.

The first Hazleton Public Library opened in 1907. In 1912, a new library opened on Church and Green streets. This building was donated by independent coal operator John Markle and is still in use today as the Hazleton Area Public Library's children's department.

Coal production began to decline in the late 1920s, but the mining industry still employed nearly 20,000 men at that time. In 1926, 900 miners at the Jeddo-Highland Coal Company initiated a wildcat strike over a pay dispute. They were ordered back to work by the District 7 president of the UMWA, who insisted that they negotiate the dispute through the Anthracite Board of Conciliation as outlined in their contract.

The population peaked in 1940 at 38,000. With increased population came increased business, from downtown storefronts to large campuses like Penn State Hazleton.

In 1941, UMWA President John L. Lewis revoked the charter of the UMWA's District 7 local in response to a 27-day work stoppage by 20,000 miners in protest of dues increases and other union policies. The local was administered by a provisional government for some time and had its constitution suspended.

One of the 14 games between I.A. Horowitz and Samuel Reshevsky during the 1941 US Chess Championship was held in Hazleton. The result was a draw. The remaining games were held in Brooklyn, Philadelphia, Lakewood, New Jersey and Binghamton, New York.

In 1946, local milk producers initiated a capital strike, closing facilities and halting the delivery of milk to 100,000 residents in the region in protest of Office of Price Administration policy.

Before World War II, anthracite coal flourished as a major provider of fuel for the nation. After the war, the demand for coal began to decline as natural gas and electricity became preferred power sources; coal became a less needed commodity. Deep mining, the predominant method of coal extraction in the region, also proved costly and vulnerable to flooding. In 1947, 22 consecutive days of rain flooded many Hazleton area mines and reduced year-to-date anthracite production by up to 35% below normal levels.

Hurricanes Hazel and Diane, in 1954 and 1955, also devastated the local mining industry. They flooded the mines and brought an end to Hazleton's deep mining. Unemployment soared, reaching 25-30%. The population began to emigrate at a rate of 1,000 per year. While most of the region's deep mines never reopened, strip mining would continue as long as it was economically advantageous. A new era was about to be born: the era of business and industry.

The garment industry thrived and was invested in by New York mobster Albert Anastasia.

In 1947, Autolite Corporation was looking to expand operations in the East and had been looking into Hazleton. Officials from Autolite came to the area and surveyed the land. In their report, they noted that Hazleton was a "mountain wilderness" with no major water route, rail route, trucking route, or airport.

Local leaders sought to address these deficiencies by soliciting donations from the public to subsidize the establishment of the $3,500,000 Autolite plant. They promised the Autolite Corporation $500,000 and were able to raise $659,000. The initiative was supported by local businessmen, service clubs, and the UMWA. The Hazleton Industrial Development Corporation also took out loans totaling $700,000 to fund the construction of the plant.

In 1959, a fire at the Gary Hotel killed six people. The hotel, built in 1884, burned down costing around $200,000 in damages.

Public investment in attracting businesses and diversifying the economy continued throughout the 20th century. CAN DO (Community Area New Development Organization) was formally organized in 1956 by founder Dr. Edgar L. Dessen. CAN DO raised money through their "Dime A Week" campaign, in which area residents were encouraged to put a dime on their sidewalk each week to be collected by CAN DO. They also solicited donations from businesses and utilities and sold municipal bonds. The company raised over $250,000 and was able to purchase over 500 acres (2.0 km^{2}) of land, which was converted into an industrial park on the western edge of the city.

Because of CAN-DO's efforts, Hazleton was given the All-America City Award in 1964. Hazleton's economy is now based largely on manufacturing and shipping, facilitated by the relative closeness to Interstates 80 and 81. Five Pennsylvania highways also pass through the Hazleton area: Pennsylvania Route 309, Pennsylvania Route 93, Pennsylvania Route 924, Pennsylvania Route 424, and Pennsylvania Route 940.

The Hazleton Area Public Library opened a new building at Church and Maple Streets in 1969, where it remains to this day.

In 1997, the IWW returned to the Hazleton area in an effort to organize student workers at the Keystone Job Corps Center, but they found little success.

An article published in December 2002 by U.S. News & World Report, "Letter from Pennsylvania: A town in need of a tomorrow", reported on Hazleton's shortcomings. It was criticized by local politicians and business leaders.

On September 11, 2004, the Hazleton campaign hall of the Socialist Workers Party was firebombed, damaging the front of the building and burning campaign literature. The building's books were destroyed by smoke damage. A rally held in response to the attack was attended by the Pennsylvania Governor's Advisory Commission on Latino Affairs as well as local religious leaders and the Spanish-language media. An executive from the IBEW local 1319 in Wilkes-Barre visited the hall and made a contribution to the rebuilding effort.

=== Second immigration wave ===
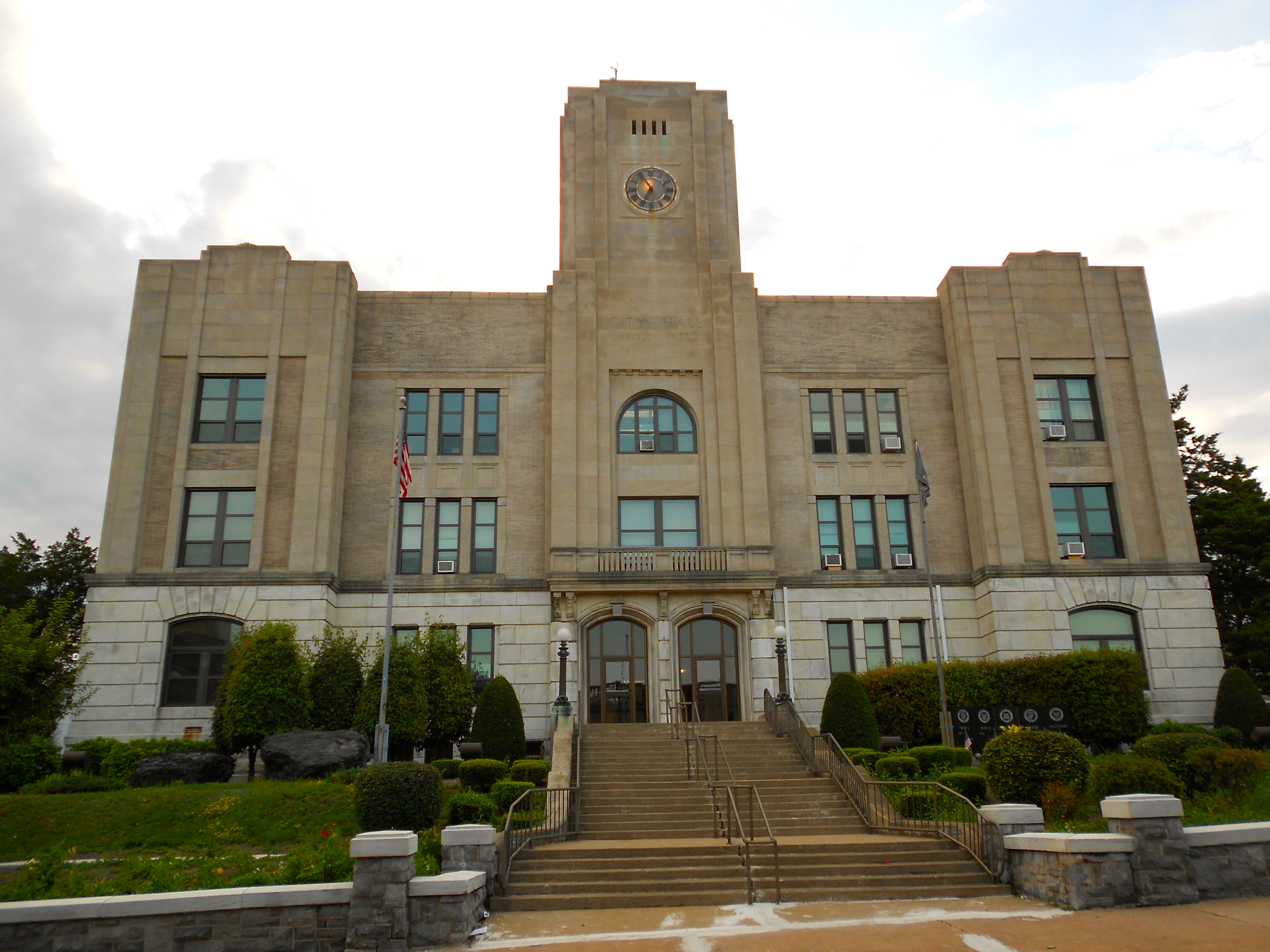
Hazleton City Hall

The city experienced a demographic shift in the first years of the 21st century with the arrival of new immigrants; mostly from the Dominican Republic.

The demographic shift was not well received by all residents. In 2004, a wave of attacks against apartments where immigrant workers were living was condemned by the Pennsylvania Governor's Advisory Commission on Latino Affairs.

In 2006, Hazleton gained national attention as Republican Mayor Lou Barletta and council members passed the Illegal Immigration Relief Act. This ordinance was instituted to discourage hiring or renting to illegal immigrants. Initially, the ordinance levied an administrative fine of $100.00 per illegal immigrant rented to and a loss of permits for non-compliance. Another act passed concurrently made English the official language of Hazleton.

Mayor Barletta estimated that "as many as half" of the estimated 10,000 Hispanics who were living in Hazleton left the city when the ordinance was passed. The issue was covered by the television program 60 Minutes in 2006 and the Fox News show The O'Reilly Factor in March 2007.

The ordinance was criticized as illegal and unconstitutional. A number of residents (landlords, business owners, lawful aliens defined as illegal under the act, and unlawful aliens) filed suit to strike down the law, claiming it violates the Supremacy Clause of the U.S. Constitution as well as the First and Fourteenth Amendments to the Constitution. After a trial and several appeals (including a remand from the Supreme Court), the Third Circuit found the ordinance invalid due to federal preemption.

As of 2015, nearly 40 percent of Hazleton's population was of Hispanic or Latino descent. In 2012, Amilcar Arroyo, a Hazleton Integration Project board member, estimated that 80% of Hazleton's Hispanics and Latinos were of Dominican origin, and that many of them had ancestry from San José de Ocoa. Hazleton has the highest percentage of Dominicans in Pennsylvania and the fourth highest in the nation. Many Dominicans had moved to Hazleton from portions of New York City, including The Bronx and Brooklyn) and parts of North Jersey, such as Newark and Paterson. Many of these migrants had families that were relatively large.

Many Hispanic and Latino businesses are on Wyoming Street, the linguistic landscape of which Spier and Ruano (2021) investigated in light of Barletta's aforementioned comments. In 2016, The Philadelphia Inquirer reported that the Wyoming Street corridor was revived from a moribund state. Also, in 2016, the Hispanic and Latino population became the majority, at 52%, with White residents, many descended from Irish, Italian, and German immigrants, comprising 44% of the population.

== Geography ==
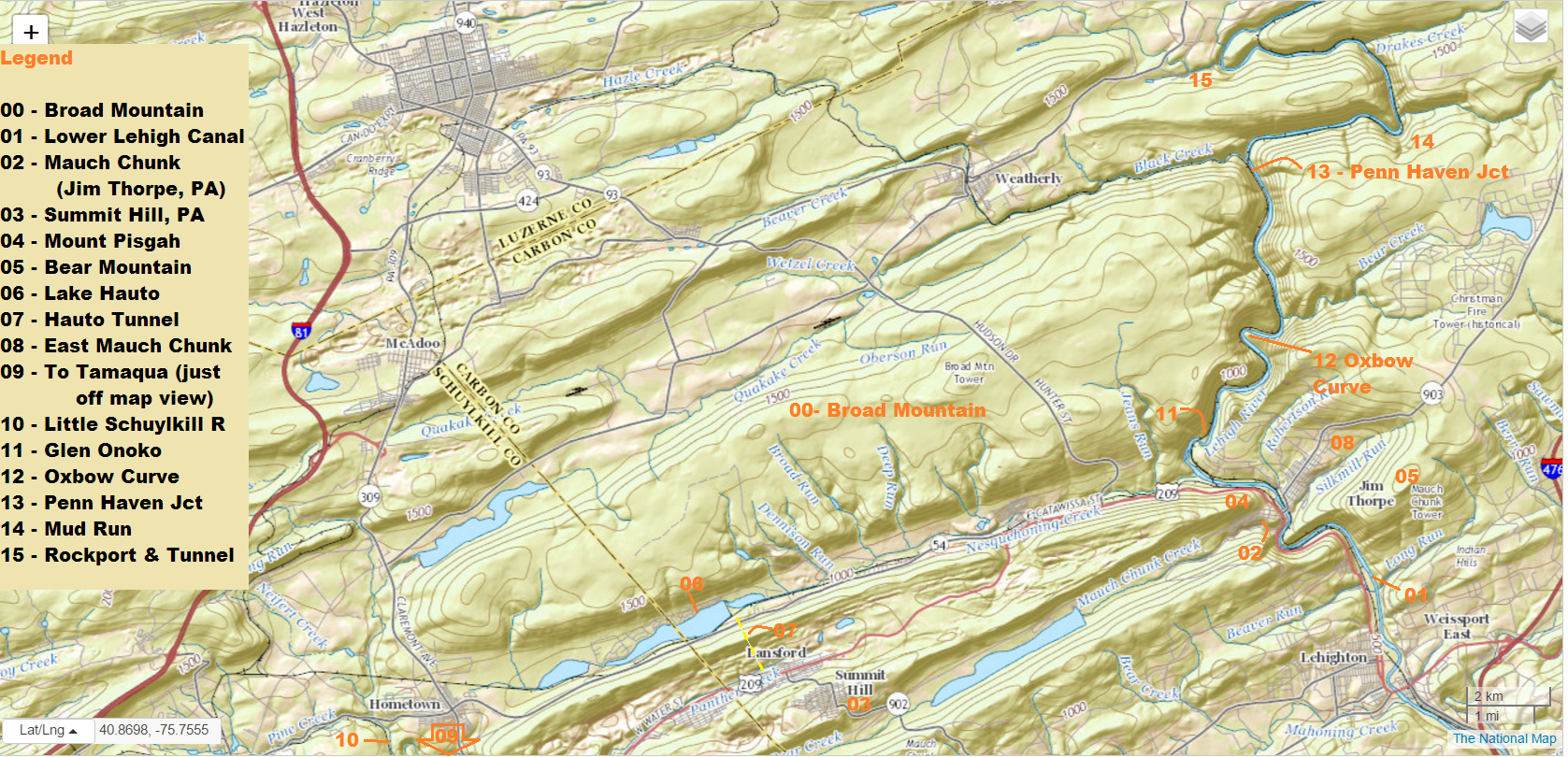
A topographic map showing the terrain in and around Hazleton

Hazleton is located at 40°57′32″N 75°58′28″W (40.958834, −75.974546). According to the U.S. Census Bureau, the city has a total area of 6.0 square miles (16 km^{2}), all land. Hazleton is located 12 miles (19 km) north of Tamaqua and 30 miles (48 km) south of Scranton/Wilkes-Barre. The city is located in Pennsylvania's ridge and valley section (on a plateau named Spring Mountain). Hazleton's highest elevation is 1,886 feet (575 m) above sea level, making it one of the highest incorporated cities east of the Mississippi River and the highest incorporated city in Pennsylvania. It straddles the divide between the Delaware and Susquehanna River watersheds.

=== Greater Hazleton ===
Hazleton and its surrounding communities are collectively known as Greater Hazleton. Greater Hazleton encompasses an area located within three counties: southern Luzerne County, northern Schuylkill County, and northern Carbon County. The population of Greater Hazleton was 77,187 at the 2010 census. Greater Hazleton includes the City of Hazleton; the boroughs of Beaver Meadows, Conyngham, Freeland, Jeddo, McAdoo, Weatherly, West Hazleton, White Haven; the townships of Black Creek, Butler, East Union, Kline, Foster, Hazle, Rush, Sugarloaf; and the towns, villages, or CDPs of Audenried, Coxes Villages, Drifton, Drums, Ebervale, Eckley, Fern Glen, Haddock, Harleigh, Harwood Mines, Hazle Brook, Highland, Hollywood, Hometown, Hudsondale, Humboldt Village, Humboldt Industrial Park, Japan, Jeansville, Junedale, Kelayres, Kis-Lyn, Lattimer, Milnesville, Nuremberg, Oneida, Pardeesville, Quakake, St. Johns, Sandy Run, Still Creek, Stockton, Sybertsville, Ringtown, Sheppton, Tomhicken, Tresckow, Upper Lehigh, Weston, and Zion Grove.

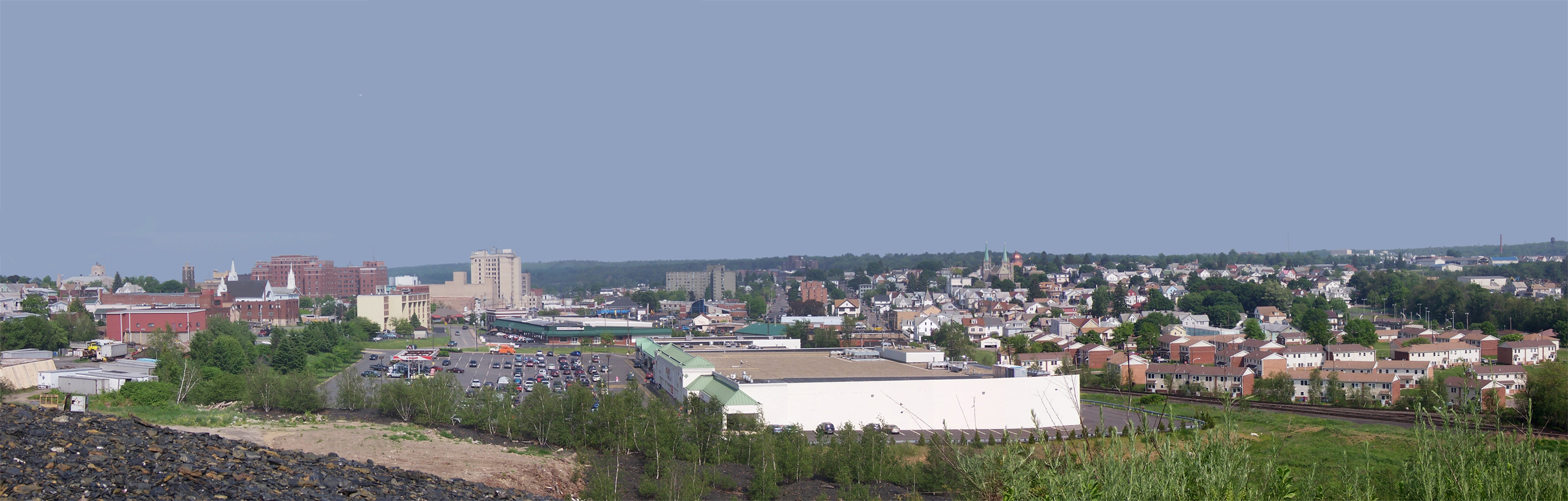
Panoramic view of Hazleton overlooking Downtown and the southern section of the city

== Climate ==
According to the Köppen climate classification system, Hazleton has a warm-summer humid continental climate (Dfb). The average annual snowfall total is 47 inches (1,200 mm). Hazleton averages 50 inches (1,300 mm) of rain annually. The hardiness zone is 6b.

Climate data for Hazleton, Luzerne County, PA
Month	Jan	Feb	Mar	Apr	May	Jun	Jul	Aug	Sep	Oct	Nov	Dec	Year
Mean daily maximum °F (°C)	31.9 (−0.1)	35.4 (1.9)	44.1 (6.7)	57.4 (14.1)	68.1 (20.1)	75.8 (24.3)	79.7 (26.5)	77.5 (25.3)	70.8 (21.6)	59.7 (15.4)	47.8 (8.8)	36.3 (2.4)	57.1 (13.9)
Daily mean °F (°C)	23.8 (−4.6)	26.9 (−2.8)	34.4 (1.3)	46.7 (8.2)	57.3 (14.1)	65.6 (18.7)	70.0 (21.1)	68.1 (20.1)	61.1 (16.2)	49.8 (9.9)	39.5 (4.2)	28.5 (−1.9)	47.7 (8.7)
Mean daily minimum °F (°C)	15.7 (−9.1)	18.3 (−7.6)	24.7 (−4.1)	36.0 (2.2)	46.6 (8.1)	55.4 (13.0)	60.4 (15.8)	58.6 (14.8)	51.4 (10.8)	39.9 (4.4)	31.3 (−0.4)	20.7 (−6.3)	38.3 (3.5)
Average precipitation inches (mm)	3.20 (81)	2.90 (74)	3.55 (90)	4.43 (113)	4.47 (114)	5.19 (132)	4.43 (113)	4.34 (110)	4.78 (121)	4.49 (114)	4.24 (108)	3.71 (94)	49.73 (1,263)
Average relative humidity (%)	74.6	69.0	64.9	61.1	64.7	73.2	73.7	77.0	77.7	74.2	73.4	75.7	71.6
Source: PRISM Climate Group

Month	Jan	Feb	Mar	Apr	May	Jun	Jul	Aug	Sep	Oct	Nov	Dec	Year
Average Dew Point °F	16.9	18.1	23.8	34.0	45.5	56.8	61.2	60.6	54.1	41.9	31.7	21.8	39.0
Average Dew Point °C	-8.4	-7.7	-4.6	1.1	7.5	13.8	16.2	15.9	12.3	5.5	-0.2	-5.7	3.9
Source: PRISM Climate Group

== Demographics ==
Historical population
Census	Pop.	Note	%±
1850	2,080		—
1860	1,707		−17.9%
1870	4,317		152.9%
1880	6,935		60.6%
1890	11,872		71.2%
1900	14,230		19.9%
1910	25,452		78.9%
1920	32,277		26.8%
1930	36,765		13.9%
1940	38,009		3.4%
1950	35,491		−6.6%
1960	32,056		−9.7%
1970	30,426		−5.1%
1980	27,318		−10.2%
1990	24,730		−9.5%
2000	23,329		−5.7%
2010	25,340		8.6%
2020	29,963		18.2%

=== 2020 census ===
As of the 2020 census, Hazleton had a population of 29,963. The median age was 35.6 years. 25.9% of residents were under the age of 18 and 14.5% of residents were 65 years of age or older. For every 100 females there were 95.1 males, and for every 100 females age 18 and over there were 91.9 males age 18 and over.

99.7% of residents lived in urban areas, while 0.3% lived in rural areas.

There were 10,872 households in Hazleton, of which 35.5% had children under the age of 18 living in them. Of all households, 33.6% were married-couple households, 22.9% were households with a male householder and no spouse or partner present, and 35.4% were households with a female householder and no spouse or partner present. About 29.6% of all households were made up of individuals and 12.9% had someone living alone who was 65 years of age or older.

There were 11,860 housing units, of which 8.3% were vacant. The homeowner vacancy rate was 1.2% and the rental vacancy rate was 4.6%.

Racial composition as of the 2020 census
Race	Number	Percent
White	11,611	38.8%
Black or African American	1,236	4.1%
American Indian and Alaska Native	205	0.7%
Asian	226	0.8%
Native Hawaiian and Other Pacific Islander	18	0.1%
Some other race	11,407	38.1%
Two or more races	5,260	17.6%
Hispanic or Latino (of any race)	18,898	63.1%

=== 2010 census ===
As of the 2010 census, the racial makeup of the city was 69.4% White (59.0% non-Hispanic/Latino white), 4.0% Black or African American, 0.2% Native American, 0.8% Asian, and 22.0% from other races, and 3.4% were multiracial. Hispanic or Latino of any race were 37.3% of the population. Almost all of the population growth in Hazleton (from 2000 to 2010) consisted of Hispanics and Latinos.

There were 23,340 people, 9,798 households, with 6,162 of these being family households. The population density was 4,123.3 inhabitants per square mile (1,592.0/km^{2}). There were 9,409 housing units, at an average density of 1,901.5 per square mile (734.2/km^{2}).

There were 9,798 households, out of which 22.8% had children under the age of 18 living with them, 45.9% were married couples living together, 19.8% had a female householder with no husband present, and 17.1% were non-family households. 21.9% were made up of individuals, and 15.0% had someone living alone who was 65 years of age or older. The average household size was 2.54 and the average family size was 3.19.

In the city, the population was spread out, with 25.3% under the age of 18, 10.3% from 18 to 24, 24.1% from 25 to 44, 24.2% from 45 to 64, and 16.1% who were 65 years of age or older. The median age was 35 years. For every 100 females, there were 83.6 males. For every 100 females age 18 and over, there were 90.4 males.

=== Racial and ethnic composition ===
Hazleton, Pennsylvania – Racial and ethnic composition Note: the US Census treats Hispanic/Latino as an ethnic category. This table excludes Latinos from the racial categories and assigns them to a separate category. Hispanics/Latinos may be of any race.
Race / Ethnicity (NH = Non-Hispanic)	Pop 1980	Pop 1990	Pop 2000	Pop 2010	Pop 2020	% 1980	% 1990	% 2000	% 2010	% 2020
White alone (NH)	27,085	24,259	21,741	14,955	9,894	99.15%	98.10%	93.19%	59.02%	33.02%
Black or African American alone (NH)	13	47	135	497	500	0.05%	0.19%	0.58%	1.96%	1.67%
Native American or Alaska Native alone (NH)	0	10	34	24	21	0.00%	0.04%	0.15%	0.09%	0.07%
Asian alone (NH)	149	164	152	184	193	0.55%	0.66%	0.65%	0.73%	0.64%
Pacific Islander alone (NH)	N/A	N/A	3	5	8	N/A	N/A	0.01%	0.02%	0.03%
Some Other Race alone (NH)	0	1	5	46	169	0.00%	0.00%	0.02%	0.18%	0.56%
Mixed race or Multiracial (NH)	N/A	N/A	127	175	280	N/A	N/A	0.54%	0.69%	0.93%
Hispanic or Latino (any race)	71	249	1,132	9,454	18,898	0.26%	1.01%	4.85%	37.31%	63.07%
Total	27,318	24,730	23,329	25,340	29,963	100.00%	100.00%	100.00%	100.00%	100.00%

== Economy ==
Hazleton's major mining and garment industries have disappeared over the past 50 years. Through the efforts of CANDO and a practical highway infrastructure, Hazle Township's Humboldt Industrial Park has become home to many industries. Coca-Cola, American Eagle Outfitters, Hershey, Office Max, Simmons Bedding Company, Michaels, Network Solutions, AutoZone, General Mills, Steelcase, WEIR Minerals, EB Brands and Amazon.com are just some of the large companies with distribution, manufacturing, or logistic operations in Hazleton.

In 2010, 6.7% of residents had an income below the poverty level, as compared to a statewide average of 12.5%.

== Arts and culture ==
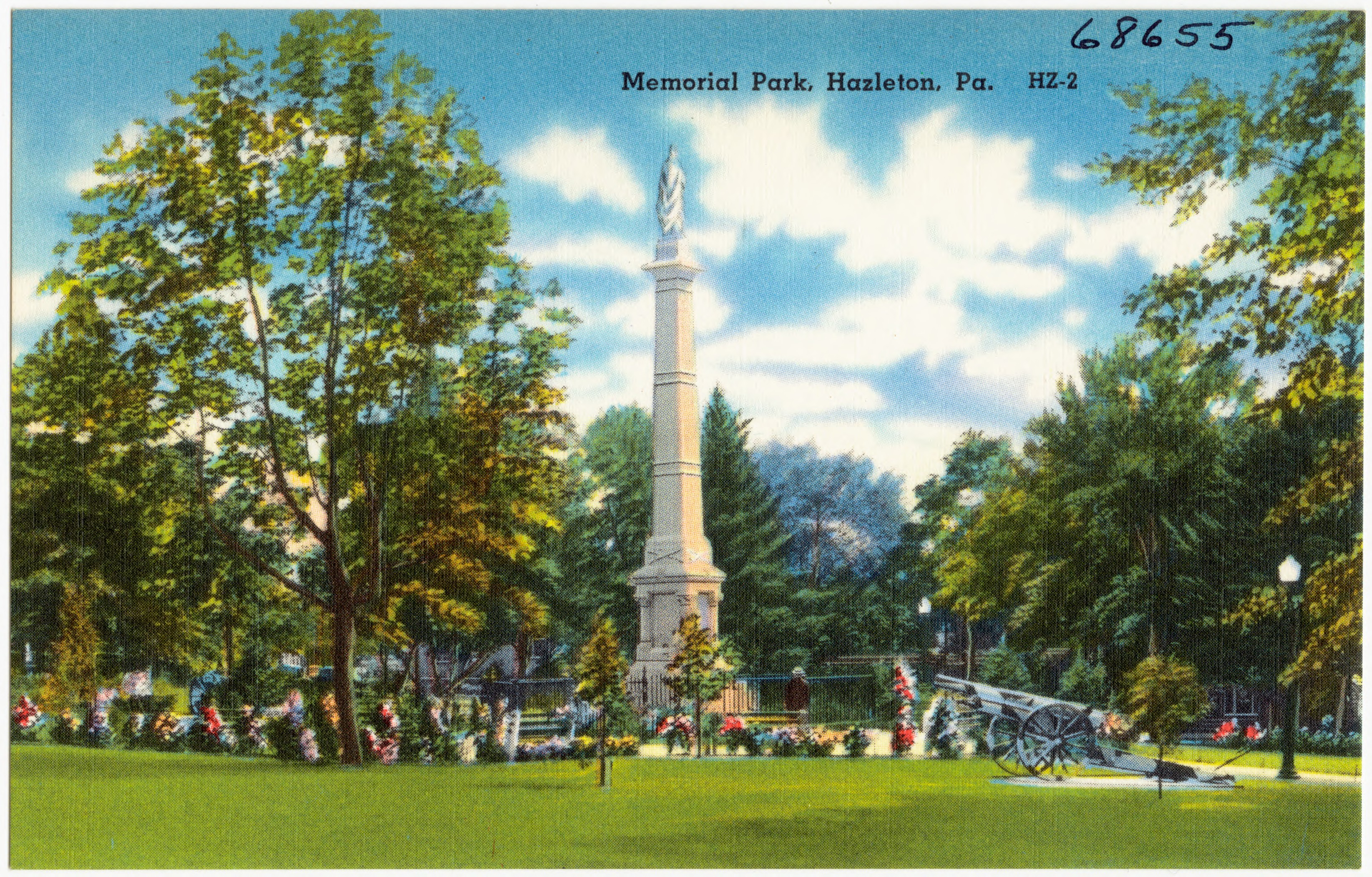
Historic postcard of Memorial Park in Hazleton

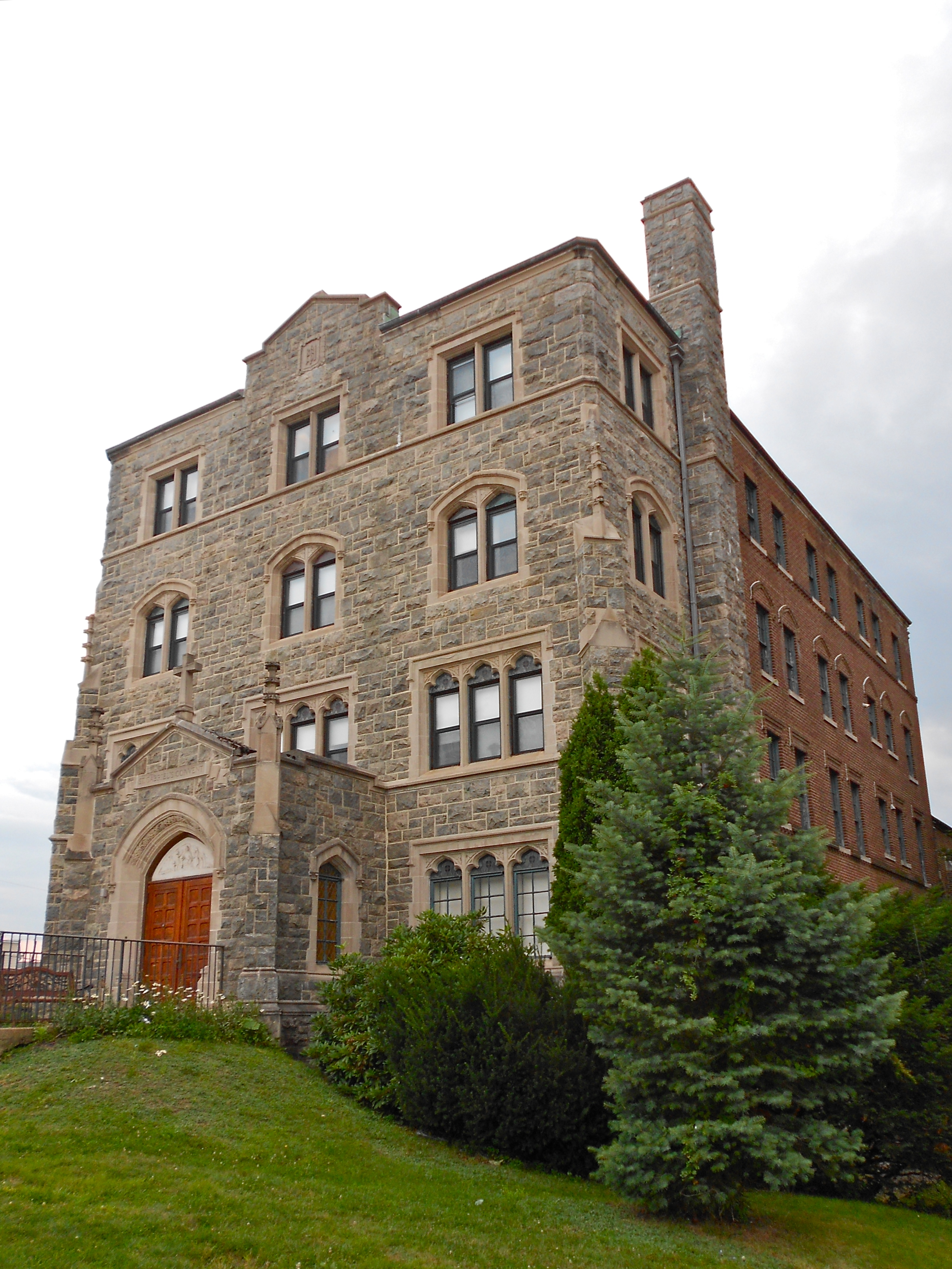
St. Gabriel's Convent

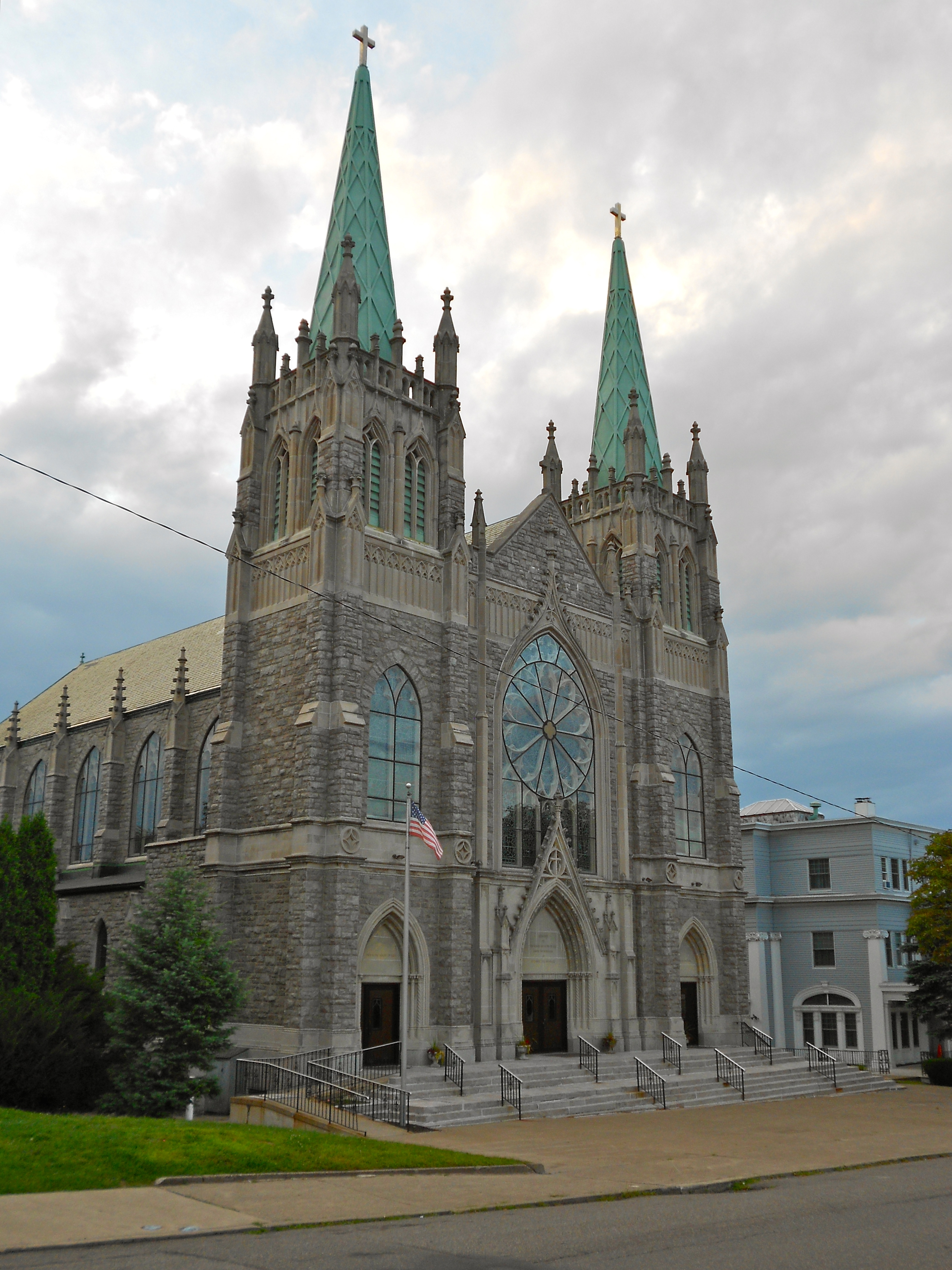
St. Gabriel's Church

=== Regional parks and outdoor entertainment ===
- Altmiller Playground
- Eagle Rock Resort (private)
- Edgewood In The Pines Golf Course
- Greater Hazleton Rails To Trails
- Hazle Township Community Park & Soccer Fields
- Hickory Run State Park
- Lehigh Gorge State Park
- Memorial Park

=== Organizations and historic locations ===
- Altamont Hotel
- Duplan Silk Building
- Eckley Miners' Village
- St. Gabriel's Catholic Parish Complex
- Hazleton Cemetery (the Vine Street Cemetery)
- Hazleton National Bank
- Israel Platt Pardee Mansion
- Markle Banking & Trust Company Building
- Lattimer Massacre, which began at State Route 924 near Harwood
- MPB Community Players
- Nuremberg Community Players
- Pennsylvania Theatre of Performing Arts (PTPA)
- Saint Joseph Slovak Roman Catholic Church
- Traders Bank Building

=== Annual festivals ===
Hazleton's annual street festival, Funfest, is celebrated usually during the second weekend of September. The festival includes a craft show, a car show, entertainment from local bands, and many games of chance. The Funfest parade is held on Sunday (during the Funfest weekend). Valley Day is celebrated in Conyngham during the first weekend of August. Many church festivals are celebrated to preserve the Italian heritage of Hazleton. This would include the Festival of the Madonna del Monte at Most Precious Blood Roman Catholic Church (in Hazleton).

=== Sports ===
Hazleton was a long-time home to minor league baseball. On April 14, 1934, the Philadelphia Phillies entered into an affiliation agreement with the New York–Penn League Hazleton Mountaineers. This was the first ever minor league affiliation for the Phillies. The last minor-league club to play in Hazleton was the Hazleton Dodgers in 1950, a Brooklyn Dodgers farm-club which played in the Class D North Atlantic League.

Hazleton was also home to four franchises in the old Eastern Basketball League, precursor to the Continental Basketball Association: the Hazleton Mountaineers (1946–48, 1951–52), Hazleton Hawks (1953–62), Hazleton Bits (1971–72), and Hazleton Bullets (1972–77). Despite advancing to the EBL championship finals on four separate occasions, Hazleton teams were never able to capture a league championship.

Penn State Hazleton sponsors 8 varsity teams that compete at the intercollegiate level in the United States Collegiate Athletic Association and Penn State University Athletic Conference. Penn State is home to baseball, men's and women's basketball, softball, men's golf, men's and women's soccer, and women's volleyball. All teams play their games at the Athletic Center on campus, with the exceptions of baseball, which plays at Hazle Township Community Ballpark, and softball, which plays in Drums. The golf team plays at surrounding courses in the Northeast region.

== Media ==
=== Newspapers ===
- Standard-Speaker
- Latino News
- El Mensajero (serves as one of the Hispanic/Latino newspapers in Hazleton)

=== Radio ===
- WGMA 1490 AM

=== Television ===
- WYLN-35
- WOLF-TV (channel 56)

Hazleton is served by the Scranton/Wilkes-Barre media market, which is the 55th largest U.S. television market.

Sam-Son Productions (public-access television) is located in Hazleton.

== Education ==
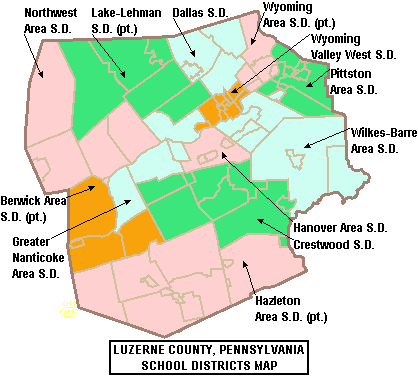
A map of Luzerne County with Hazleton Area School District highlighted in pink

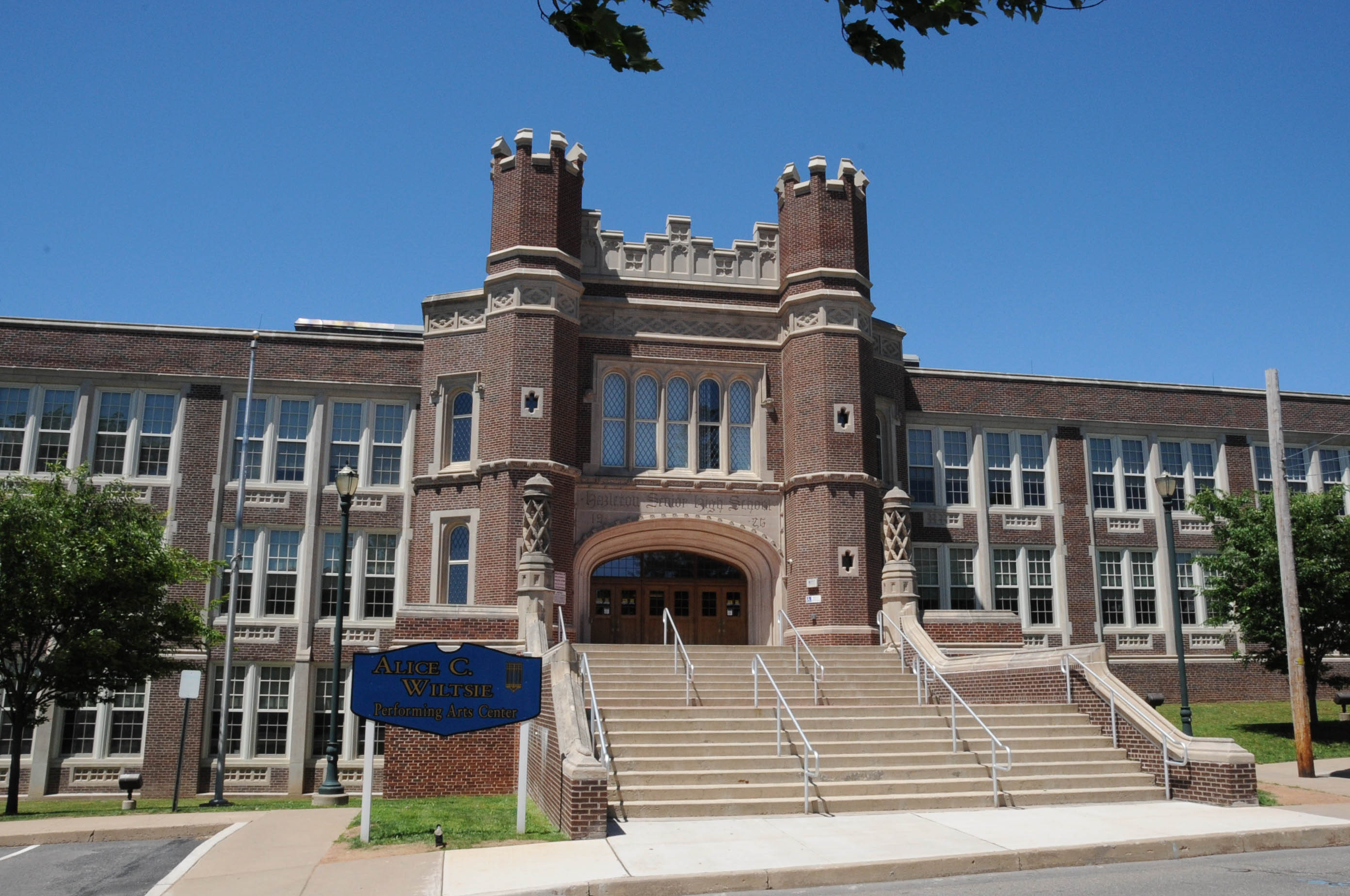
Hazleton Area High School

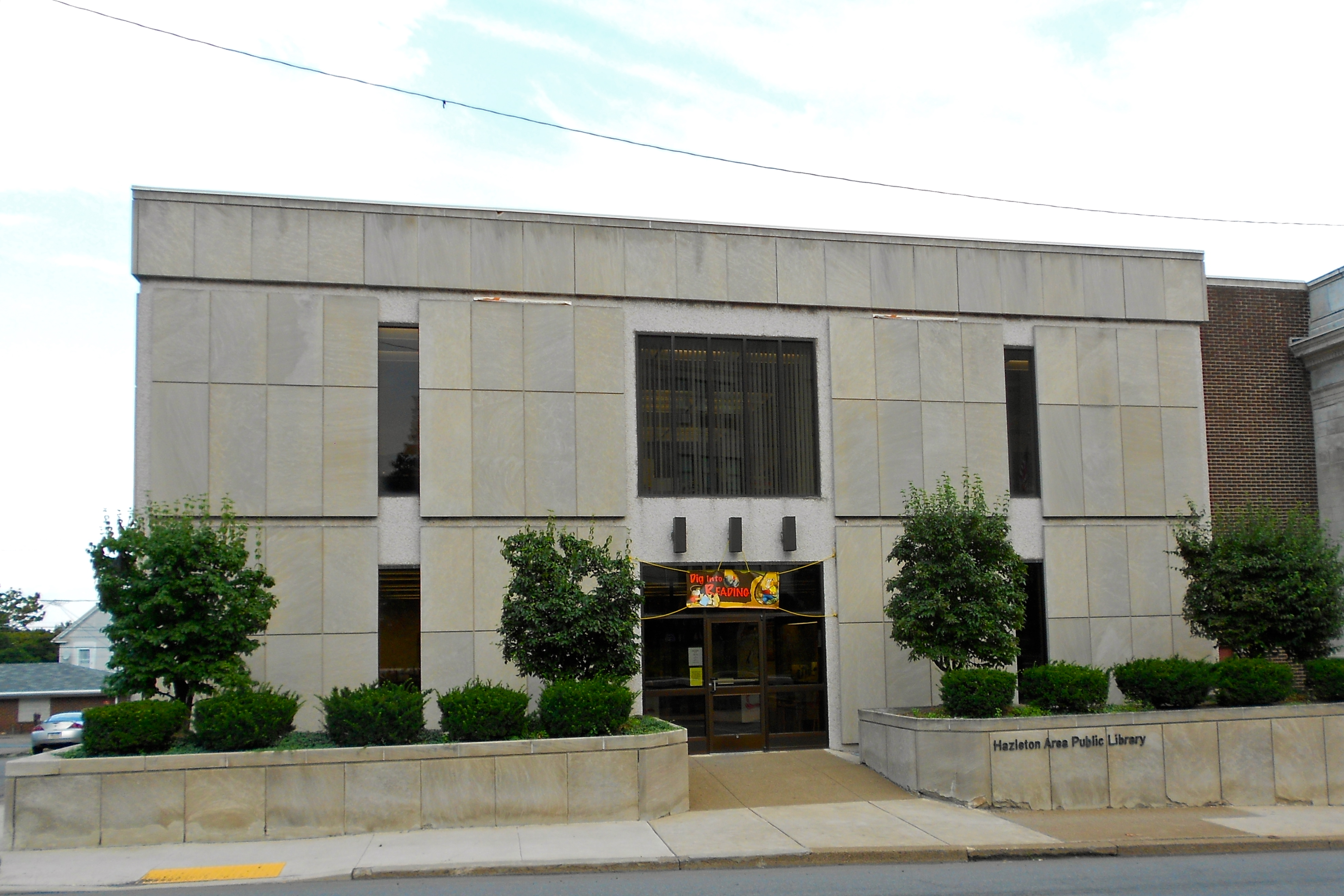
Hazleton Area Public Library

The first school was built in the 1830s by the Hazleton Coal Company. It was a private elementary school at the corner of Church and Green Streets (the present-day site of Hazleton City Hall). Hazleton High School (the first high school) was built in 1875 at the corner of Pine and Hemlock Streets (the present-day site of the Pine Street Playground). Bishop Hafey High School was Hazleton's only Roman Catholic High School; it was owned by the Diocese of Scranton. It was opened in 1971 and closed in 2007 (by the order of former Bishop Joseph F. Martino).

=== Hazleton Area School District ===
The Hazleton Area School District (HASD) operates public schools serving the city limits. The Hazleton Area School District encompasses approximately 250 square miles (650 km^{2}). According to 2000 federal census data, it served a resident population of 70,042. By 2010, the district's population increased to 72,862 people. The educational attainment levels for the Hazleton Area School District population (25 years old and over) were 83.8% high school graduates and 15.2% college graduates. As of 2015, there were 10,871 pupils in Hazleton Area School District. There are three schools in Hazleton (operated by the HASD):

- Hazleton Elementary/Middle School
- Heights-Terrace Elementary/Middle School
- Arthur Street Elementary School

High school students in the district attend Hazleton Area High School in Hazle Township.

=== Private schools ===
- Holy Family Academy
- Immanuel Christian School
- MMI Preparatory School

=== Colleges and universities ===
- Lackawanna College
- Luzerne County Community College
- Penn State Hazleton

=== Other ===
- The Greater Hazleton Historical Society and Museum
- Hazleton Area Public Library

== Infrastructure ==
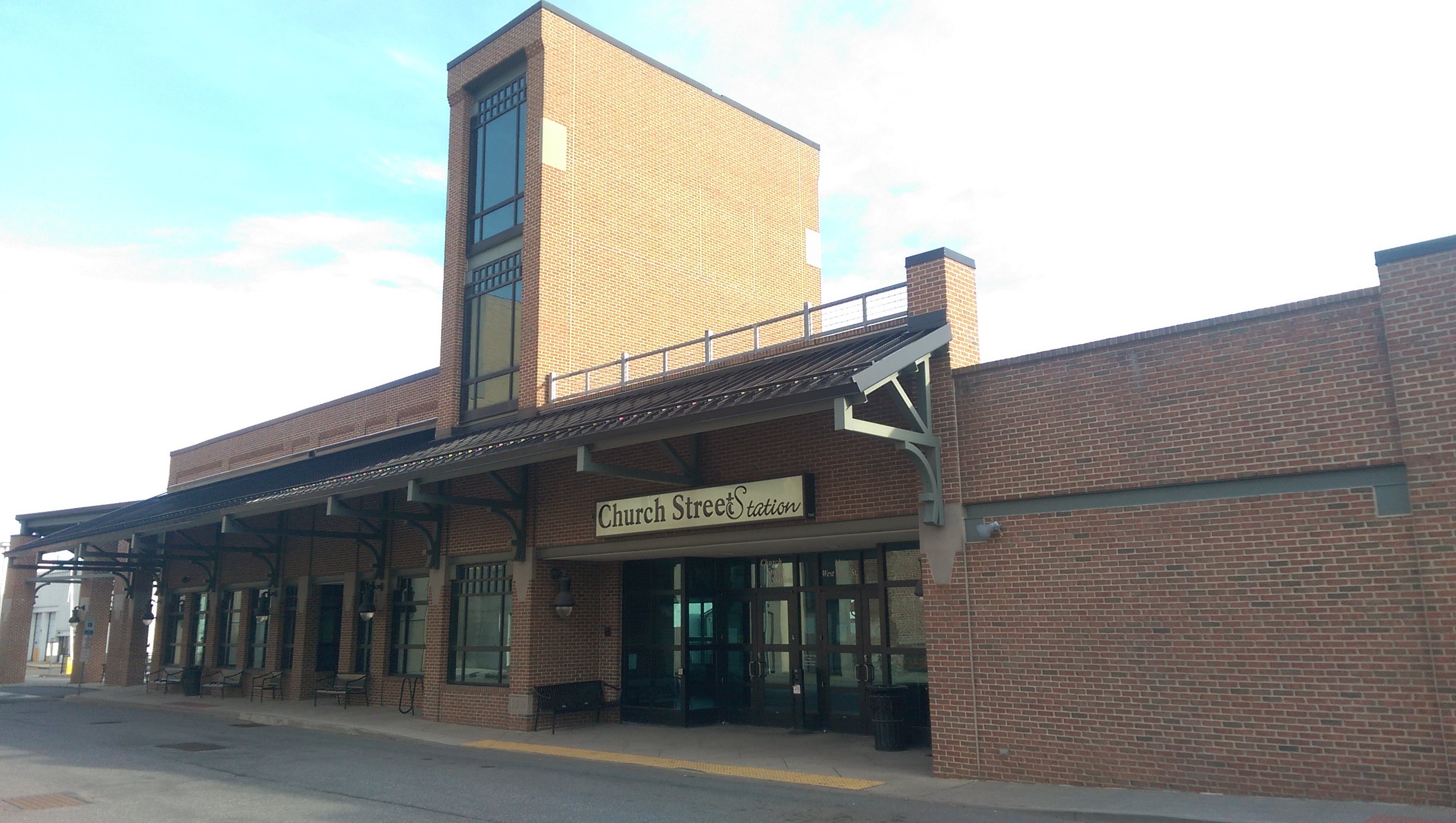
Hazleton Public Transit in Hazleton

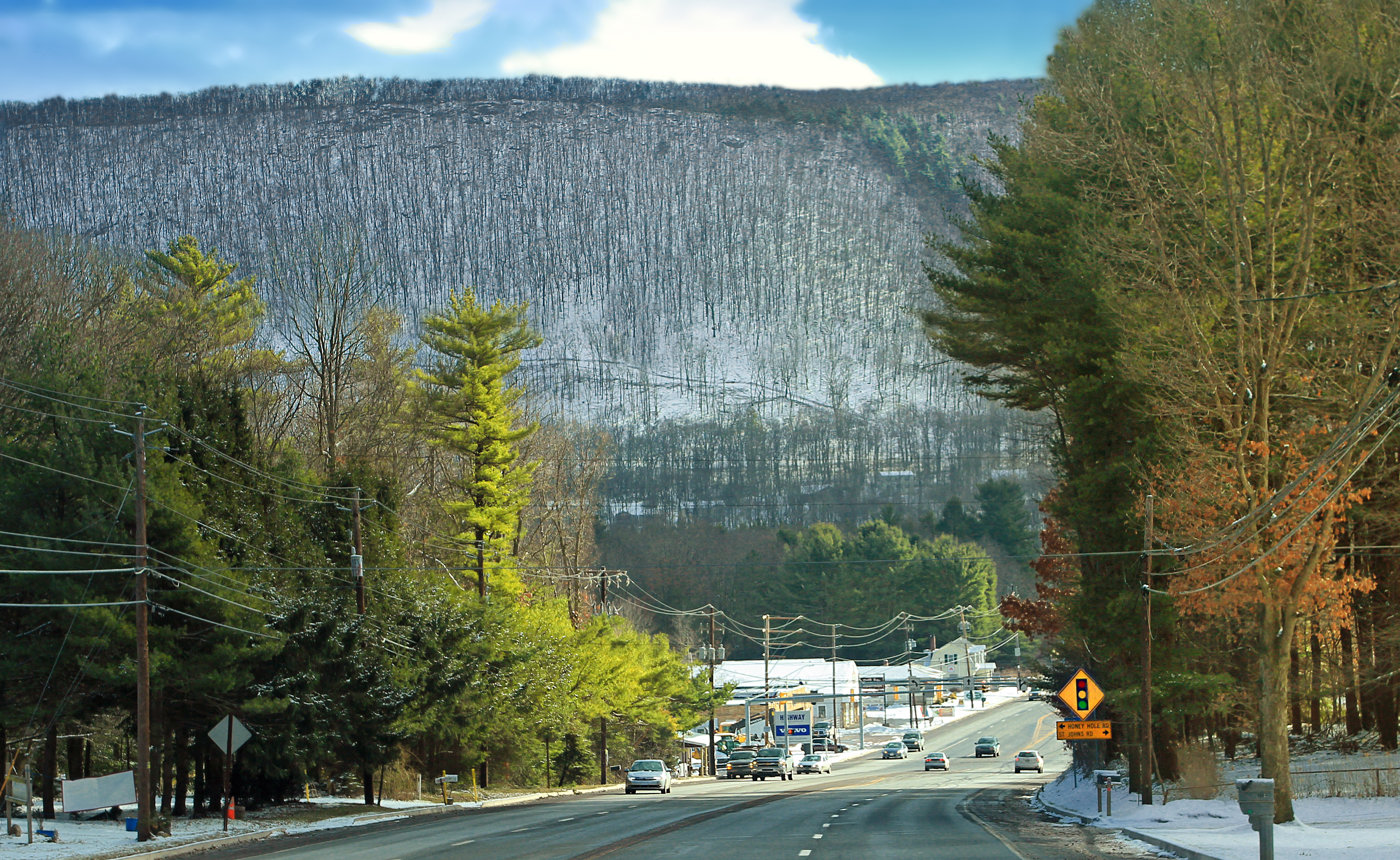
PA 309 just outside the city

=== Public transportation ===
- Public transportation is provided by the Hazleton Public Transit, which operates nine routes throughout the city and neighboring communities.

Several jitney companies operate from Hazleton through Stroudsburg to Paterson and New York City via I-80.

=== Major highways ===
- There are three nearby Interstates:
  - I-80
  - I-81
  - I-476 / Penna Turnpike NE Extension
- There are five major inbound roadways:
  - PA 93 (Broad Street)
  - PA 309 (Church Street)
  - PA 424 (Arthur Gardner Parkway)
  - PA 924 (CAN-DO Expressway, Broad Street (Conjuncture with PA-93), 15th Street, Terminus at PA-309)
  - PA 940 (Fisher's Avenue, Terminus at PA-309 and 22nd Street)

=== Rail ===
Norfolk Southern Railway and Reading Blue Mountain and Northern Railroad are used for commercial rail traffic.

=== Air transit ===
- Wilkes-Barre/Scranton International Airport (in Pittston Township)
- Hazleton Municipal Airport (two miles northwest of Hazleton)

== Notable people ==
- Lou Barletta, former mayor of Hazleton and former U.S. congressman
- Edward Bonin, former mayor of Hazleton and former U.S. congressman
- Frank Borzage, Academy Award-winning film director
- Hubie Brown, basketball coach and television analyst
- Russ Canzler, former professional baseball player
- Flick Colby, former choreographer
- John Dapcevich, former mayor of Juneau, Alaska
- Carl Duser, former professional baseball player
- Todd A. Eachus, former Pennsylvania State Representative
- Dan Flood, former U.S. congressman
- Thomas R. Kline, lawyer
- Sarah Knauss, longest documented living American, world's third longest living documented person (until age 119)
- Norm Larker (Beaver Meadows), player for the LA Dodgers
- Charles Lemmond, former state senator
- Sherrie Levine, photographer and appropriation artist
- H. Craig Lewis, former state senator
- Joe Maddon, Major League Baseball manager
- Don Malkames, cinematographer
- Tom Matchick, MLB player
- David Micahnik (born 1938), Olympic fencer
- Judith Nathan, wife of former New York City Mayor Rudolph Giuliani
- Jack Palance (Hazle Township), Oscar-winning actor
- Eddie Rambeau, singer, songwriter, and actor.
- Andrew Soltis, chess grandmaster
- John Thomas Sweeney, murderer of Dominique Dunne
- Mike Tresh, MLB catcher
- Bob Tucker, NFL tight end with the New York Giants
- June Winters, actress and singer

== Sister cities ==
Hazleton's sister cities are:

- (Republic of Ireland) Donegal, Limerick, Letterkenny - Ireland
- Corleone, Cilento, Bellagio, Positano, Capri, Campania - Italy
- Ayn al-Tamr - Iraq
