= Israel Platt Pardee Mansion =

Historic house in Pennsylvania, United States

- U.S. National Register of Historic Places
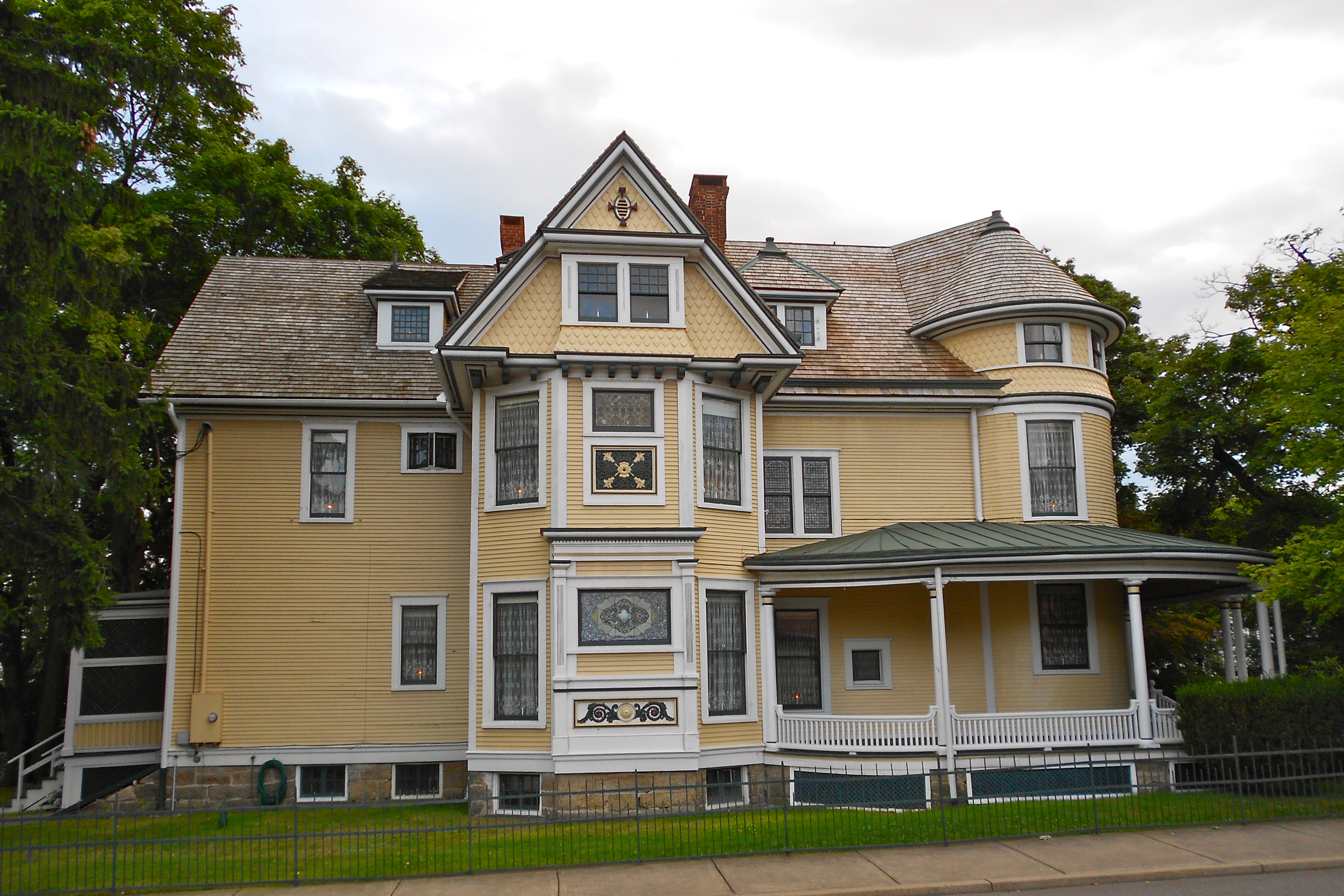
- Main house in 2013

- Location within Pennsylvania Location within the United States
- Interactive map showing the location of Israel Platt Pardee Mansion
- Location: 235 N. Laurel St. and 28 Aspen St., Hazleton, Pennsylvania
- Coordinates: 40°57′36″N 75°58′22″W
- Area: 0.3 acres (0.12 ha)
- Built: 1893
- Architect: Barber, George W.
- Architectural style: Queen Anne
- NRHP reference No.: 84003487
- Added to NRHP: January 12, 1984

The Israel Platt Pardee Mansion is an historic home which is located in Hazleton, Luzerne County, Pennsylvania.

It was added to the National Register of Historic Places in 1984.

== History and architectural features ==
Designed by architect George Franklin Barber, this historic structure was built in 1893. It is a large, three-story, nineteen-room, clapboarded, Victorian dwelling that was created in the Queen Anne style. It measures approximately fifty feet wide, seventy-five feet deep, and fifty feet tall, and features a huge, tin-roofed wraparound porch and a turret. Also located on the property is a contributing carriage house. The house was built by Israel Platt Pardee (1852 - 1934), son of Ario Pardee (1810 - 1892) founder of Hazleton.

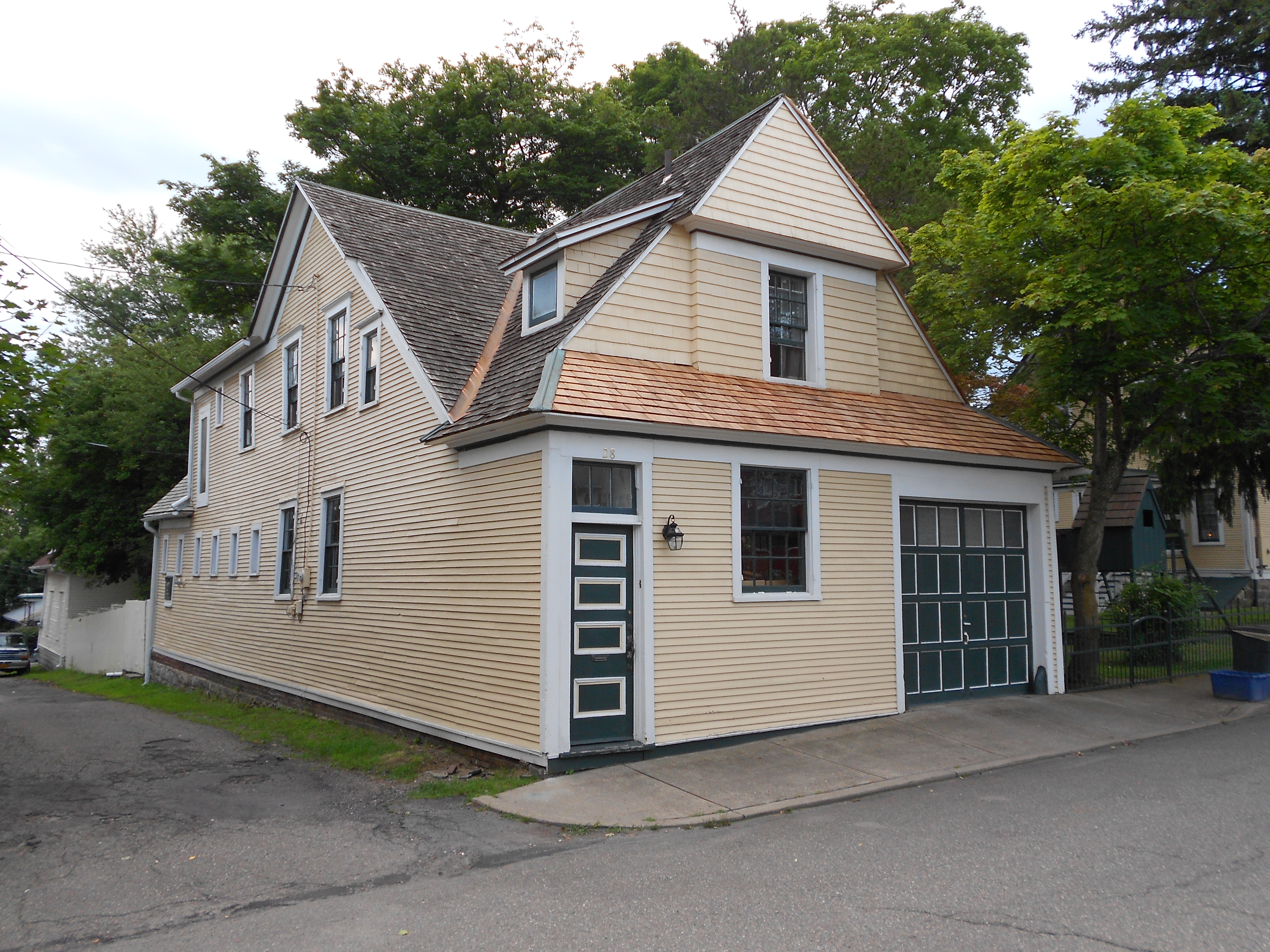
Carriage House
