= Susquehanna and Tioga Turnpike =

19th-century turnpike in Pennsylvania

Route information
- Length: 100 mi (160 km)

Major junctions
- South end: Berwick, Pennsylvania
- North end: Elmira, New York

Location
- Country: United States
- States: Pennsylvania, New York
- Counties: Columbia, Luzerne, Tioga

Highway system
- Auto trails

The Susquehanna and Tioga Turnpike; also called the Berwick and Tioga Turnpike, and Susquehanna & Tioga Turnpike connecting via the high ground (Note: Hurlbert in his "The Paths of Inland Commerce" cautions the reader that the Native American Trails were well conceived all weather connections, and to be all weather, generally stuck to heights and ridgelines to keep one's moccasins dry.) of tributary valleys Berwick and upstream, Tioga—chartered & incorporated in 1806, the toll road, like many Middle Ages toll roads in Europe was opened initially as an animal power (foot traffic) turnpike in Northeastern Pennsylvania connecting early Central and Northern Eastern Pennsylvania along the Main Branch Susquehanna River to Lower New York State. Established in the early American canal age, and undercapitalized, (Note: Many early corporations in America offered investment by subscription—stockholders would pledge payments on a schedule plus pay a down payment, so many such projects (the Schuylkill Canal is another prime example) developed slowly as progress was made only incrementally.) it took several years to gradually extend improved trails in stages 100 miles (160 km) to Elmira, New York from its southern terminus at Berwick, Pennsylvania opposite Nescopeck across the Susquehanna River—in this manner it initially also sufficed as a bridle trail as well. Where demand existed from sources of natural resources or farmers seeking to ship farm goods to markets, it was systematically widened and improved into a wagon road.

Built south to north, the path was opened initially along Amerindian trails, which were widened and improved to enable local farm commerce. When first completed, several northern ascents were far too steep for conversion into a wagon road so required later expensive engineering works by building shoulders into slope traversing roadbeds. Inspired by the earlier Lehigh & Susquehanna Turnpike, the two toll roads connected Philadelphia and New Jersey (Delaware & Lehigh Valley communities) to Lake Erie at Buffalo, New York via the toll bridge across the Susquehanna River between Berwick and Nescopeck—the northern terminus of the Lausanne-Nescopeck Turnpike. (Note: The Lausanne & Nescopeck Turnpike northern terminus was near the mouth of the Nescopeck valley descent from the Lehigh & Susquehanna drainage divide in the low pass under Hazleton, Pennsylvania. The east side drains west via Black Creek 26 miles then outlets into Nescopeck Creek as a main tributary. PA 93 follows much the same path as did the Lausane & Nescopeck Turnpike.)

After the War of 1812, much of Berwick's post war growth and industrial development was because it was one of the first towns with foundries, mills and smithies that could be regularly supplied by the new wonder fuel, Anthracite coming from across the river via the Nescopeck river port from the modest mines at Jeddo, Pennsylvania. Between Nescopeck and Lausanne Landing, the Lehigh & Susquehanna Turnpike passed through the future Beaver Meadows settlement near the Jeddo works (& lands) (Note: The unincorporated community of Jeddo is a neighborhood (suburb) of Beaver Meadows where coal was first mined in the area. First appearing in land purchase records in 1897, decades later large tract of land was subsequently sold to the found the Beaver Meadow Railroad and Coal Company.) that were the predecessor to, and inspiration of the industrial pioneers of the Beaver Meadow Railroad and Coal Company.

Along its route passing through Columbia County, Luzerne County, Sullivan County, and Bradford Counties. Via the Lausanne-Nescopeck Turnpike across the river, the turnpike offered a road connecting to the Lehigh River and Lehigh Valley, and after 1818, the Lehigh Canal connecting communities serviced by the road to Allentown, Bethlehem, Easton, and, via the Delaware River or Delaware Canal, Bristol and Philadelphia.

The turnpike was established in 1807 and completed in 1825 and provided the shortest route between Elmira and Berwick. Traffic along it mostly ceased in 1907, during the era when auto-clubs had pressed state and local governments to connect American cities and towns by a system of paved roads, in response to the explosion of interest in owning and driving "horseless carriages"—early automobiles and motor trucks (Lorries). Tolls along the turnpike ranged from $0.03 to $0.20. The turnpike was commonly used for lime, iron, salt, and plaster (gypsum) mineral transportation by pack mule trains, and, later, wagons. After the 1826 passage of the initial Main Line of Public Works legislation created the Pennsylvania Canal System, Berwick and at several other places, the Turnpike also connected to the Pennsylvania Canal system.

== History ==
The first portion of the Susquehanna and Tioga Turnpike authorized on March 19, 1804. Starting on March 20, 1806, it was legally permitted to build turnpikes in Pennsylvania. Six people from Philadelphia and six from Lycoming County were appointed as commissioners for the company. In 1807, the company President, Managers and Company of the Susquehanna and Tioga Turnpike Road was formed for the purpose of building a turnpike from Berwick, Pennsylvania to Elmira, New York. The state of Pennsylvania donated 400 acres to the turnpike. Construction of the turnpike started in Berwick in 1808. From here it proceeded north, reaching Loyalsock Creek in 1808, and the Painter Den property in 1809. Work on the turnpike ceased during the War of 1812 but recommenced in 1816. The turnpike reached Towanda in 1818, Bradford County in 1823, and its northern terminus in 1825. Soon after the turnpike was started, Andrew Shiner (1757-1844) was contracted to improve the turnpike, and by 1810, the Susquehanna and Tioga Turnpike was the first road in good condition for wagons in its part of Pennsylvania.

The Susquehanna and Tioga Turnpike was built by men who lived in shanties, moving along the road as it was built. Both the people who built the turnpike and those who first settled along it between 1820 and 1825 were predominantly Germans from southern Pennsylvania. However between 1840 and 1845, the area near the turnpike began to be settled by people of Irish ancestry as well.

Starting in 1827, the Berwick and Towanda Turnpike Company ran stagecoaches along the Susquehanna and Tioga Turnpike. The stagecoaches changed every 12 miles except for the part of the turnpike that went over Red Rock Mountain. The stagecoaches left Berwick twice a day.

The turnpike was closed in 1845 and changed to a public road. Starting in 1847, the road was largely succeeded by Pennsylvania Route 487, which runs near the turnpike in Rickets Glen State Park, and U.S. Route 220. From 1852 to 1907 the turnpike was a county road. Except for rare traffic from jeeps and 4-wheel drive vehicles, the turnpike has not been used since 1907. A portion of the road was referred to as "useless, inconvenient and burdensome".

The turnpike is eligible for listing on the National Register of Historic Places.

== Route description ==
The Susquehanna and Tioga Turnpike started in Berwick and proceeded north over Jonestown Mountain (Knob Mountain) along modern-day Summerhill Avenue, Foundryville Road, and State Route 1025 to Jonestown on Huntington Creek. From there it went through Fairmount Township and Huntington Township in Luzerne County, along SR 4011, still locally known as the Old Tioga Turnpike. From there, the turnpike followed a meandering and difficult route up Red Rock Mountain along PA 487, and passed along the west side of Ganoga Lake. It then went through Sullivan County in a dead straight track to the community of Mildred along modern day State Game Road, Old Berwick Turnpike, Hayes Road, and jeep trails connecting the three; modern day PA 487 bypasses this route to the communities of Lopez and Ricketts. The road then continued along Potuck Road, Horseshoe Road, and Turnpike Street into Dushore, and then north to Monroe on US 220. An area of the road in Sullivan County was referred to as the "Devil's mile" due to its poor condition. Upon reaching the border of Bradford County, the turnpike went over Huckleberry Mountain to Monroeton, then bypassing Towanda to the west on roads still named the Burlington Turnpike and Berwick Turnpike. At the state line near Wellsburg, the road continued on north along NY 427 as a public road to Elmira, where it connected with a plank road running from east to west.

The Susquehanna and Tioga Turnpike served as an extension to the Susquehanna and Lehigh Turnpike, whose terminus was at Nescopeck Falls. The turnpike was part of a larger network of turnpikes that formed a path from Philadelphia to Seneca Lake and beyond to Lake Ontario and Niagara.

The Susquehanna and Tioga Turnpike was always rough and muddy and contained potholes during the summer. In the winter the turnpike was icy partially due to beavers flooding the area near the turnpike. Both conditions often caused vehicles on the turnpike to become stuck. A common remedy to this was to create a corduroy road consisting of logs laid perpendicularly to the rails below them. The turnpike was also not wide enough for two vehicles, thus rendering collisions common. Additionally, at least initially, some parts of the turnpike were too steep for horses to travel up, though the turnpikes of the day often had multiple paths some of which shortened the road traveled for foot traffic, and those with longer ascents and descents along a slanted traverse for horse and pack animal traffic—with still others, widened and improved to allow wagon traffic enabling raw materials and produce deliveries to trail heads.

== Financial information ==
Tolls along the Susquehanna and Tioga Turnpike were less expensive for vehicles with one horse than those with two horses. Other animals carried along the turnpike were charged on a case-by-case basis depending on the type of animal. For instance, in 1807 the toll for 20 sheep was $0.04, the toll for 20 hogs was $0.06, and the toll for 20 cows was $0.12. The toll for a person riding a horse or mule was $0.03. The toll for a two-wheeled vehicle with a single horse was $0.06 and with two horses the toll was $0.08. The toll for a four-wheeled vehicle with two horses was $0.12 and for four horses it was $0.20.

Tollgates were built along the turnpike to hold its revenue until the company's stock was retired. One of the tollgates was called Watson Place and was most likely located near Ganoga Lake. In 1807 the Susquehanna and Tioga Turnpike made $1339.07. Initially $60,000 of stock in the form of 600 shares was created for the company. Stock in the company that owned the turnpike was sold at $100 per share. 10% of this stock was payable at the time of the purchase and the rest came in installments. The Susquehanna and Tioga Turnpike received a moderate amount of use, especially during the spring, when the Susquehanna River was commonly used as a method of travel to New York.

== Economic role ==
While the Commonwealth of Pennsylvania provided some financial aid in the construction of the Susquehanna and Tioga Turnpike, stockholders in the turnpike's company also received great expense. The turnpike did not pay off its investors. Despite this, it did improve the lives of the people near it. In 1822, the Committee on Roads, Bridges and Inland Navigation of the Senate stated that "The [Susquehanna and Tioga] Turnpike will afford facilities for traveling and transportation unequaled, as to extent, in the United States."

A primary use of the Susquehanna and Tioga Turnpike was to move livestock from northern Pennsylvania to the more densely populated areas along the Susquehanna River. It was also used to move lime and iron northwards and to move plaster and salt southwards. Early travelers on the turnpike also included loggers. Historically mail was delivered every three days along the turnpike. Historically the turnpike gave some importance to the community of Jonestown. It also provided employment for many people and brought settlers into Columbia and Sullivan Counties.

== See also ==
- Susquehanna and Lehigh Turnpike and Road Company was incorporated 1804.
