= East Mauch Chunk, Pennsylvania =

Coordinates: 40°52′25″N 75°44′00″W

East Mauch Chunk is a former independent borough in Carbon County, Pennsylvania, United States. Located along the east bank of the Lehigh River on the opposite bank from the town business district, it was part of Northeastern Pennsylvania.

Originally in the former Township of Mauch Chunk, the Court of Quarter Sessions of the Peace of Carbon County, Pennsylvania, incorporated land on both sides of the Lehigh River into the Borough of Mauch Chunk by decree of January 26, 1850, which became effective January 31, 1850. On January 21, 1854, an Act of Assembly was approved by Governor William Bigler incorporating that portion of the Borough of Mauch Chunk to the northeast of the center line of the Lehigh River into a separate borough by the name of the Borough of East Mauch Chunk.

On February 16, 1954, the Boroughs of Mauch Chunk and East Mauch Chunk entered into an agreement to hold a referendum on May 18, 1954, to determine if the boroughs should be consolidated as the Borough of Jim Thorpe. The referendum was approved by wide margins, with voters in the Borough of Mauch Chunk voting 1026 in favor to 90 against, and the Borough of East Mauch Chunk voting 1179 in favor to 109 against. As of January 3, 1955, the two boroughs were united.

== Geography ==
The neighborhood is located along the eastern left bank of the Lehigh River on the opposite bank from the Jim Thorpe business district. Situated on a gently rising slope of Bear Mountain, and its street grid is arrayed along either side of PA 903 which proceeds almost due northeast roughly parallel to the south-facing escarpment of Bear Mountain to connect with Albrightsville and originates across the bridge joining the neighborhood with Jim Thorpe's business district and Tees into US 209. By the 1790s, the area above the Lehigh Gap was being regularly penetrated by pioneers, and logging companies, in the face of the developing energy crisis, began small scale operations. Sitting to south of the dominant height of Broad Mountain across the Lehigh from where the Nesquehoning Creek crashes into the Lehigh in direct opposition, their confluence skews off at right angles to both in a wide mile long 'slack water pool' that sits between railyards on both banks and was the historic divide between the Mauch Chunk sides. Today's town, Jim Thorpe consisting of both halves is joined by a bridge, which was not so in the earliest days.

East Mauch Chunk had a bridge crossing the Lehigh Gorge above the railroad tracks of the Beaver Meadow Railroad, Lehigh Valley Railroad, and the Lehigh & Susquehanna Railroad giving access to the resort Inn above the picturesque Glen Onoko Falls. The land of East Mauch Chunk above the cut bank of the river floodplain slopes gradually up and away to the northeast from the river, and homeowners have a beautiful view supporting the region's nickname.

East Mauch Chunk was occupied first by European pioneering employees of the Lehigh Coal Mine Company in the early 1790s as a logging camp supporting the building of coal arks on the bank below and after Lausanne was settled, such crews timbering and boat building stayed at the Landing Tavern (and Inn) across the river along the Lausanne-Nescopeck Turnpike toll house at Lausanne Landing, then in 1818 became suburb of the Lehigh Coal & Navigation Company's fast growing activities, then found active growth as a railroad company town servicing the left bank rail yards of the Beaver Creek Railroad and Mining Company, then the successor Lehigh Valley Railroad founded in the 1870s.

Today the village is primarily a bedroom community and also a tourist waypoint as the southern entrance to Lehigh Gorge State Park; among other traffic, white water rafting and water sports sporting companies shuttle tourists into and through the community. The Norfolk Southern Railroad and Reading Blue Mountain and Northern Railroads still utilize the rail yard along the foot of Bear Mountain which towers above the town to the east and south. Mount Pisgah towering above Mauch Chunk Creek through the town's business district, as it splits into Pisgah Ridge and Nesquehoning Mountain and the flanking ridgelines of Mahoning Mountain to the south and Broad Mountain to the north are all seen nearly end on from East Mauch Chunk, making for a scenic vista in nearly any direction.
