= Beaver Meadows, Pennsylvania =

Borough in Pennsylvania, US

- Borough
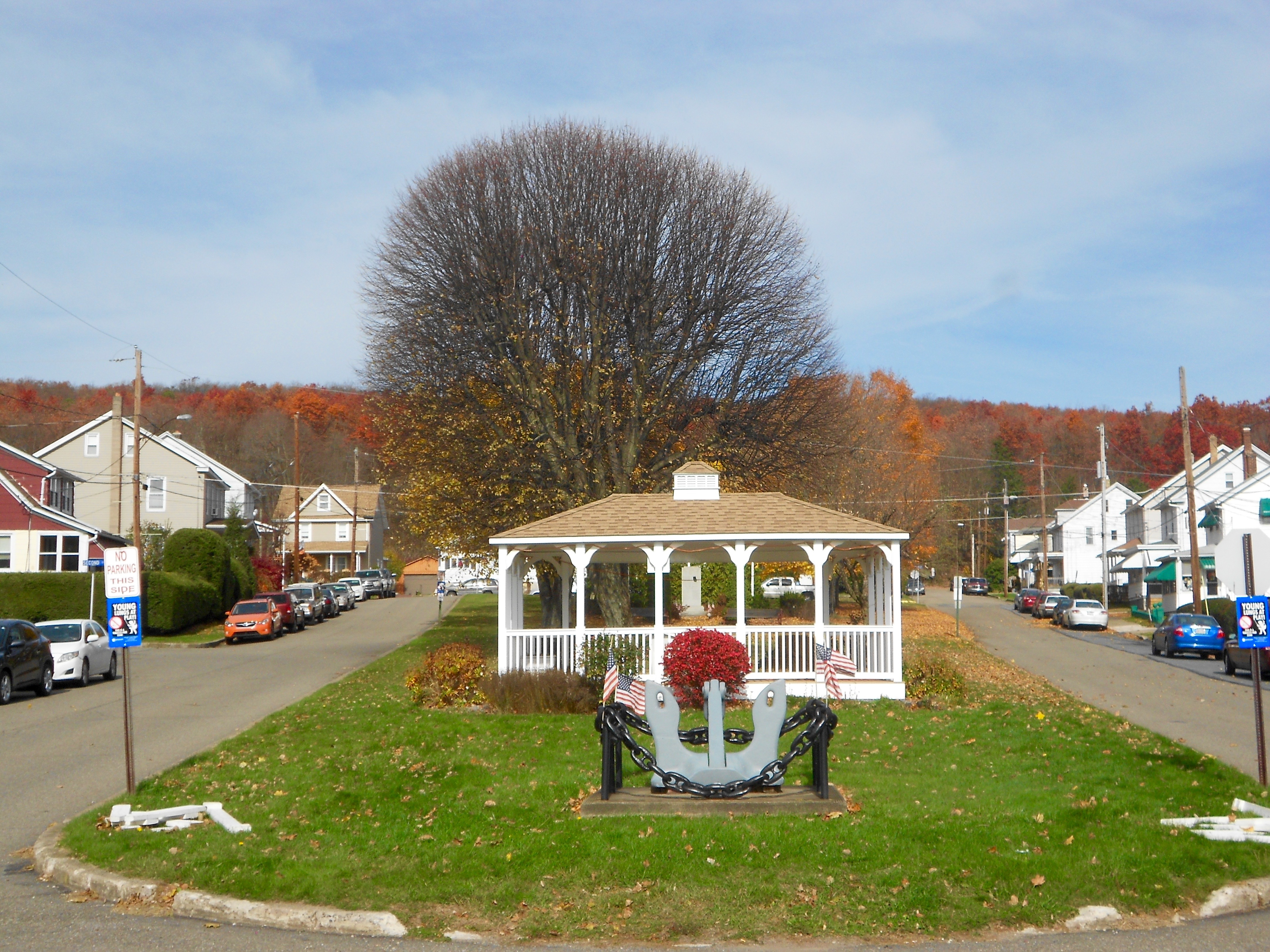
- Gazebo on Church Street, November 2016

- Location of Beaver Meadows in Carbon County

- Location of Beaver Meadows in Pennsylvania Beaver Meadows (the United States)
- Coordinates: 40°55′42″N 75°54′46″W
- Country: United States
- State: Pennsylvania
- County: Carbon

Area
  - Total: 0.26 sq mi (0.67 km^{2})
  - Land: 0.26 sq mi (0.67 km^{2})
  - Water: 0 sq mi (0.00 km^{2})
- Elevation: 1,598 ft (487 m)

Population (2020)
  - Total: 897
  - Density: 3,474.7/sq mi (1,341.57/km^{2})
- Time zone: UTC-5 (Eastern)
  - Summer (DST): UTC-4 (EDT)
- ZIP code: 18216
- Area code: 570
- FIPS code: 42-04816
- Website: https://www.beavermeadowsborough.com/

Beaver Meadows is a borough in Carbon County, Pennsylvania, United States. It is part of Northeastern Pennsylvania. The population was 897 at the 2020 U.S. census.

== Geography ==
Beaver Meadows is located in northwestern Carbon County at 40°55′42″N 75°54′46″W (40.928438, -75.912787) along Beaver Creek, amidst a historic transportation corridor dating back to Amerindian Trails through the wilderness area known to the Amerindians as "The Great Swamp". The Great Swamp was part of a vastly greater wilderness once known as "St. Anthony’s Wilderness", and, by the Amerindians, the "Towamensing", being an Indian word for "wilderness" — a vast pinewood forest and boggy swamp-plagued valleys watered by springs and mountain creeks such as Quakake Creek, Beaver Creek, Hazel Creek and others from the surrounding mountains. The Amerindians applied the term "Towamensing" to the entire frontier area above Blue Mountain, which, while a valued hunting territory, was considered less favorable to Indian settlements.

Beaver Meadow is at an elevation of 1,598 feet (487 m) above sea level in the valley of Beaver Creek, north of Spring Mountain, part of the Ridge-and-Valley Appalachians. According to the United States Census Bureau, the borough has a total area of 0.26 square miles (0.67 km^{2}), all of it land.

== History ==
=== 18th century ===
Beaver Meadows began as a recognizable and describable landmark, a meadow where beaver dams dotted the landscape, along a well-known Amerindian Trail, known as the "Warriors' Path", and later as well known as the trail used by Moravian Missionaries traveling between Berwick and Bethlehem, then became known as a toll gate/rest stop along the Lehigh and Susquehanna Turnpike, a bridle trail and wagon road chartered in 1804 from Jean's Run near the mouth of Nesquehoning Creek on the Lehigh River in the hamlet and township of Lausanne about nine miles south on the other side of Broad Mountain.

In the 1790s, a large tract of land was registered in the name of tbdl and a few farm houses dotted the valley until in 1812, anthracite coal was discovered in the vicinity of Junedale, a bedroom suburb neighborhood a 1.33 miles (2.14 km) west of Beaver Meadows proper.

In 1752, the lands of Carbon County and Beaver Meadows area were part of Northampton County, one of the three original counties of Pennsylvania, a county as big as New Jersey. the 1790s Warrior's Path was widened into a cart road some called the Lausanne-Nescopeck Road as Moravians increased their connections with the St. John's settlement in the Nescopeck Creek valley.

In 1804, business interests desiring to ship timber to energy-hungry settlements raised money for a wagon road that could support timber sledges in winter snows, and the Lehigh and Susquehanna Turnpike was chartered, which is now closely followed by Pennsylvania Route 93 through the borough from over Broad Mountain at Nesquehoning, leading northwest 4 miles (6 km) to Hazleton and southeast 9 miles (14 km) to U.S. Route 209 in Nesquehoning. Weatherly is 4 miles (6 km) to the east via Spring Mountain Road, where Beaver Creek ends in confluence with Hazel Creek begetting Black Creek.

=== 19th century ===
In 1800, Lausanne was created to provide local government for what is essentially all of present-day Carbon County, Pennsylvania; the eventual townships of East Penn, Lausanne, Mahoning, Banks, Towamensing, Lower Towamensing and Penn Forest; Pennsylvania townships being the most rural of organized municipal governments under the commonwealth constitution.

In 1826, Mauch Chunk, which is present-day Jim Thorpe, and other townships were split out of Lausanne and the center of that township was moved northwards. In 1843, Banks Township was organized, and incorporated the small settlement of Beaver Meadows within its larger girth.

In 1812, the secrets of burning anthracite were mostly yet to be discovered, revealed, and promoted (widely publicized) by Josiah White and Erskine Hazard but blacksmiths were several decades into knowing how to use it as an auxiliary fuel to complement bituminous or charcoal in forge fires, so by 1813 a modest pit mine was opened to provide coal for Berwick and Bloomington. The settlement's first dwelling was built in 1804 of logs. The first houses were built along the main thoroughfare, today's Broad Street east of the junction between Berwick St. (the continuation of the turnpike and Rt-93 to Hazelton) and Main St. westwards to Junedale, Tresckow, and Tamaqua.

Nathan Beach discovered coal in 1812, and opened a quarry in 1813, shipping his coal initially west by wagon to Berwick and Bloomsburg over the Berwick-Nescopeck Toll Bridge. With road improvements, he was able to ship his coal to Lausanne Landing where arks were being built by the Lehigh Coal Mine Company and coal could be transported to Philadelphia.

In 1817, stymied by the slow movements of the Schuylkill Canal board of directors, White and Hazard began the improvements making the one-way Lehigh Navigations in 1818, and travel Lehigh River downstream grew steadily safer. By the end of 1820, the new Lehigh Canal, still rough and unfinished, nonetheless enabled a record 365 long-tons to be shipped to Philadelphia.

By 1823, steady shipments allowed self-funding and the canal was being re-engineered and a gradual conversion begun into a system with two-way locks; its success in providing the affordable fuel to meet the young nation's energy demands, the Erie Canal opening, followed by the news of railroad events in Britain in 1825 began whole chains of events spurring industrial production and railroads.

In 1826, Colonel William H. Wilson moved to the town and built a tavern. In 1831 James Lamison became citizen No. 3 and also opened a tavern. By that time the Beaver Meadow Railroad and Coal Company had been formed and was subscribing stock. It was chartered on April 13, 1830, and the industrial revolution was about to begin using Beaver Meadows as a center. The company laid tracks down the valleys from Beaver and Black Creeks, the tributaries dumped into the Lehigh below and near Penn Haven Junction where the railroad expected to ship to the Lehigh Canal.

Room Run Railroad was occupying space assumed free by the Beaver Meadows planners assumptions. In 1830, operating managers Josiah White and Erskine Hazard of the Lehigh Coal & Navigation Company (LC&N Co.) opened new mines, now freed of immediate or further improvement needs of the Lehigh Canal or the Summit Hill and Mauch Chunk Railroad, in the area of present-day Nesquehoning and building a two-mile funicular railway called the Room Run or Rhume Run Railroad to increase volume shipped by the company. The two railroads contended for the same space. At one point, both companies put armed men into the field, but an amicable settlement was reached but for a rate dispute to break out. This resulted in a resolve to build the railroad all the way to Easton, but a deal was reached after the railroad reached past Mauch Chunk to Parryville, where auxiliary barge loading facilities were built.

The earliest settlement in Banks Township [of 1886] was made in that portion which was in 1897 set off to form the borough of Beaver Meadow. The township was contained within the territory of Lausanne until January, 1842, when it was separately organized, being named in honor of Judge Banks, then on the bench of Northampton county, of which Carbon formed a part until 1843.

— Brenckman, History of Carbon County, Chapter XIII. 1884, 1913 ed.

The Beaver Meadow Railroad & Coal Company bought 200 acres (81 ha) and subcontracted coal operations to A.H. VanCleve and Co., opening their own mines.

By 1833, they began local operations and construction of the railway along the surveyed right of way. Strong-armed by LC&N Co., the company got a change in charter and continued downstream along the Lehigh until LC&N Co. blinked and granted acceptable shipping rate terms. In 1835 they contracted for the first wood-burning steam locomotives to operate in Northampton and Carbon counties, which began operations in 1836. They also demonstrated that a railroad could be built over 30 miles through mountainous country. The Beaver Meadow Railroad became an operational success, and an inspiration.

In 1846, investors began the Delaware, Lehigh, Schuylkill and Susquehanna Railroad Company to link New York Harbor at Jersey City via New Jersey to the Susquehanna River and then the great lakes via a line across the Delaware and up the Lehigh Rivers. They were successful, and represented the beginning of the Lehigh Valley Railroad, whose oldest parts, the Beaver Meadows Railroad, were absorbed in 1866.

== Demographics ==
Historical population
Census	Pop.	Note	%±
1880	502		—
1900	1,378		—
1910	1,530		11.0%
1920	1,709		11.7%
1930	1,890		10.6%
1940	2,030		7.4%
1950	1,723		−15.1%
1960	1,392		−19.2%
1970	1,274		−8.5%
1980	1,078		−15.4%
1990	985		−8.6%
2000	968		−1.7%
2010	869		−10.2%
2020	897		3.2%

=== 2000 census ===
As of the U.S. Census Bureau, there were 968 people, 404 households, and 258 families in the borough. The population density was 3752/sqmi (1449/km^{2}). There were 458 housing units at an average density of 1775/sqmi (685/km^{2}). The racial makeup of the borough was 99.38% White, 0.10% Native American, 0.21% Asian, 0.21% from other races, and 0.10% from two or more races. Hispanic or Latino people of any race were 1.24% of the population.

There were 404 households, out of which 24.8% had children under the age of 18 living with them, 46.0% were married couples living together, 10.4% had a female householder with no husband present, and 36.1% were non-families. 33.2% of all households were made up of individuals, and 17.1% had someone living alone who was 65 years of age or older. The average household size was 2.39 and the average family size was 3.04.

The borough population contained 22.3% under the age of 18, 6.6% from 18 to 24, 28.8% from 25 to 44, 20.0% from 45 to 64, and 22.2% who were 65 years of age or older. The median age was 40 years. For every 100 females there were 100.4 males. For every 100 females age 18 and over, there were 102.7 males.

The median income for a household in the borough was $31,058, and the median income for a family was $42,500. Males had a median income of $30,000 versus $20,417 for females. The per capita income for the borough was $17,296. About 4.4% of families and 7.6% of the population were below the poverty line, including 6.0% of those under age 18 and 15.6% of those age 65 or over.

== Transportation ==
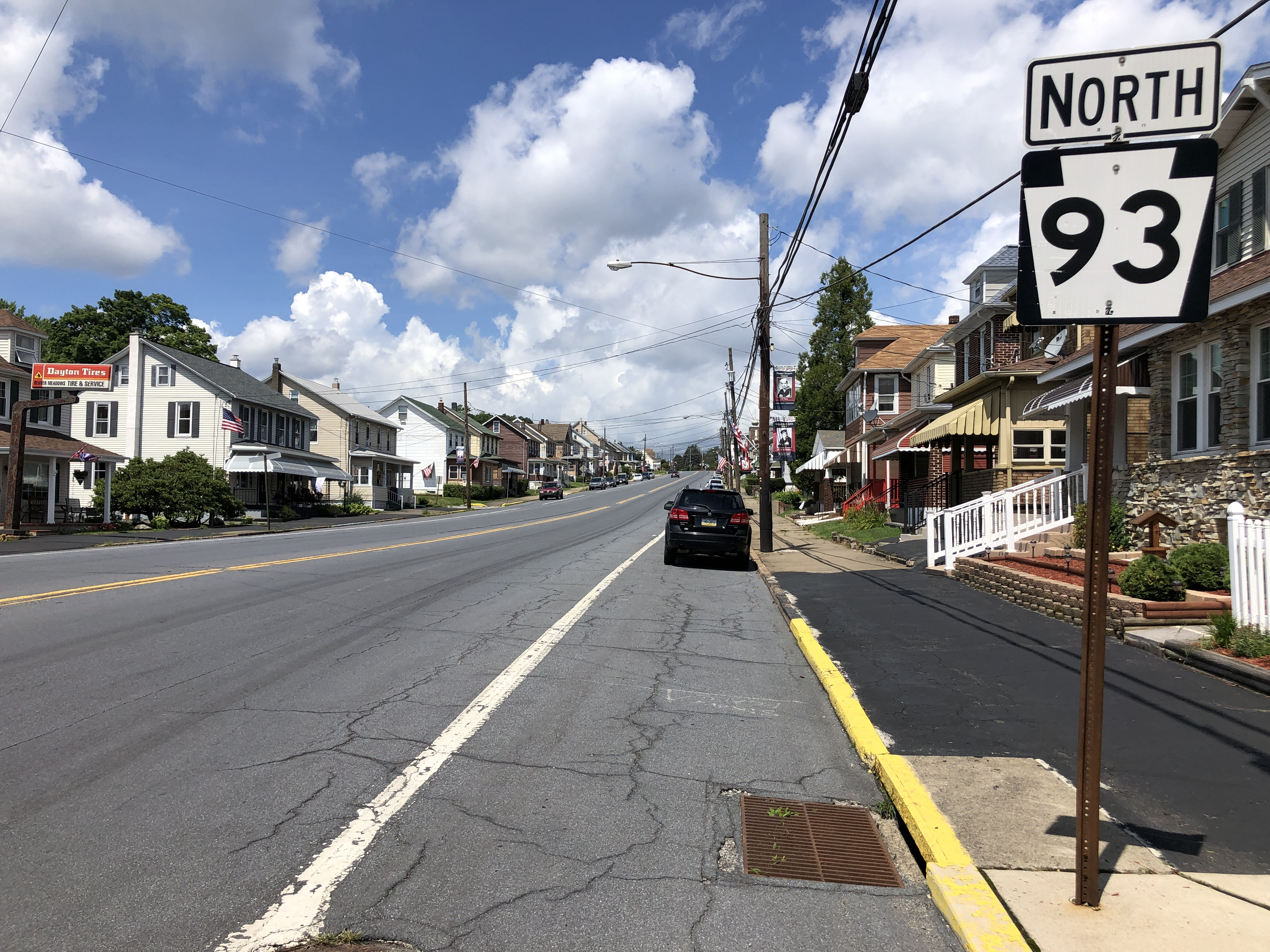
PA Route 93 northbound in Beaver Meadows

As of 2013, there were 3.63 miles (5.84 km) of public roads in Beaver Meadows, of which 1.03 miles (1.66 km) were maintained by the Pennsylvania Department of Transportation (PennDOT) and 2.60 miles (4.18 km) were maintained by the borough.

Pennsylvania Route 93 is the only numbered highway serving Beaver Meadows. It follows Berwick Street and Broad Street along a northwest–southeast alignment through the western and southern portions of the borough.

== Education ==
Beaver Meadows is in the Hazleton Area School District. The zoned public high school is Hazleton Area High School in Hazle Township.

== Notable people ==
- Norm Larker, former professional baseball player
