= Lausanne Landing, Pennsylvania =

Settlement in Pennsylvania, United States

Coordinates: 40°52′28.17″N 75°45′34.86″W

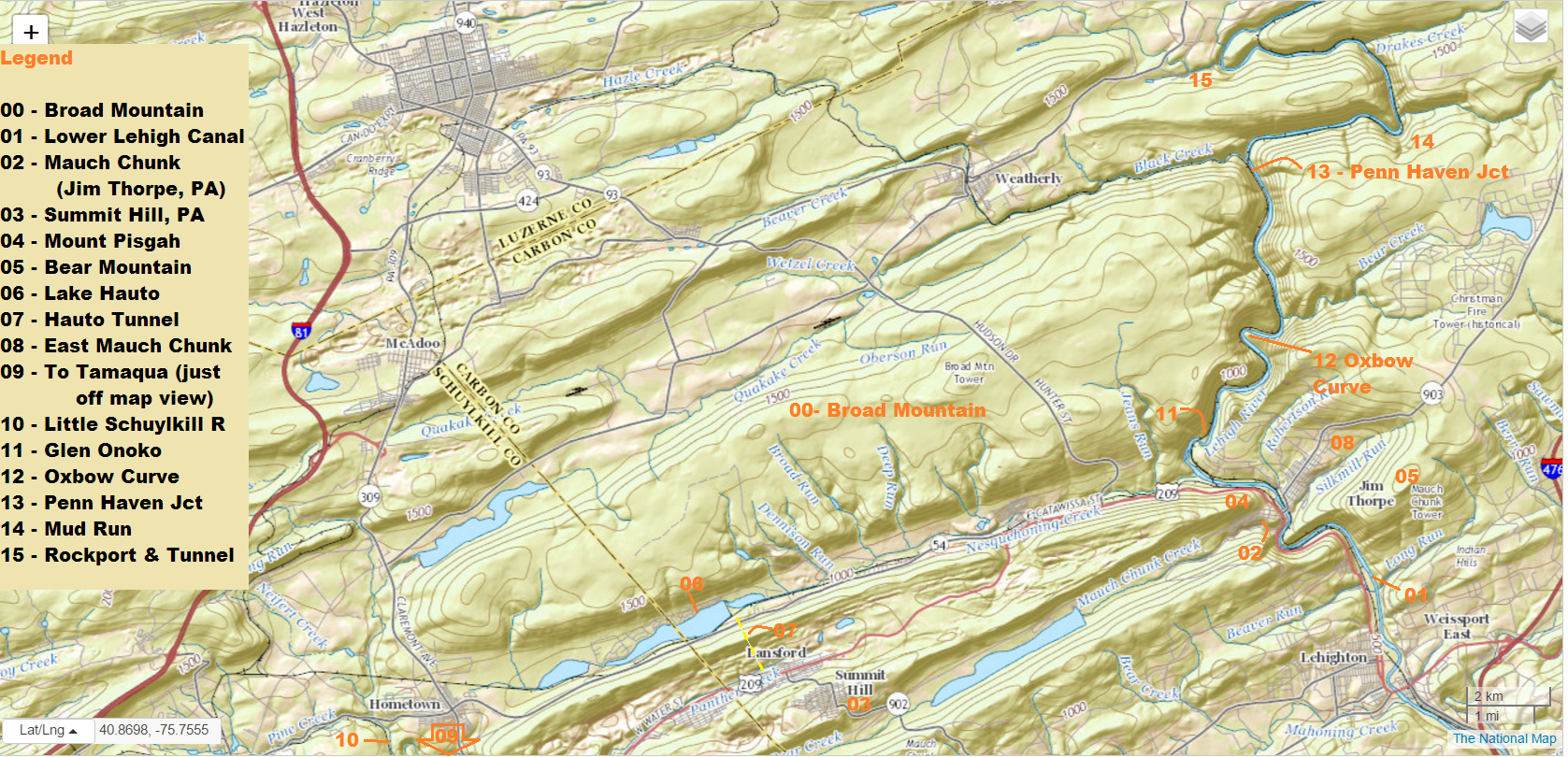
A map of the northwestern region of Carbon County in Northeastern Pennsylvania

Lausanne Landing, Pennsylvania was a small settlement at the mouth of Nesquehoning Creek on the Lehigh River. Some historic references will mention the presence of a Landing Tavern as the entirety of the town. Lausanne Township was originally organized out of dense wilderness along an ancient Amerindian Trail, the Warriors' Path, an important regional route as it connected the Susquehanna River settlements of the lower Wyoming Valley to those around Philadelphia.

During the American Revolutionary War, this route became the Lausanne-Nescopeck Road. In 1804, it was improved into a toll road, the Lehigh and Susquehanna Turnpike. The fan-shaped plain provided some of the flattest landscape terrain in the entire area, and was able to support a few small farm plots, boat building, and a lumber mill.

As the U.S. economy became industrialized, widespread local deforestation occurred to feed lumber mills and craft transports. Exacerbating local clearcutting was convenient river access. The Lehigh River could support river arks. The Nesquehoning Creek mouth issues behind a small river island and sits above the long curved lake-like upper pool of the Lehigh below the outlet of the gorge, and its delta's smoothly sloped sides made an attractive landing beach, giving name to the inn. With the popularity of the route and the roughness of the country, often called "The Switzerland of America" the location was a natural rest stop for the next leg to the north involved a steep climb and was over nine miles to the area of Beaver Meadows. Following that, "Landing Tavern" was added to its nicknames.

At that time, all of Northampton north of the Blue Mountains was known as the Towamensing District, "Towamensing" being an Indian word for "wilderness".

— Jack Sterling, Ancestry.com's Carbon County Boroughs and Townships

It was used initially by transient work crews timbering and building temporary river boats to haul cargo known as arks, a common solution to ship upstream resources out of the frontier. As such early on it anchored a sawmill, tavern, crude housing, tool and work sheds, and in 1804–05, a toll house built for the Lehigh and Susquehanna turnpike, climbing the nearby ravine of Jean's Run as it began the sharp ascent up Broad Mountain to pass in succession along the banks of the Black Creek, Quakake Creek, Beaver Creek valleys in (the future) Carbon County, Pennsylvania then climb Hazel Creek into Luzerne County up to the flat area of the Mountain pass, a marshy saddle, which became Hazleton near the 1780s settlement of St John's along the descent to Nescopeck on the Susquehanna River, PA Route 93 follows much of the same road bed, save for starting at an elevated altitude from the nearby town of Nesquehoning via a high level bridge.

The Moravians had been following the "Warriors' Path" used by the Delaware and Seneca tribes since 1742, when Count Nicholas Lewis von Zinzendorf, the missionary who founded Bethlehem, used the trail. The path widened as missionaries traveled through what is now Hazleton on their way to Berwick and the Wyoming Valley along the Susquehanna River.

The first step toward developing a town came in 1804 when a private company built the Berwick Turnpike along the old Indian trail in an effort to open a way to the lumber lands along the upper reaches of the Susquehanna.

— Carl Christopher, Pages From the Past, the Standard-Speaker's 125th anniversary edition

== Old Lausanne Township ==
Following the end of the American Revolutionary War, the rough steep banks of the Lehigh Valley area above the Lehigh Gap in the Blue Mountain Ridge were virtually unoccupied, the Amerindians even called the area "Towamensing", literally meaning "The Wilderness", though their summer foraging parties regularly traveled its trails. Even the largest city to the north, Hazleton, Pennsylvania, was then a saddle that wouldn't be occupied until anthracite drew in settlers, save for a few reclusive hunters. The Amerindian Trail over the barrier ridge of Broad Mountain known as the Warriors Trail, which is now roughly PA Route 93, after becoming the Lehigh and Susquehanna Turnpike in 1804.) was known, and re-branded the Lausanne-Nescopeck Road when settlers did enter the area. With little flat terrain, the soil was essentially unfarmable, so the only obvious industry before people learned the tricks of burning hard to sustain and ignite anthracite was timber, which Brenckman claims drove the company that formed the turnpike – and the Lehigh is a shallow river, making harvest of big logs and especially their transport, very difficult. Having a wagon road with sledges in winter lands covered in snow make the impossible merely difficult. Once on the river, such logs can be rafted on the spring freshets, as floods were called in the day.

The historic name Lausanne Township, prior to the 1808 reshuffling, based on Pennsylvania's township rules of local government defined in the Pennsylvania Constitution, applied for all the territory north of the Lehigh Gap to the Luzerne County line in the Federalist-era's much larger Northampton County, the whole frontier region above the Lehigh Gap from around 1790 to 1808, and to 1827, when present-day Jim Thorpe was split off. It is removed in time and repeated reorganizations of local government entities from the rump bit of land that is today's Lausanne Township, which is still along the County Line, and but the remains of the old township's size-wise, located along the extreme northern border of Carbon County, Pennsylvania.

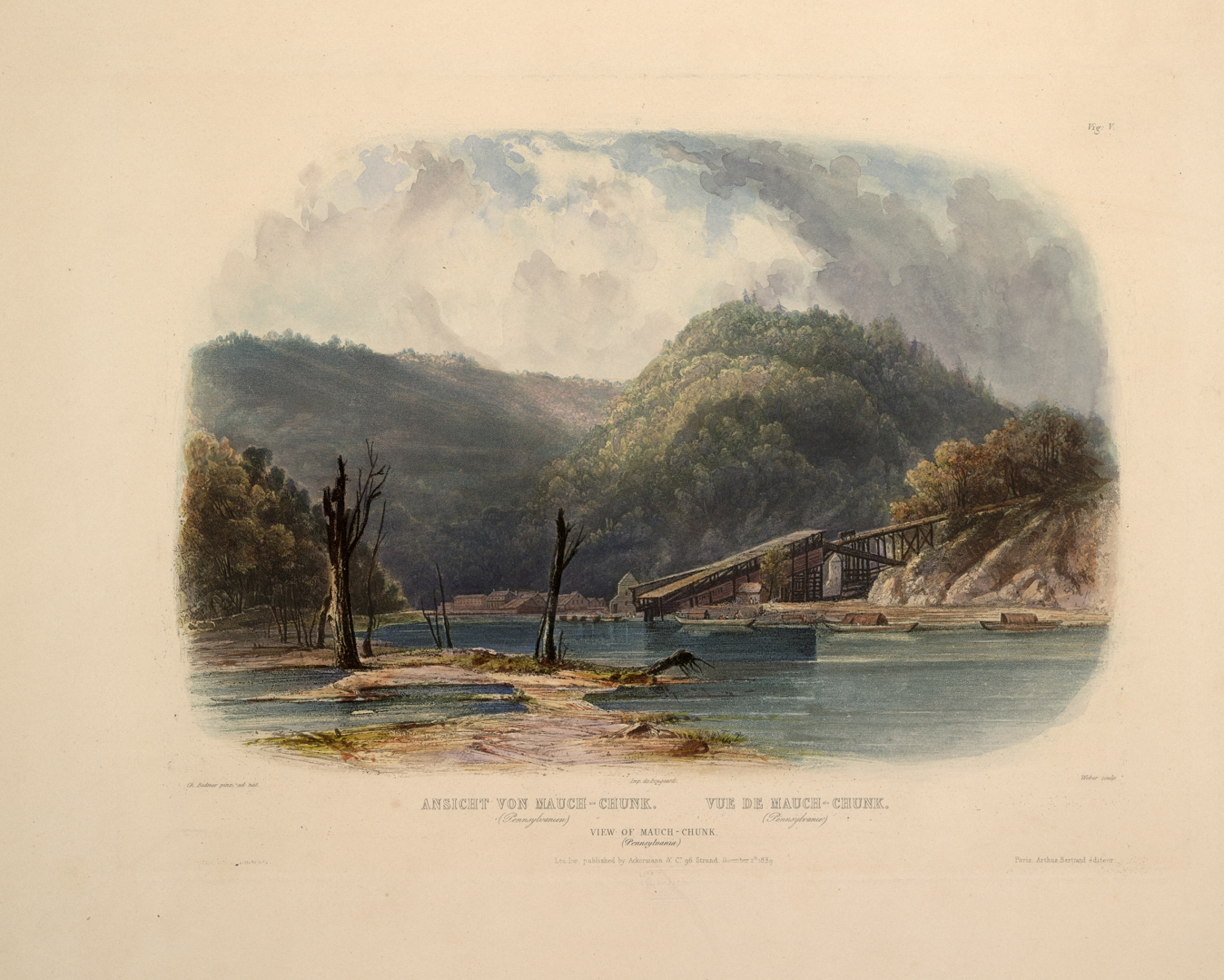
From Karl Bodmer's 1832 Travels in America collection of engravings—a view from Bear Mountain at the outlet of the Lehigh Gorge opposite the Nesquehoning Creek and lost town of Lausanne Landing; the first coal chute and coal loading docks at the terminus of the Summit Hill and Mauch Chunk Railroad viewed diagonally across the lakelike slack water pool above the Lehigh's Mauch Chunk Dam from the lightly settled shores of East Mauch Chunk (Note: Karl Bodner's Painting of Mauch Chunk's coal chute—The chute drops 200' from a shelf on Mount Pisgah, today called "Upper Jim Thorpe" (North Ave. area)—the end of the gravity railroad coming nine miles from Summit Hill.) In the foreground, is the long slack water pool above the Lower Lehigh Canal enhanced by the LC&N Co.'s upper lock and first dam at the turn below Mauch Chunk. Painting is fourteen years after the LCC and LNC were formally incorporated, probably while the Beaver Meadow Railroad was under construction. This painting shows the view (Note: The view from East Mauch Chunk near the foot of the Lehigh Gorge was likely from the trail where the LC&N backed Beaver Meadows Railroad would not much later construct its tracks from Beaver Meadows, Weatherly and Penn Haven Junction at the confluence of the upper Lehigh and the Black Creek to reach the Lehigh Canal.) from East Mauch Chunk near the foot of the Lehigh Gorge, across the mile-plus-long slack water pool to the loading docks below Mount Pisgah. Its primitive company town, Mauch Chunk, now Jim Thorpe, Pennsylvania, sits in the shelf-land and gap under Mount Pisgah. By the time of the painting, Landing Tavern and the Lausanne toll house would have been part of Mauch Chunk Township, and Lausanne Township would have continued, but its center would have been displaced northwards to retain other lightly populated wards and precincts outside the new towns.

Today there are only a few stone ruins at the site of the ephemeral community mentioned by 19th century historians as Lausanne Landing, Lausanne, and Lausanne Township, (Note: The "Lausanne Township" name oft-mentioned by historians of Pennsylvania, Northampton County, and Carbon County were based on the local government entity (name) as defined by the Pennsylvania Constitution for the whole frontier region above the Lehigh Gap from around 1790 into the 1820s—the township in its earliest incarnation (1808–1827) contained all of the lands in Northampton County that would become the parts of Carbon County west of the Lehigh River. That township for most of its lifespan would have only a relative few widely scattered settlements and end up spawning communities that themselves spawned others as others moved into the developing frontier region, gathered enough voters into wards and precincts, then executed home rule petitions to form new townships such as East Penn, Mauch Chunk, East Mauch Chunk, Summit Hill, and various communities north of Broad Mountain and west of the Lehigh in Carbon County such as Beaver Meadows, Weatherly, and White Haven.) each signifying a frontier settlement which was a community occupied for most of three decades by a few permanent pioneers, but mainly by transient work crews, either building one way cargo boats, cutting down trees, or mining coal.

Tucked between Weatherly and Jim Thorpe lies the lost town of Lausanne Landing. Some may know of Lausanne Township, which was created in 1808 when Penn Township was divided into East Penn, West Penn and Lausanne. At one time, Lausanne Township contained Rockport, Weatherly, Clifton, Penn Haven and Buck Mountain. The township became smaller and smaller as portions of it were set off for Mauch Chunk in 1827, Banks in 1842, Packer in 1847 and Weatherly in 1863. The largest portion was relinquished to Lehigh Township in 1875.

Now the township is six miles in length and 2½ miles in breadth.

— Amanda J. Treible, Times News, Saturday, November 5, 2016

The Lehigh & Susquehanna Turnpike's buildings were erected alongside Landing Tavern, which was erected along the Amerindian trail head of the mostly unimproved footpath between Lausanne and Nescopeck, before it ascended Broad Mountain and before it was acquired by investors and chartered (1804) as a toll road. These buildings and others such as storehouses, a saw mill and the turnpike toll house were all located near the "Delta" of the Nesquehoning, the wide shallow slopes in the flood-prone mouth terrain (Note: The area today is occupied by a small switching yard that can be seen below U.S. Route 209 as it makes the sharp turn into the Nesquehoning Creek valley about a mile below the town of Nesquehoning, and about the same distance upriver from the Pennsylvania Route 903 bridge from the Jim Thorpe business district to the East Jim Thorpe neighborhoods of the borough.) at the confluence of the Lehigh River coming westwards out of the Lehigh Gorge and the east flowing Nesquehoning Creek flowing down its steep sided deep ravine into the head end of the calm slack water lake running southwards at right angles to both from their merge.

Pioneering penetrations of mountainous terrain were spearheaded by traders and subsistence hunters gradually exploring the frontier with or without an Amerindian guide. Either of which were often followed by lumbermen harvesting the riches of the forest, the structural material which Lewis Mumford in his seminal study of the interrelationships between technology and societal development, Technics and Civilization noted:

The rational conquest of the environment by means of machines is fundamentally the work of the woodsman. In part, the explanation of his [mans] success is can be discovered in terms of the material he uses. For wood, beyond any other natural material, lends itself to manipulation: right down to the nineteenth century it had a place in civilization that the metals themselves were to assume only after that point.

— Lewis Mumford, Technics and Civilization, 1963 ed.

Because of the valley's collision between warring ridgelines above the Lehigh's water gap where Broad Mountain, Nesquehoning Mountain, Pisgah Ridge, and Mauch Chunk Mountain all funnel waters into the long slack water pool where the Lehigh is slow and broad and lakelike under the shadow of the west face of Bear Mountain.
