= Broad Mountain =

Broad Mountain may refer to:

- Broad Mountain (Lehigh Valley), a barrier ridge in Carbon County and Schuylkill County, Pennsylvania, U.S.
- Broad Mountain in Grundy County, Tennessee, U.S.
- Broad Mountain in Kerr County, Texas, U.S.
