= Room Run Railroad =

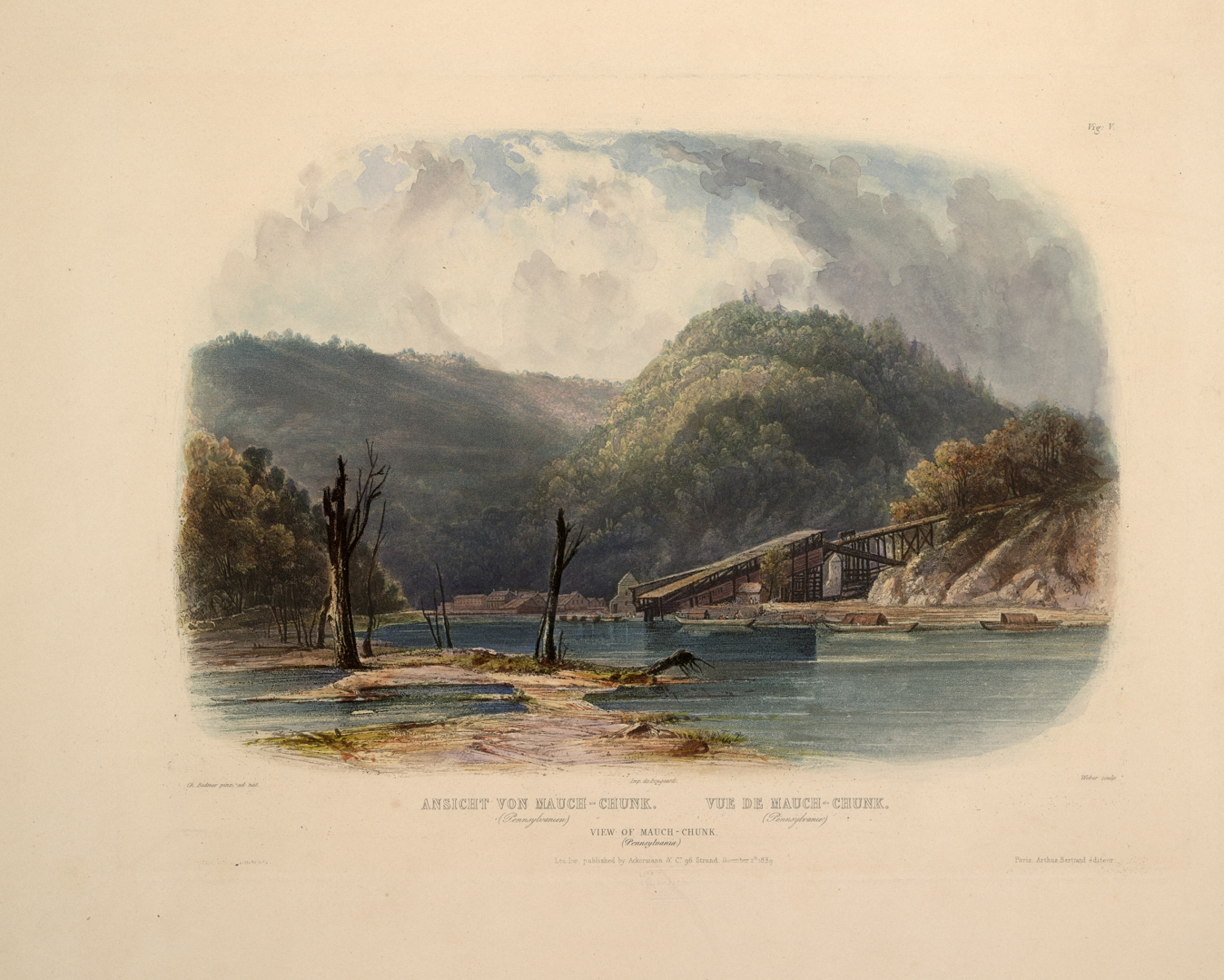
The Lehigh River at Nesquehoning Creek and Lausanne Township in Northeastern Pennsylvania; coal was delivered into wharves located in Mauch Chunk in present-day Jim Thorpe.

The Room (or Rhume) Run Railroad was an early American gravity railroad with self-acting planes. It was built by the Lehigh Coal and Navigation Company to transport coal from the Room Run Mine in Nesquehoning, Pennsylvania to landings at Mauch Chunk on the Lehigh River so it could be shipped on the Lehigh Canal to the Delaware River at Easton, Pennsylvania to markets in Philadelphia or New York City via the Delaware or Morris Canals.

== History ==
In 1806, coal was being mined at the Room Run Mine and in one instance was shipped to Philadelphia from Lausanne Township, Pennsylvania, located at the confluence of the Nesquehoning Creek and the Lehigh River about one-mile upstream from Mauch Chunk in present-day Jim Thorpe, Pennsylvania. The Room Run mine was located about 4 miles (6.4 km) from Lausanne making the transport of the coal extracted there much easier from this location to the landing. No other alternative was available at that time to transport the coal except to move it to Summit Hill, Pennsylvania by wagon, and from there to another wagon trail to Mauch Chunk, which would triple the transport time with no less difficulty in travel.

In 1814, Room Run coal was shipped to a mill owned by Josiah White and Erskine Hazard at the falls of the Schuylkill River in Philadelphia. White and Hazard became investors in the Lehigh Coal Mining Company, eventually becoming part of its successor companies’ management.

While White was acting manager of the Lehigh Coal & Navigation Company in 1830, he convinced his board to develop the Room Run Mine to increase production substantially adding to Lehigh’s other mine in the area at Summit Hill. White also determined that coal closer to the Lehigh River at Room Run Mine could be more economical since it had its own railroad to deliver coal to Lausanne, rather than transporting it to Summit Hill and then shipping it over the new existing gravity railway in use there. The work was authorized in late 1830.

Construction of the project began in 1831. Work was suspended later that year to wait for some work on the Delaware and Morris Canals to be completed. Work resumed in May 1832 and the railroad was completed in 1833. In 1833, over 21,000 tons of anthracite coal was transported over the just completed railroad.

The railroad had three self-acting planes in which loaded wagons going down pull, via a cable and drum, the empty wagons going up. Two of these planes were located at the railroad’s entrance from Room Run, a small creek, into the narrow Nesquehoning Valley. The third was located at the descent to the Lehigh River elevation before the short track to the landing. The coal was delivered into wharves located at the Mauch Chunk Pond within the town and not to Lausanne. The balance of the railroad was animal (mule) operated. The majority of the railroad, was single tracked, except for the inclined planes which were double tracked. The route followed much the same route of the present U.S. Route 209 between Nesquehoning and Jim Thorpe.

Unlike the Summit Hill, Mauch Chunk Switchback Railroad had a stationary steam engine. The Room Run Railroad relied solely on mule power to retrieve the empty cars from Mauch Chunk. Special cars allowed the mules to ride downhill before beginning the trip back to Nesquehoning and the climb up the plane to the mines. To the east, and close to the Lehigh River, the descent is very steep.

The wooden rails for the gravity route were made of oak, and attached to iron knees by spikes. Strap-iron rail was laid along the inside edge of the oak rails. The iron rails were beveled at the ends for better continuity between sections.

During operation of the planes, the looped ropes especially on the steep plane, made from either hemp or iron chain, were subject to significant wear. In 1838, the Lehigh Company replaced this rope with an iron band one-twelfth of an inch thick but three inches wide. This improvement proved successful and the change was made to the other two inclined planes, which saved replacement and downtime costs.

The Room Run Gravity Railroad was replaced by the Nesquehoning Valley Railroad. A new main line was completed in April 1870 along with the Hauto Tunnel through Nesquehoning Mountain to coal yards in Lansford, Pennsylvania, and the rest of the Panther Creek Valley was completed in 1872 as a joint-effort of the CNJ and Lehigh. CNJ operated the new railroad as a lease of the Lehigh Company.

== See also ==
- Anthracite
- Lausanne Landing, Pennsylvania
- Nesquehoning Creek
- Nesquehoning, Pennsylvania
- Oldest railroads in North America
- Pisgah Mountain
