= Township (Pennsylvania) =

Lowest level municipal corporation in Pennsylvania

Map of all Pennsylvania municipal borders (township, borough, city etc)

Map of the United States with Pennsylvania highlighted

A township, under the laws of the Commonwealth of Pennsylvania, is the lowest level of municipal incorporation of government. All of Pennsylvania's communities outside of incorporated cities, boroughs, and one town have been incorporated into individual townships that serve as the legal entities providing local self-government functions.

In general, townships in Pennsylvania encompass larger land areas than other municipalities, and tend to be located in suburban, exurban, or rural parts of the commonwealth. As with other incorporated municipalities in Pennsylvania, townships exist within counties and are subordinate to or dependent upon the county level of government.

== History ==
Townships in Pennsylvania were created in the 17th century during the colonial-era Province of Pennsylvania prior to the American Revolution. Much of the province was then occupied by Native Americans, but the colonial administration in Philadelphia brought new counties and new settlements regularly.

The first communities defined by the provincial state government tended to be rural, geographically large, and sparsely populated townships. (Note: The township of Lausanne in Carbon County, for instance, was defined in 1808, when it encompassed virtually all the homesteader settlements in Carbon County north of the Lehigh Gap (i.e. lands north of Lehighton and Weiss Landing—on opposite banks of the River below the barrier ridge. The hamlet of Lausanne Landing anchored one end of the Lausanne-Nescopeck Turnpike, an important early road connecting Philadelphia to Wilkes-Barre and cutting off over 100 miles over the trip west to Harrisburg then north up the Susquehanna—As the 19th-century progressed, one township after another split off as local industry and real estate allowed populations to coalesce into local towns. As the process progressed, Lausanne Township grew smaller and smaller in each case being dislocated again into a more rural center until the remnant which had once been nearly the whole county, was a small rectangular strip between two ridge lines.)

Townships or portions of them tended to become boroughs after population growth or an increase in population density and, eventually, might to reincorporate at the level of city. Initially, each municipal organization begins as a second-class township. When a sufficient population density, currently 300 people per square mile, was attained, the township had the option of holding a referendum and, if it passed, became a first-class township. The municipality could proceed to the level of borough or city in a similar fashion. Historically, this progression has often included border adjustments or mergers with other boroughs or townships. Many communities remain townships in spite of growth that brings the characteristics of more-urbanized areas that might be associated with "towns." (Note: more-urbanized developments —e.g. apartment houses, office buildings, large shopping centers, dense and busy down town streets with a lot of traffic signals.)

Because Pennsylvania's constitution provides for a progression of municipal structures based on population growth, it is not uncommon to have a township and borough of the same or similar name, generally adjacent within the same county. The 'town-like' borough might be partially or wholly surrounded by the remaining township from which it had split off.

The government of Cold Spring Township ceased to function in 1961, when there were no candidates for office.

== Function ==
Pennsylvania townships typically vary in size from 6 to 40 square miles (16–104 km^{2}). There are two classifications of townships, first class and second class. The commonwealth initially incorporates all townships as second class townships. To become a township of the first class and operate under the powers of the First Class Township Code, a township must have a population density of 300 inhabitants per square mile (120/km^{2}) and voters therein must approve the change of classification in a referendum.

The classes of townships differ primarily in the form of their administration. Townships of the second class are governed by a board of supervisors, elected at large by the electorate of the whole township for overlapping six-year terms. The number of supervisors can be increased to five by referendum. Townships of the first class, by contrast, have a board of commissioners. Between five and fifteen commissioners sit on this panel; they can be elected either at large or by wards within the township; and they serve for overlapping terms of four years in office. Other elected officials include a tax collector and, in many townships, a panel of three auditors who annually audit all township accounts. The supervisors or commissioners of the township appoint a secretary and a treasurer, and may also appoint a township manager to coordinate township employees and operations.

County governments may provide some or all municipal services to residents of townships, regardless of class and size, including trash collection or sewage processing. Some counties, though, leave individual municipalities to provide their own services; in some instances small groups of boroughs or townships may pool their resources to provide water, police, or other functions. The main areas of local services include police and fire protection, maintenance of local roads and streets, water supply, sewage collection and treatment, parking and traffic control, local planning and zoning, parks and recreation, garbage collection, health services, libraries, licensing of businesses and code enforcement. All municipalities in Pennsylvania, however, rely on county and state organized courts for probate, criminal, and civil court services.

== Home rule hierarchy ==
Under the Pennsylvania constitution, each governmental entity has the right to choose its own form of self-government, and a limited ability to delegate powers and oversight to such entities as authorities, commissions and school boards. Any township, regardless of its class, may adopt a home rule charter, at which point it is no longer governed by the Pennsylvania Township Codes. While a home rule charter can incorporate unusual features, standard municipal functions are generally part of the mix regardless of how offices and powers are allocated within the jurisdiction.

== See also ==
- Civil township
- List of cities in Pennsylvania
- List of places in Pennsylvania
- List of towns and boroughs in Pennsylvania
- List of townships in Pennsylvania
