= Black Creek (Lehigh River tributary) =

Tributary of the Lehigh River in Carbon County, Pennsylvania

Coordinates: 40°56′43″N 75°44′48″W

Black Creek is a 7.6-mile-long (12.2 km) brook tributary of the Lehigh River in Carbon County, Pennsylvania, in the United States,. Its waters start at the very south edge of Weatherly, Pennsylvania at the confluence of Beaver and Hazle Creeks, then runs nearly due east to its mouth on the Lehigh River in Maple Hollow at the former railroad depot of Penn Haven Junction just east of Hinkles Valley. The confluence was a waypoint along the 19th-century Lehigh & Susquehanna Turnpike (Note: The Lausanne-Nescopeck Turnpike leg was part of a larger Lehigh and Susquehanna road network connecting Philadelphia to the southern Wyoming Valley, as its north-northwestwards course descended the barrier ridge, Broad Mountain to follow along Beaver Creek on its way to the mountain pass leading to Hazelton, PA and the Susquehanna River opposite Shickshinny, PA.) Black Creek has two major tributaries joining within Weatherly, the 7 miles (11 km) long Beaver Creek (Carbon County) The tributary Quakake Creek, is the more dispersed and disorganized source waters, originating in over half-a-dozen small streams; it is also listed by the Geographic Names Information System (GNIS) as a variant name for Black Creek.

Black Creek was named because of the because of the dark background pigment in the water created by anthracite coal, but this was a later development as its confluence origin and main course easterly became far more important hosting Railroad trackage than the Turnpike ever hoped to become. Historically, Black Creek was also known as Hazel Creek, stemming from the hazelnut trees that grew alongside its banks, though that name in the present-day is given a tributary of Beaver Creek closer to Beaver Meadows, PA. (Note: Since the streambeds are masked by the town buildings within modern Weatherly, the upper reaches of the creek passing through Weatherly are also sometimes referred to by locals as 'Hazel Creek', but are in fact, officially Beaver Creek, which bi-sects the towns streets in its north to south jog—the Hazel Creek is a bit upstream from there generating the confusion in names.)

Black Creek, Beaver Creek and Weatherly are all historically related to the Beaver Meadow Railroad, an 1830 predecessor railway to (purchased in 1855 by the newly formed) Lehigh Valley Railroad corporation (LV or LVRR), which grew to be a famous Class I railway. (Note: The Beaver Meadow Railroad was the first North American to use steam locomotives as the prime mover providing tractive effort. The Delaware & Hudson Canal's Railway imported four engines several years before, but found they were too heavy to run on their light tracks—track laying and configurations were themselves each an emerging technology in the 1830s.) The banks-side footpath from the Lehigh River at the 19th century settlement of Lausanne Landing climbed the steep south slopes of Broad Mountain and followed a chain of watercourses to Nescopeck opposite Shickshinny, PA on the main Susquehanna branch. Initially, in 1830, the Beaver Meadow mining operations sent coal out by pack mules, but then capitalized the railway, when the technology was emergent and untried. Consequently, the creek hosted the first operating steam locomotives employed as mobile traction engines in the United States. (Note: The Delaware and Hudson purchased the first steam locos for their trackage between the Delaware and the Coaldale, PA mines above Scranton, but finding they were too heavy, used them as fixed engines operating the cable winches in the cable railway parts of the system.)

Black Creek joins the Lehigh River near the community of Rockport, the closest occupied place to Penn Haven Junction in the midst of the rough terrain of the Lehigh River Gorge.

== See also ==
- List of rivers of Pennsylvania
