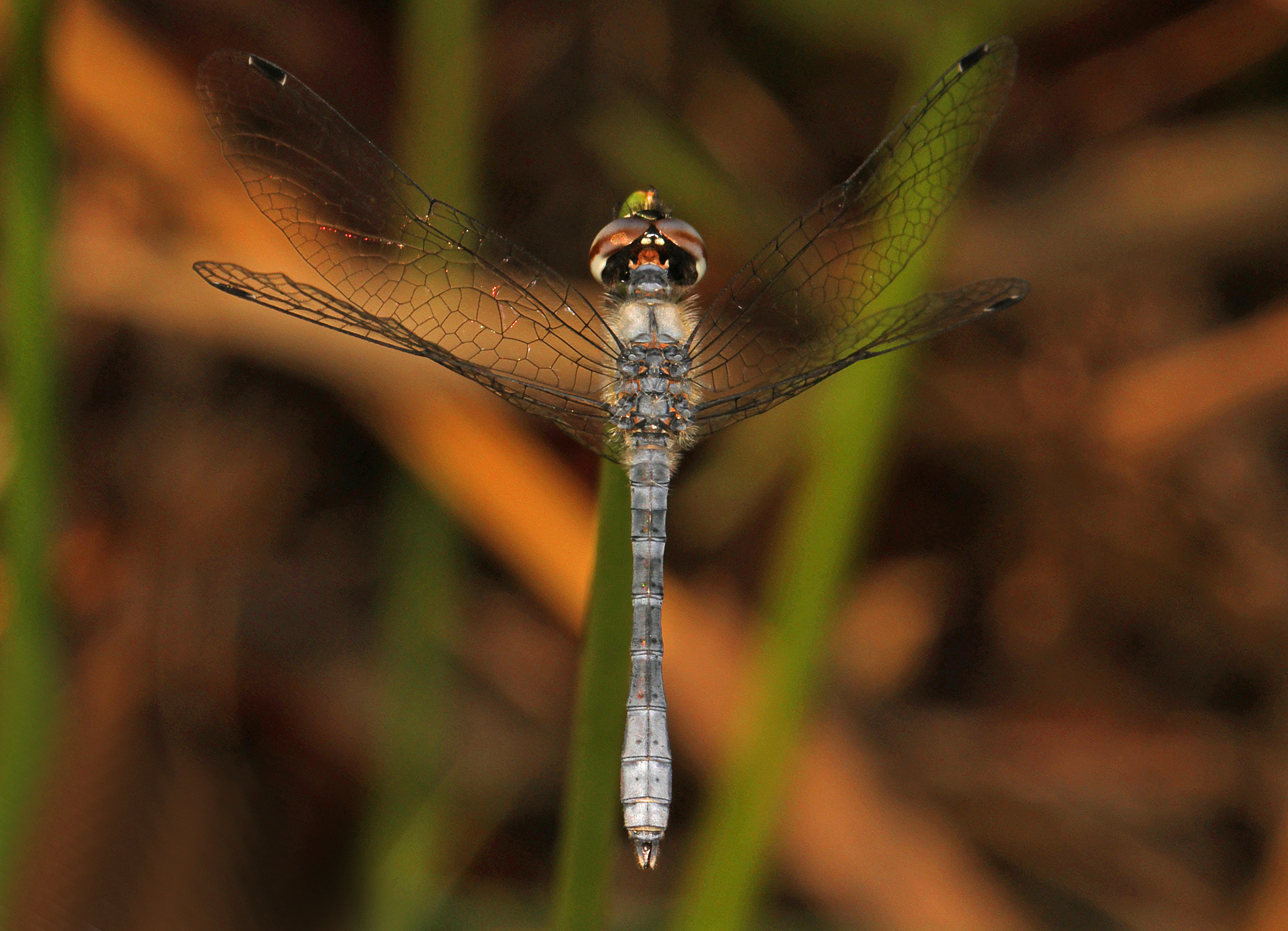
- Male

Scientific classification
- Kingdom: Animalia
- Phylum: Arthropoda
- Clade: Pancrustacea
- Class: Insecta
- Order: Odonata
- Infraorder: Anisoptera
- Superfamily: Libelluloidea
- Family: Libellulidae
- Subfamily: Brachydiplacinae
- Genus: Nannothemis; Brauer, 1868
- Species: N. bella

Binomial name
- Nannothemis bella (Uhler, 1857)

= Nannothemis =

Nannothemis bella

Genus of dragonflies

Nannothemis is a genus of dragonflies in the family Libellulidae. It is monotypic, being represented by the single species, Nannothemis bella, commonly known as the elfin skimmer. The elfin skimmer is native to the eastern United States and Canada, and is the smallest dragonfly in North America. Males are powdery blue, while females are black and yellow, resembling a wasp.

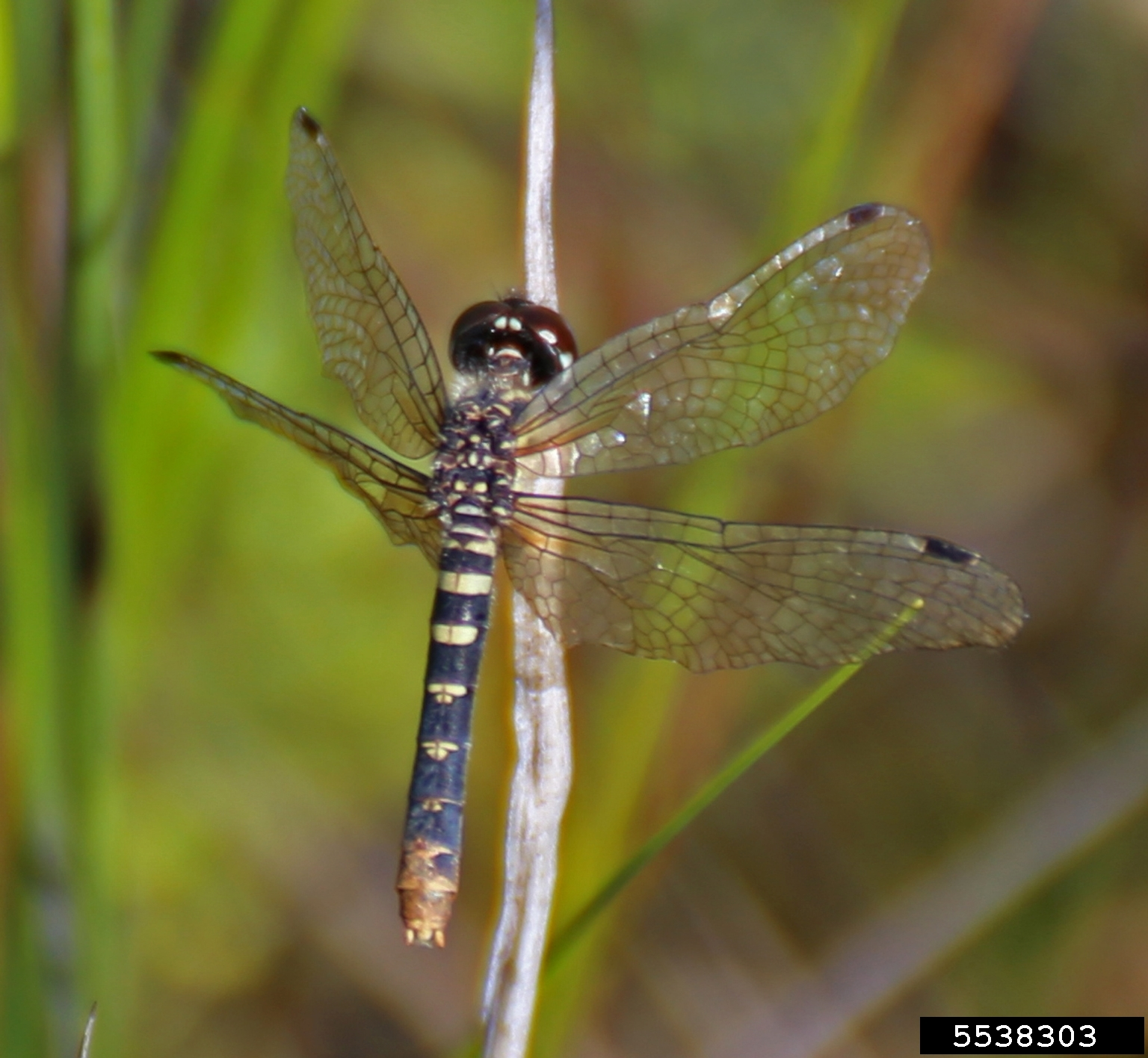
Nannothemis bella, female
