= Beaver Creek (Lehigh River tributary) =

Beaver Creek, Carbon County, Pennsylvania
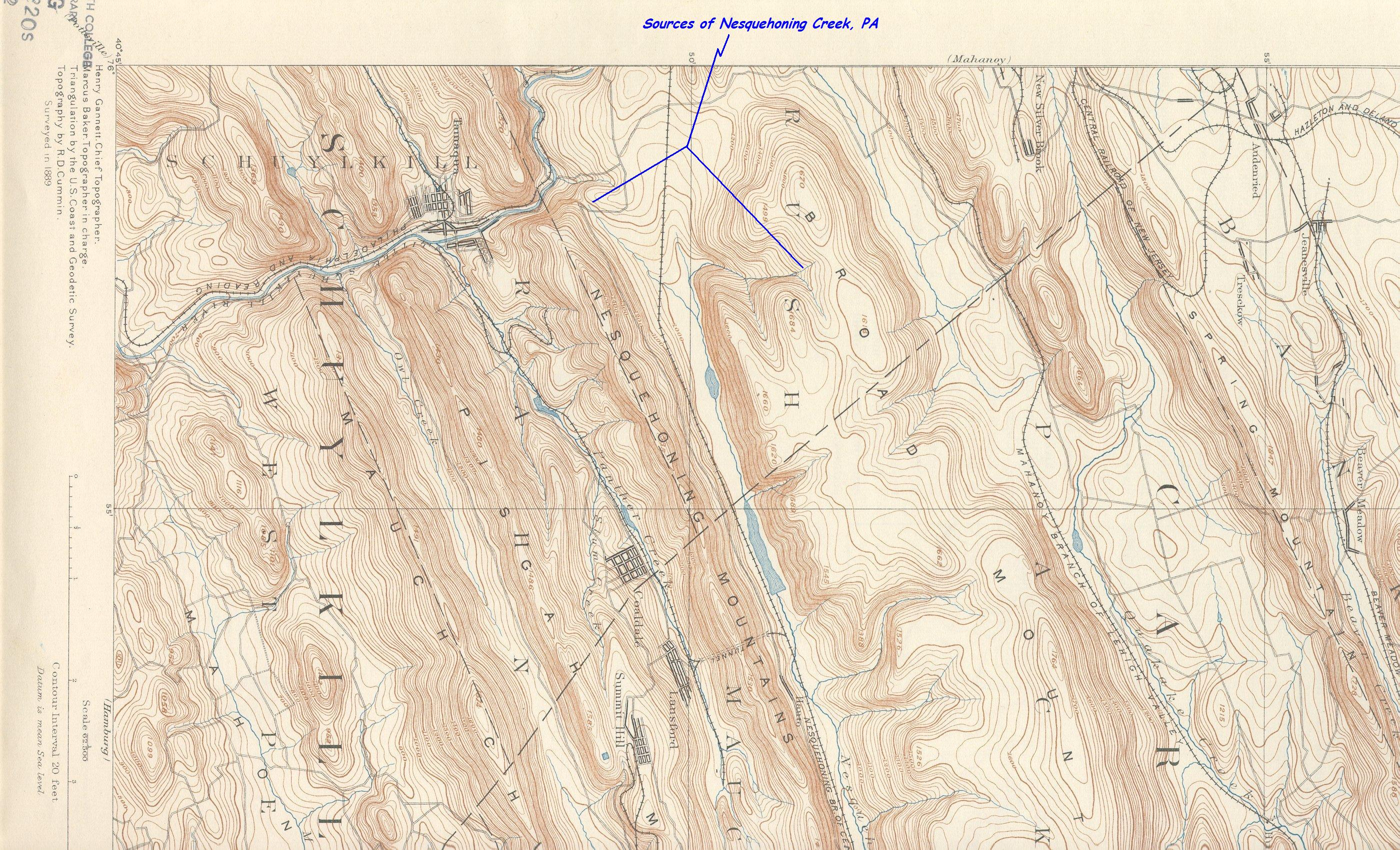

Physical characteristics
- Source
  - location: Highest of two: on south face Broad Mountain above Hometown, Pennsylvania
  - coordinates: 40.85°N 75.975°W
  - elevation: 1,360 feet (415 m)
- Mouth
  - location: Lehigh River between Jim Thorpe and Nesquehoning, Pennsylvania
  - coordinates: 40°52′32″N 75°45′41″W
- Length: 14.9 mi (24.0 km)

Beaver Creek in Carbon County, Pennsylvania is an east-to-west-running tributary of the Lehigh River giving name to and draining the southern terrains of Beaver Meadows into Black Creek.

The creek rises 1,500 feet (460 m) southeast of the intersection of Main Street and Lincoln Circle in Junedale, one unincorporated village (neighborhood) of Banks Township at the northwestern corner of Carbon County, Pennsylvania, and runs nearly due east-northeast through the center of Beaver Meadows, Pennsylvania 5.74 miles (9.24 km) to the centerline of Weatherly, where it turns abruptly and runs due south 1.25 miles through the center of Weatherly, where, 7.0 miles (11.3 km) from its source, it merges with Hazle Creek, thereby forming Black Creek, Pennsylvania, which turns abruptly east from its origin.

== History ==
The streams played a large role in the development of the Province of Pennsylvania as a turnpike was constructed from Lausanne (Note: Lausanne was a 19th-century township which included the Lehigh's exit from the Lehigh River Gorge opposite the mouth of Nesquehoning Creek about two miles above Jim Thorpe, Pennsylvania.) along Black Creek and Beaver Creek, north from Beaver Meadows, Pennsylvania to the Susquehanna River, and the developing Industrializing United States, as a 19th-century transportation corridor hosting the Beaver Meadows Railroad connecting Beaver Meadows via Weatherly and Penn Haven Junction to the Lehigh Canal.

== See also ==
- List of rivers of Pennsylvania
