= Quakake Creek =

Coordinates: 40.88671°N 75.99188°W

Quakake Creek (pronounced QWAY-kake) is a 12.0-mile-long (19.3 km) tributary of Black Creek in Carbon County, Pennsylvania in the United States.

Quakake Creek (Unami for "pine woods") joins Black Creek near the borough of Weatherly, approximately 4.3 miles (6.9 km) upstream of the Lehigh River.

== See also ==
- List of rivers of Pennsylvania
