= Bear Mountain (Carbon County, Pennsylvania) =

Mountain in Pennsylvania, United States of America

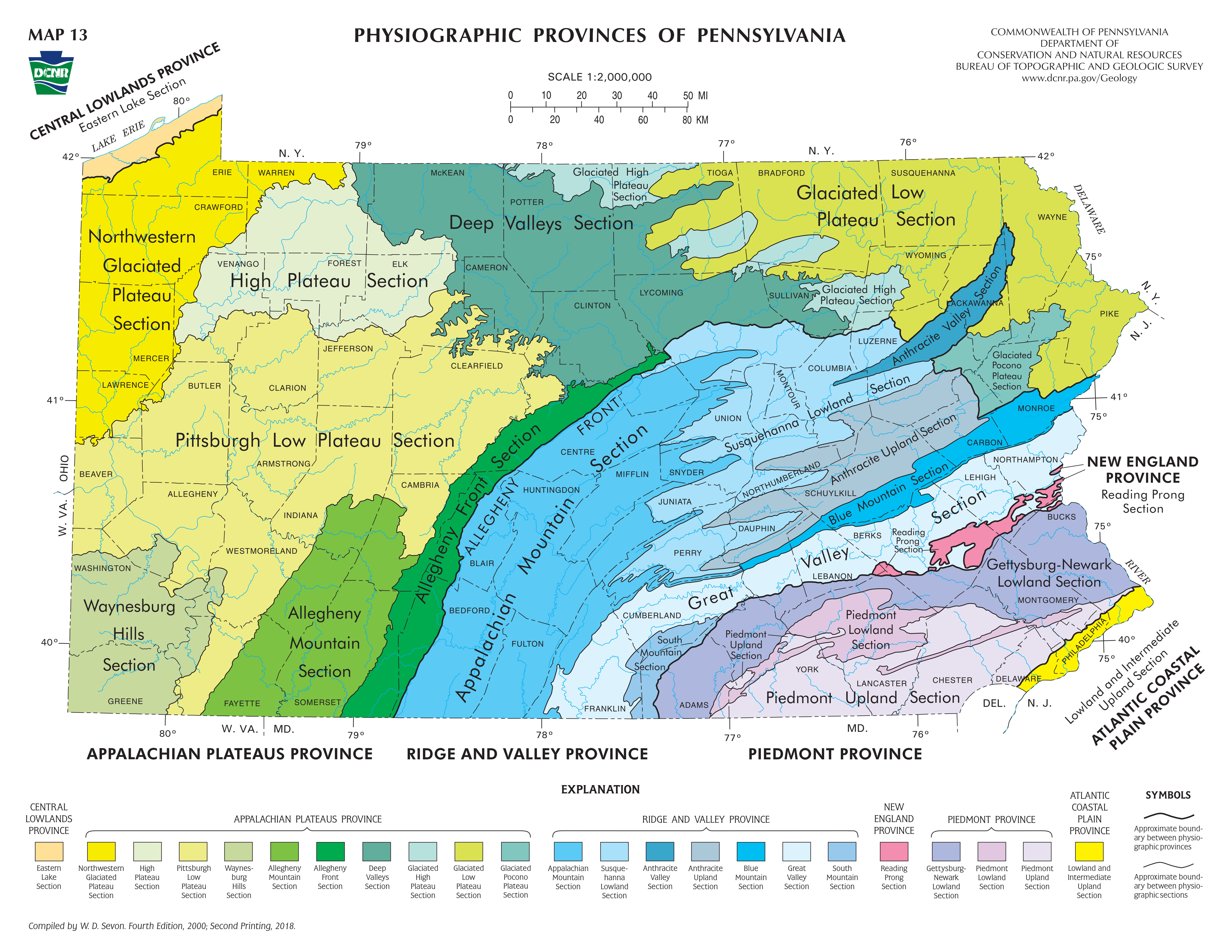

Highest point
- Peak: Knob nearest Lehigh
- Elevation: 1,673 ft (510 m)
- Coordinates: 40°52′25″N 75°41′58″W

Dimensions
- Length: 10 mi (16 km) west-southwest-to-east-northeast
- Width: 6.5–12.5 km (4.0–7.8 mi) north-south

Geography
- Country: United States
- State: Pennsylvania
- Borders on: Poconos and Great Appalachian Valley

Geology
- Orogenies: Ridge-and-Valley Appalachians, Appalachian Mountains

Bear Mountain, in the Lehigh Valley of Pennsylvania several miles above the Lehigh Gap, is a steep-sided east bank ridgeline running about 9.96 miles (16.03 km) between the hairpin turn in the Lehigh the Lenape Amerindian people (Delaware people) visualized as a bear's snout, along many water gap gorges, to the steep face dropping down to the Penn Forest Reservoir.

The sparsely settled mountain ridge is part of the Ridge-and-Valley Appalachians, oriented east-northeast towards the Delaware River climbing rapidly from the Lehigh left bank shoreline from about 580 feet (180 m) over an overhanging knob opposite the mouth of Mauch Chunk Creek to more than 1,200 feet (370 m) in less than 1.01 miles (1.63 km) and to over 1,480 feet (450 m) in just 1.34 miles (2.16 km) the tourism and business district of Jim Thorpe. Bear Mountain is the prominent peak opposite the business district of the tourist attractions of Jim Thorpe in Carbon County, once termed being in the heart of "Switzerland of the United States". The former township and borough of East Mauch Chunk was settled outside the hustle and confusion of cross-river boomtown Mauch Chunk
