= Lausanne Township, Pennsylvania =

Township in Pennsylvania, US

Lausanne Township
- Township
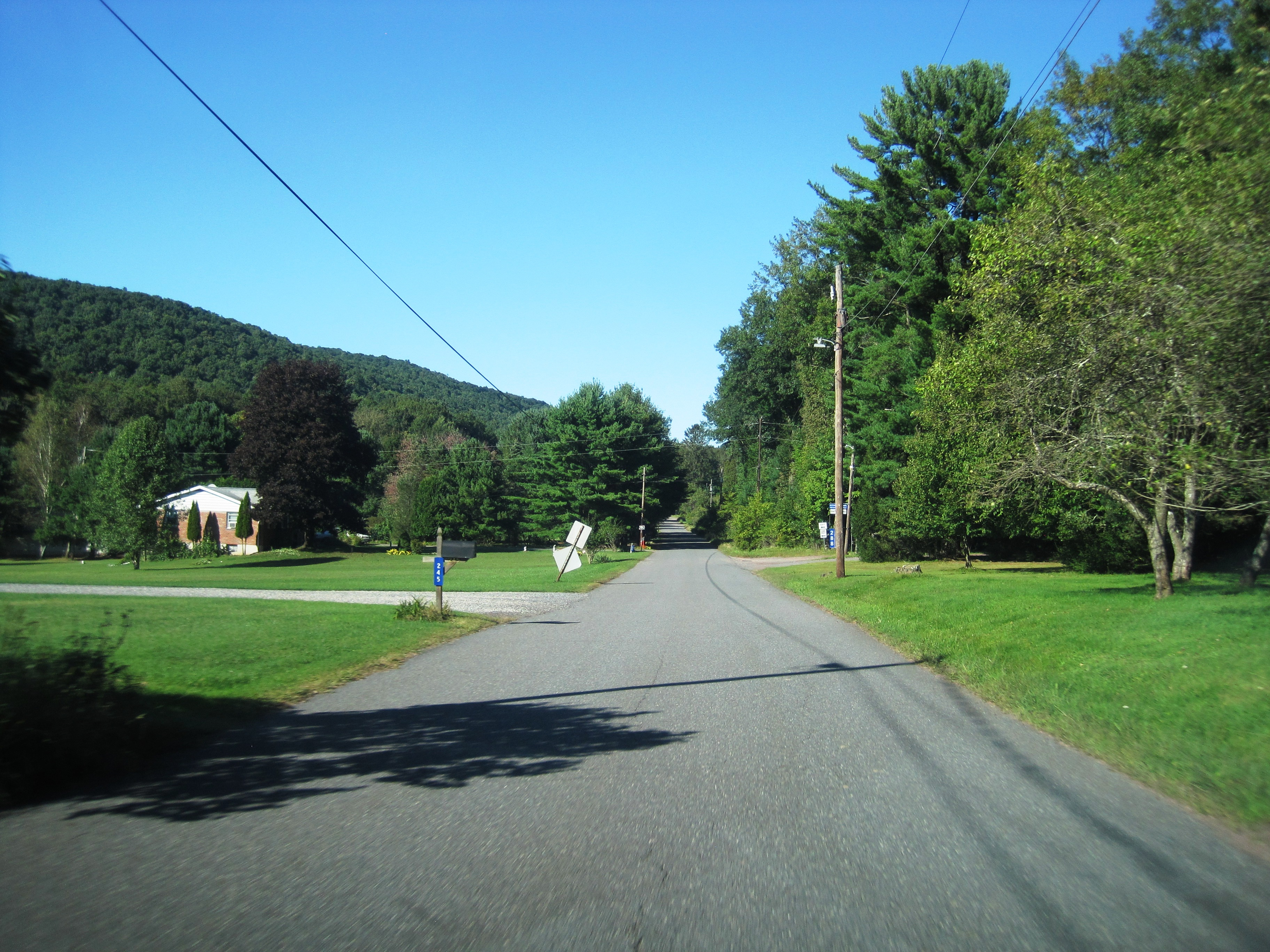
- Along Stagecoach Road north of the municipal offices

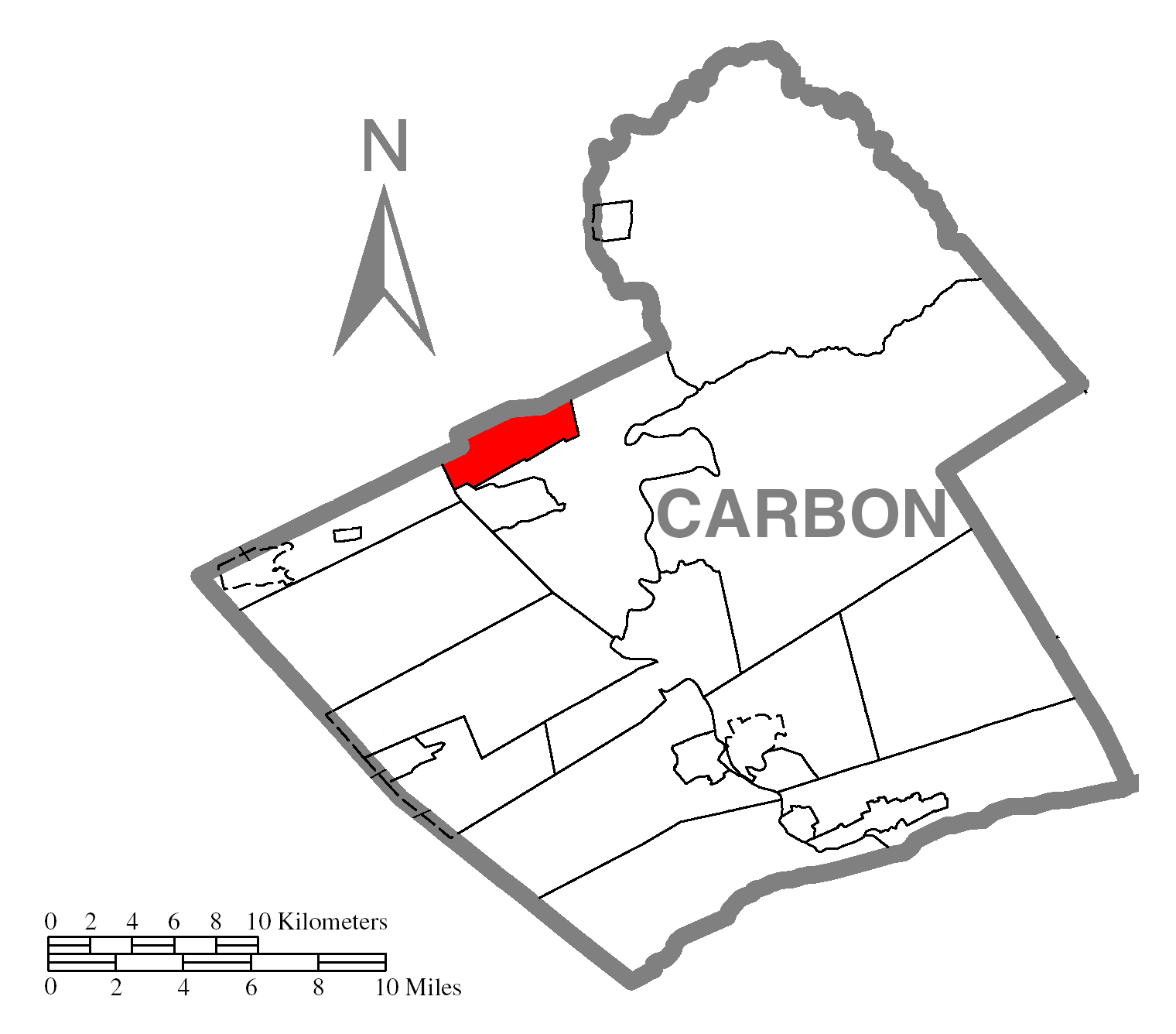
- Location of Lausanne Township in Carbon County

- Location of Carbon County in Pennsylvania
- Coordinates: 40°57′30″N 75°49′59″W
- Country: United States
- State: Pennsylvania
- County: Carbon

Area
  - Total: 5.95 sq mi (15.42 km^{2})
  - Land: 5.95 sq mi (15.42 km^{2})
  - Water: 0 sq mi (0.00 km^{2})
- Elevation: 1,375 ft (419 m)

Population (2010)
  - Total: 237
  - Estimate (2016): 229
  - Density: 38.5/sq mi (14.85/km^{2})
- Time zone: UTC-5 (EST)
  - Summer (DST): UTC-4 (EDT)
- Area code: 570
- FIPS code: 42-025-41888

Lausanne Township is a township in Carbon County, Pennsylvania. It is part of Northeastern Pennsylvania. The township dates back to 1808 when the first Lausanne settlement was organized with a local frontier government.

== History ==
The original population of Lausanne Landing was quite variable limited to a handful of year-round settlers and varying groups of itinerant workmen from expeditions sent to log, mine, or build boats. The current town population was 237 at the 2010 census. The township was named after Lausanne, in Switzerland and the bowl shaped valley near its first settlement at Lausanne Landing has often been called the Switzerland of America.

== Geography ==
The township is located along the northern border of Carbon County, with Luzerne County to the north. It lies in a valley bordered by the parallel ridges of Buck Mountain to the north and Round Head Mountain to the south. Its only village is Buck Mountain, at the base of the mountain with the same name. Historically, it began as part of the original Northampton County, which was larger than New Jersey, with a township centered at Lausanne Landing and consisted of the lands in most of what is now Carbon County.

According to the United States Census Bureau, the township has a total area of 5.9 square miles (15.4 km^{2}), all of it land. It is part of the Lehigh River watershed.

Lausanne has a warm-summer humid continental climate (Dfb) and the hardiness zones are 5b and 6a. Average monthly temperatures in Buck Mountain range from 24.4 °F in January to 69.7 °F in July.

=== Neighboring municipalities ===
- Lehigh Township (east and south)
- Weatherly (southwest)
- Banks Township (west)
- Foster Township, Luzerne County (north)

== History ==
Lausanne Township was originally as part of the original Northampton County in the 'Towamensing District', a part of the unorganized wilderness above Blue Mountain. The Towamensing District was then reorganized in 1808 when the section of the county above Blue Mountain was set out as individual townships, and Schuylkill County was created:

1. 1752 Northampton County was erected out of Bucks County. At that time, all of Northampton north of the Blue Mountains was known as the Towamensing District, “Towamensing” being an Indian word for “wilderness”. The Moravians, who established the first white settlement, knew the region north of the mountains as “St. Anthony's Wilderness”.

2. 1768 The district was divided into Towamensing Twp. on the east bank of the Lehigh River and Penn Twp. on the west bank.
3. 1808 Lausanne Twp. was erected out of the upper section of Penn Twp. Penn was further divided into East and West Penn, with West Penn being in newly formed Schuylkill County.
4. 1818 Mauch Chunk founded. Josiah White and Erskine Hazard travel from Philadelphia up into the Lehigh River wilderness with a crew of 18 men from White's wire rope factory at the falls of the Schuylkill River to begin work on river improvements. White and Hazard had formed the Lehigh Coal Co. and the Lehigh Navigation Co., the first to mine the coal, the second to get it to market. Work began on the river at the mouth of the Mauch Chunk Creek on the Lehigh, thus founding the town. These two companies would merge into the Lehigh Coal & Navigation Co. in a few years.

5. 1827 On August 23, Mauch Chunk Twp. was formed out of the northern part of E. Penn Twp. and a small section of southern Lausanne Twp. Mauch Chunk Twp. included the villages that would later be the boroughs of Mauch Chunk, Summit Hill and Nesquehoning. Lansford also lay within the Twp., but at the time of its formation there was no village of Lansford.

— Jack Sterling, Ancestry.com's: Carbon County Boroughs and Townships

"And a small section of southern Lausanne Twp." was to set a pattern. The township remained a nurturing organizational government through a number of additional divisions, children split off in the past to attain greater success and populations with ever diminished territory each time it suffered a division.

1842
Banks Township erected from the Northwestern part of Lausanne.
1843
Carbon County created from Northern Northampton and Monroe Counties.
1847
Packer Township set off from Lausanne.
1863
Weatherly set off from Lausanne at this time, and becomes the third borough in the county after Mauch Chunk and East Mauch Chunk.
1875
Lehigh Township made up of lands along the west bank of the Lehigh River is set off from Lausanne from Glen Onoko north to the Luzerne County line, leaving a small rump community. Both are very rural.

Today, the township is a narrow strip too small to effectively grow or split, wedged against the Luzerne-Carbon County border in rough country.

== Transportation ==
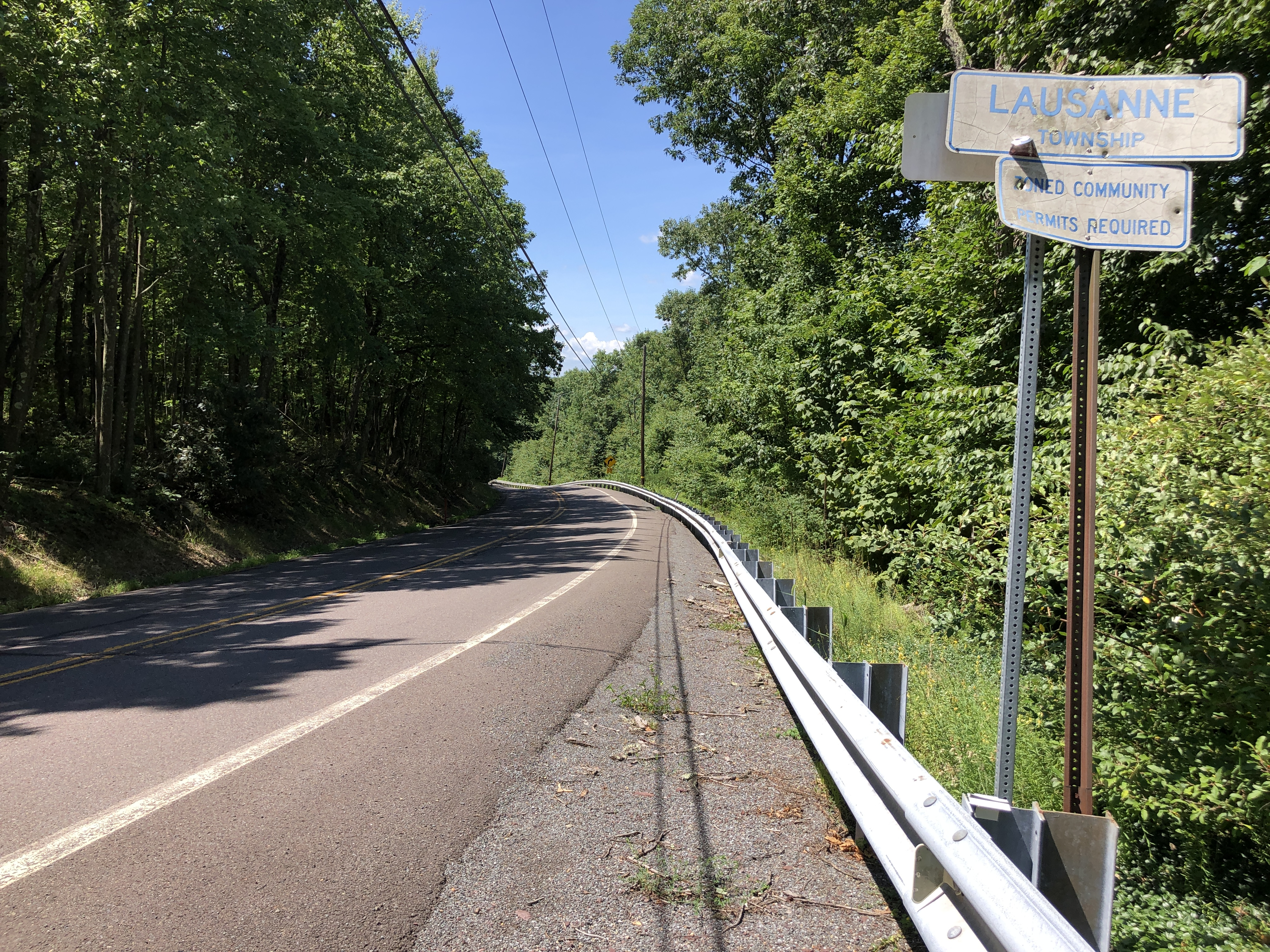
Entering Lausanne Township from Lehigh Township along Buck Mountain Road

As of 2007, there were 6.77 miles (10.90 km) of public roads in Lausanne Township, of which 5.36 miles (8.63 km) were maintained by the Pennsylvania Department of Transportation (PennDOT) and 1.41 miles (2.27 km) were maintained by the township.

No numbered highways pass through Lausanne Township. The main thoroughfares within the township include Buck Mountain Road and Eckley Road.

== Demographics ==
Historical population
Census	Pop.	Note	%±
2010	237		—
2016 (est.)	229		−3.4%
U.S. Decennial Census

As of the census of 2000, there were 218 people, 88 households, and 60 families residing in the township. The population density was 37.7 inhabitants per square mile (14.6/km^{2}). There were 109 housing units at an average density of 18.9/sq mi (7.3/km^{2}). The racial makeup of the township was 100.00% White.

There were 88 households, out of which 30.7% had children under the age of 18 living with them, 61.4% were married couples living together, 4.5% had a female householder with no husband present, and 30.7% were non-families. 27.3% of all households were made up of individuals, and 6.8% had someone living alone who was 65 years of age or older. The average household size was 2.48 and the average family size was 2.97.

In the township the population was spread out, with 22.0% under the age of 18, 6.9% from 18 to 24, 30.3% from 25 to 44, 27.1% from 45 to 64, and 13.8% who were 65 years of age or older. The median age was 41 years. For every 100 females, there were 98.2 males. For every 100 females age 18 and over, there were 104.8 males.

The median income for a household in the township was $30,625, and the median income for a family was $42,679. Males had a median income of $30,938 versus $17,212 for females. The per capita income for the township was $16,797. About 6.2% of families and 11.9% of the population were below the poverty line, including 20.0% of those under the age of eighteen and 5.4% of those sixty five or over.
