= Saddle (landform) =

Land connecting two high points

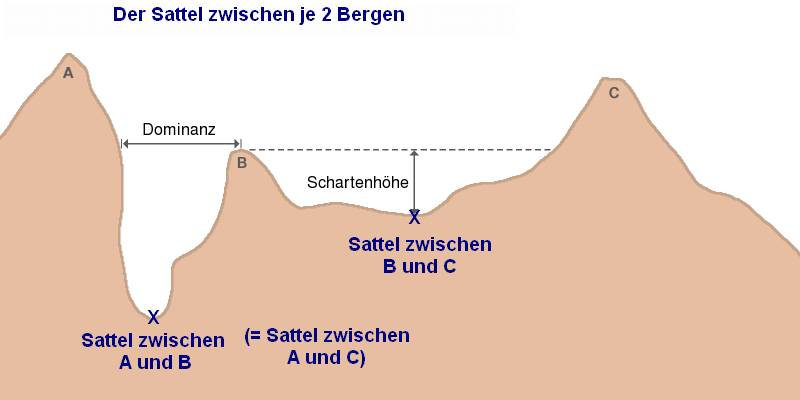
Cross-section diagram of three hills, with two saddles marked by X. • There are three peaks (Schartenhöhe) or prominences shown labeled 'A', 'B', & 'C'. • The diagram illustrates the topographic isolation (German: Dominanz)-the distance from a prominence which is also a minimum to the point of the same height. • The 'isolation' (German: Dominanz) of the right two peaks is not labeled, but is represented by the dashed line. • "sattel zwischen" means saddle between, so the labeling is saying the saddle between A and C is the same saddle as between A and B

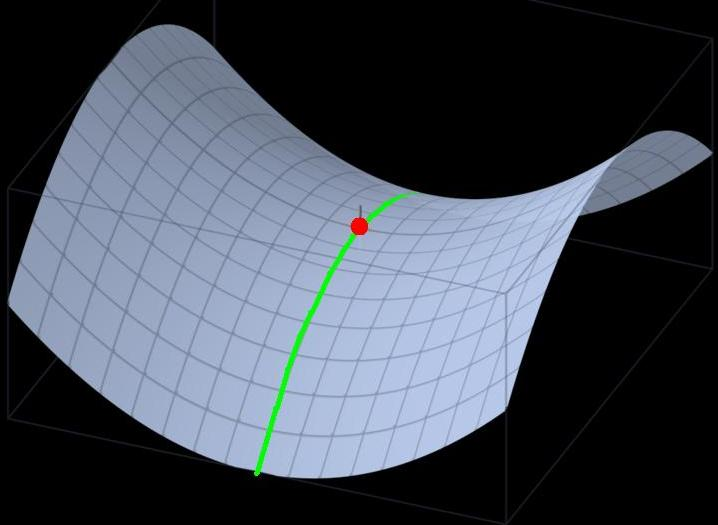
Route along a saddle

The saddle between two hills or mountains is the region surrounding the saddle point, the lowest point on the line tracing the drainage divide connecting the peaks. When, and if, the saddle is navigable, even if only on foot, the saddle of a (optimal) pass between the two massifs, is the area generally found around the lowest route on which one could pass between the two summits, which includes that point which is a mathematically when graphed a relative high along one axis, and a relative low in the perpendicular axis, simultaneously; that point being by definition the col of the saddle.

== Topography ==
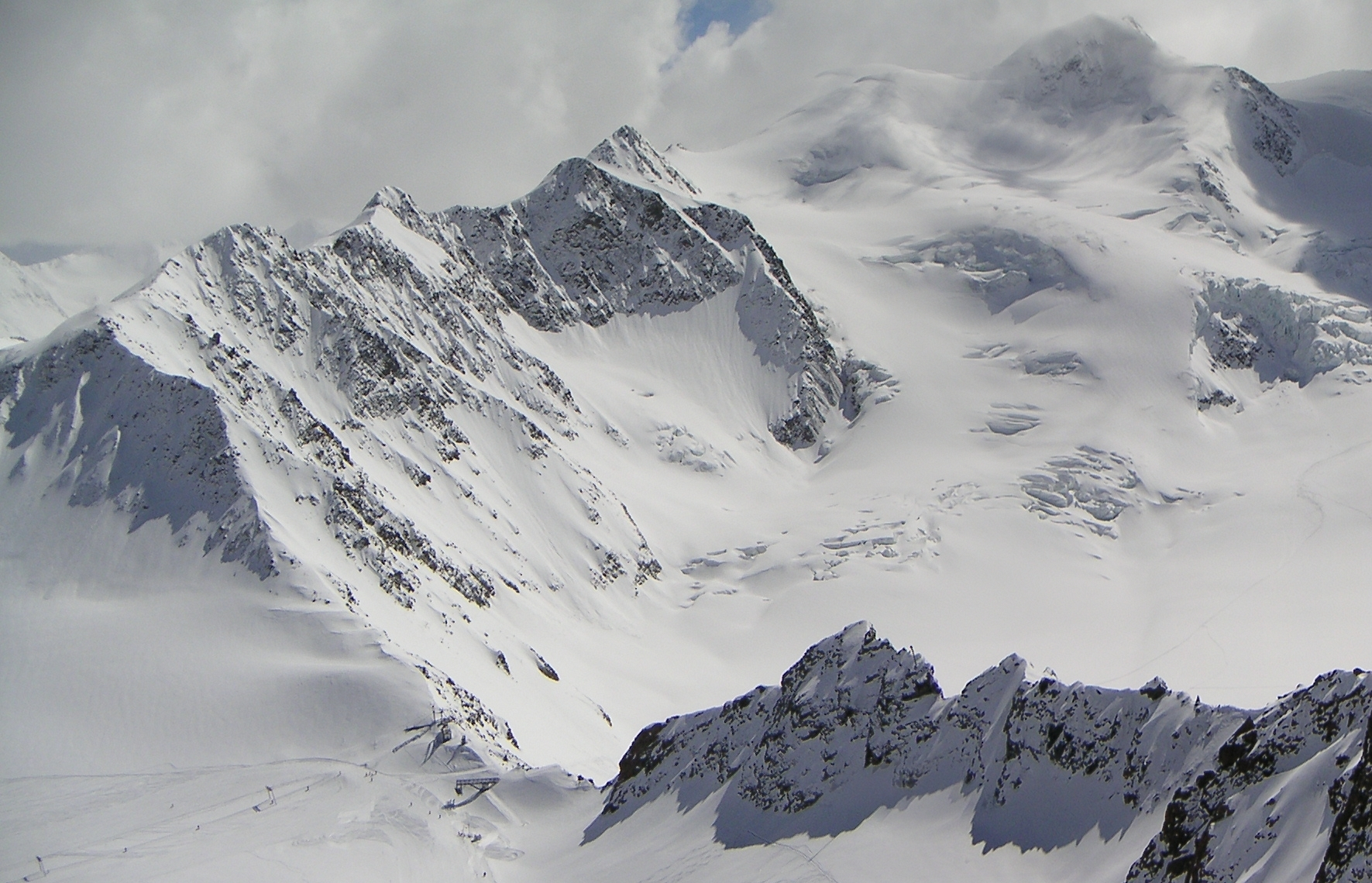
The saddle Mittelbergjoch (lower edge, left from middle) in Tyrolia in Austria. It is frequently crossed by mountaineers on the way up to the Wildspitze (3.768 m, right upper corner). In the diagram top right, the saddle is comparable to the leftmost drawn type.

A saddle is the lowest area between two highlands (prominences or peaks) which has two wings which span the divide (the line between the two prominences) by crossing the divide at an angle, and, so is concurrently the local highpoint of the land surface which falls off in the lower direction. That is, the drainage divide is a ridge along the high point of the saddle, as well as between the two peaks and so defines the major reference axis. A saddle can vary from a sharp, narrow gap to a broad, comfortable, sway-backed, shallow valley so long as it is both the high point in the sloping faces which descends to lower elevations and the low area between the two (or three or four. (Note: See the center image point '-C-' in the topographical map image.)) flanking summits. Concurrently, along a different axis, it is the low point between two peaks, so as such, is the likely 'optimal' high point in a pass if the saddle is traversed by a track, road or railway.

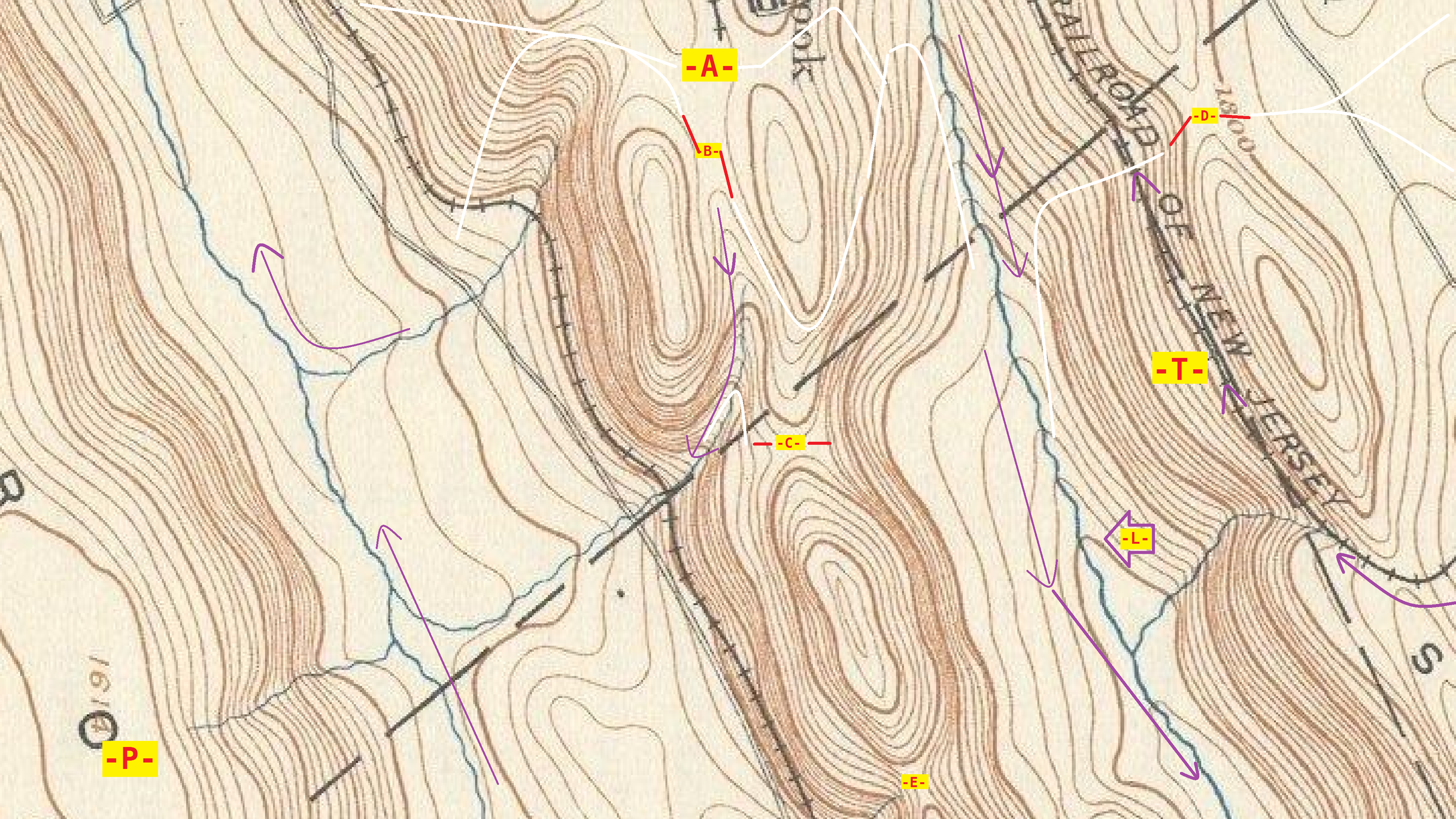
USGS topographic map of ridges and saddles near Hazelton, Pennsylvania (closer view). The points -A-, -B-, -C-, -D- and, -E- all represent saddles — relative minimums oriented to two or more nearby peaks, but a local maxima relative to lower land.

=== Saddles and cols ===
The relationship between saddles and cols is not universally agreed upon. A col is sometimes defined as the lowest point on a saddle co-linear with the drainage divide that connects the peaks. Whittow describes a saddle as "low point or col on a ridge between two summits", whilst the Oxford Dictionary of English implies that a col is the lowest point on the saddle. Monkhouse describes a saddle as a "broad, flat col in a ridge between two mountain summits."

The term col tends to be associated more with mountain, rather than hill, ranges.

The height of a summit above its highest saddle (called the key saddle) is effectively a measure of a hill's prominence, an important measure of the independence of its summit. Saddles lie on the line of the watershed between two hills.

== Structural geology ==
In structural geology, a saddle is a depression located along the axial trend of an anticline.

== Mathematical saddles ==
A 'saddle point' in mathematics derives its name from the fact that the prototypical example in two dimensions is a surface that curves up in one direction, and curves down in a different direction, resembling a riding saddle or a mountain pass between two peaks forming a landform saddle.
