= Broad Mountain (Lehigh Valley) =

Appalachian barrier ridge

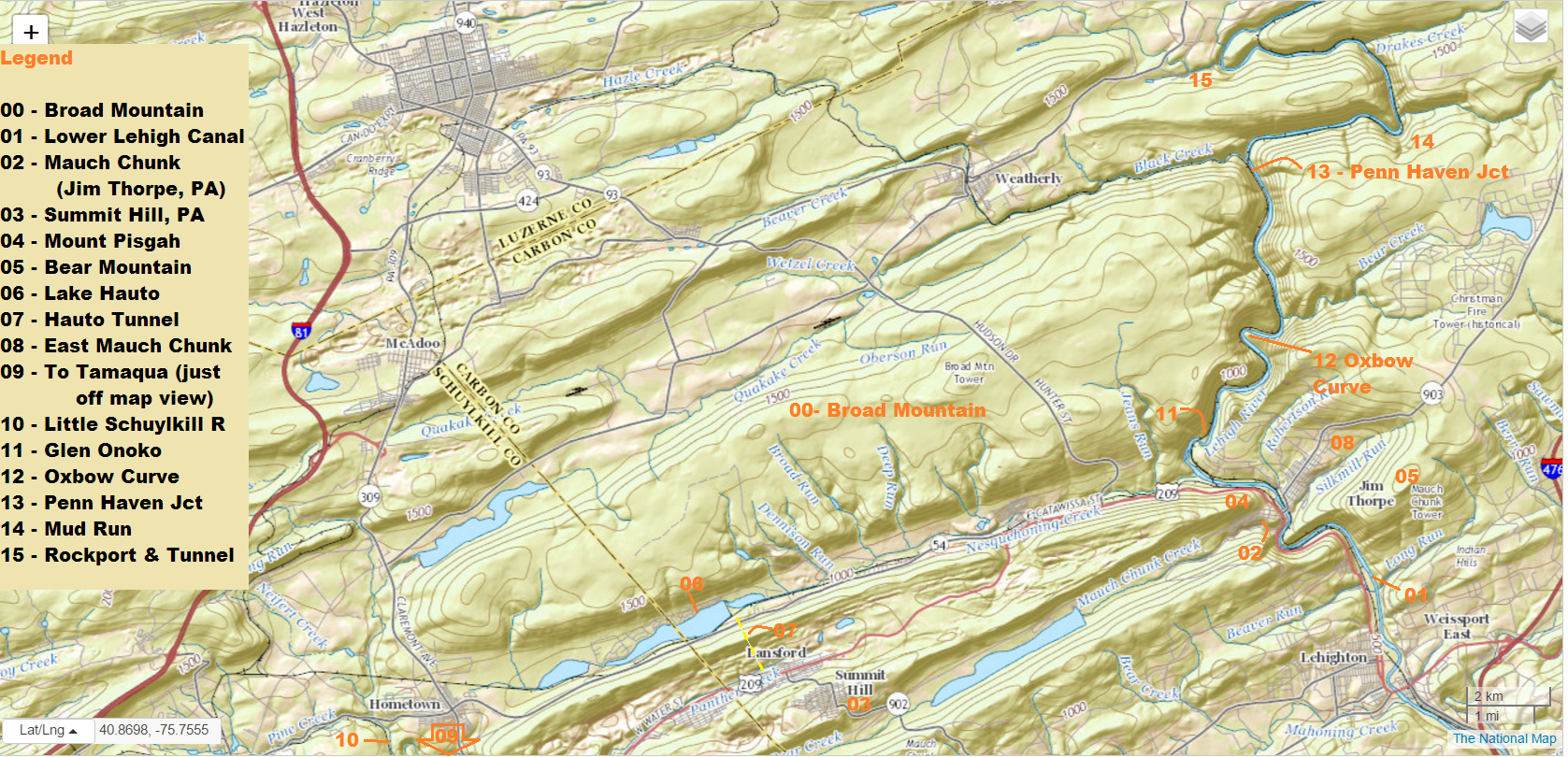
- The barrier wall of Broad Mountain (center) west of Lehigh Gorge and north of Tamaqua, Nesquehoning, and Jim Thorpe

Highest point
- Peak: Broad Mountain, Carbon County, Pennsylvania
- Elevation: 1,795 ft (547 m)
- Prominence: 1,772 ft (540 m)1170284, Range,
- Coordinates: 40°54′34″N 75°48′24″W

Dimensions
- Length: 14–15.0 mi (22.5–24.1 km) east-west

Geography
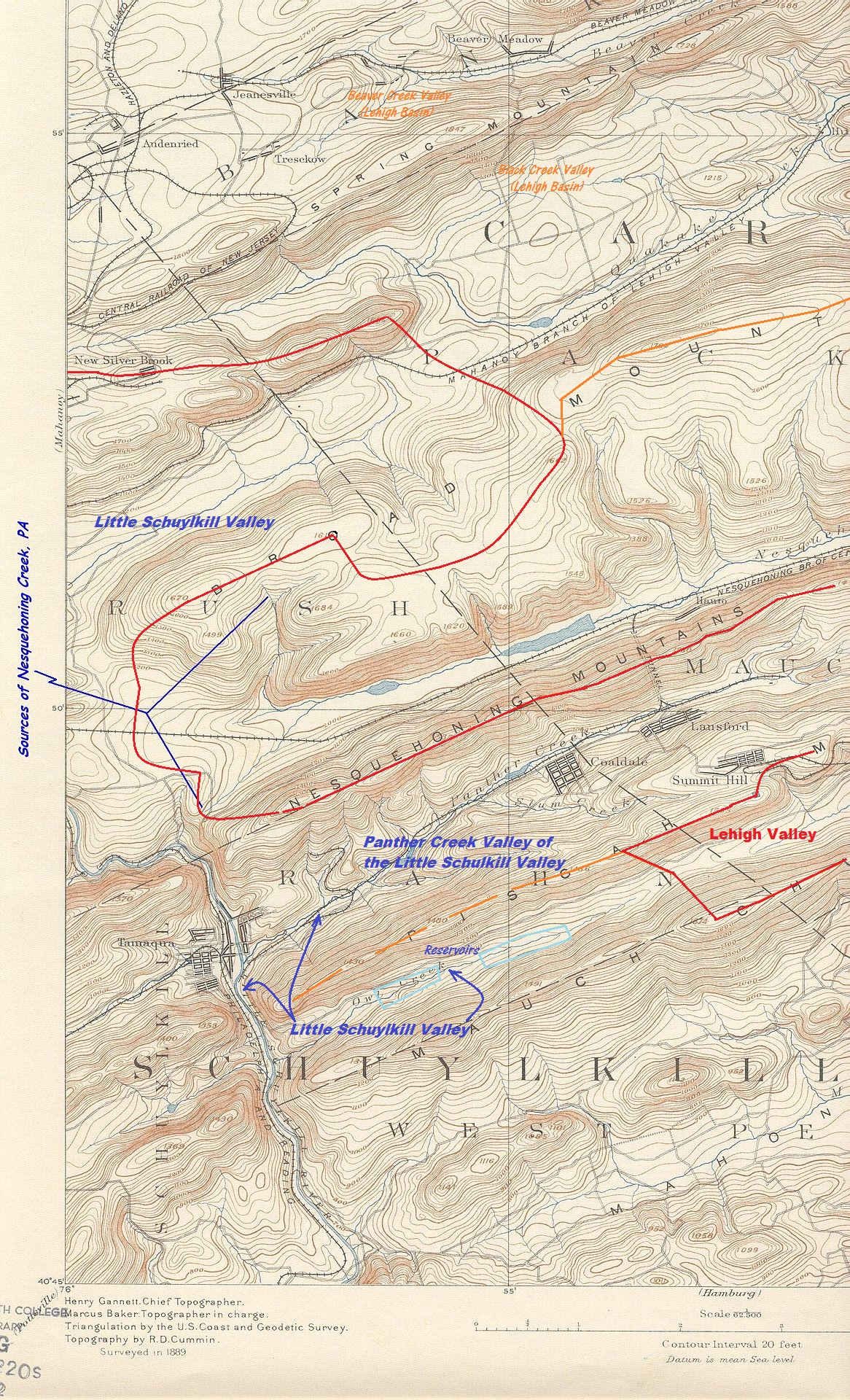
- Broad Mountain had a large importance in local rail transportation.
- Country: United States
- State: Pennsylvania
- Borders on: Ridge-and-Valley Appalachians, Nesquehoning Creek and Upper Lehigh River at lower Lehigh Gorge

Geology
- Orogeny: Appalachian Mountains
- Rock age: Silurian??
- Rock types: Tuscarora Formation?? and Shawangunk Formation; sedimentary

Broad Mountain or Broad Ridge in the Ridge-and-Valley Appalachians in Carbon County and Schuylkill County in Pennsylvania is a steep-faced, anthracite-bearing barrier ridge just south of both Beaver Meadows and Weatherly, north of Nesquehoning and west and south of the Lehigh River basin west of the southwest border of the Poconos. The mountain ridge line is mostly flat and looks very similar to the man-made piles of culm in the region from the roads and towns looking up.

== Geography ==
The long ridge has several peaks and the west-southwest peak in Schuylkill County, Pennsylvania is just 23 feet (7.0 m) short of the summit altitude of the Carbon County peak. The west-southwest section also continues an important watershed terrain separating the waters of the Schuylkill basin from those of the Lehigh River, which receives the majority of outflow. Broad Ridge and Nesquehoning Mountain are joined together at elevation at the location of Hometown, Pennsylvania through which an important railroad line and Pennsylvania Route 54 climb from Nesquehoning, nestled into a notch around the ridge's southern face.

Oriented east-west and flanked in its south by Nesquehoning Creek, the ridge extends 14 miles (23 km) from the right bank of the Lehigh Gorge to the left bank of the Little Schuylkill River near the railroad junctions at Hometown and Delano.

== See also ==
- Blue Mountain Geology
- Lausanne Landing
- Lehigh-Susquehanna Turnpike
- Penn Haven Junction
