= Beaver Meadow Railroad and Coal Company =

Pennsylvanian Railway Company

Beaver Meadow Railroad & Coal Company
Overview
- Locale: Near Beaver Meadows, Pennsylvania
- Dates of operation: April 7, 1830–July 8, 1864
- Successor: Lehigh Valley Railroad

The Beaver Meadow Railroad & Coal Company (BMRC) was chartered April 7, 1830, to build a railroad from the mines near Beaver Meadows, Pennsylvania, beyond Broad Mountain along Beaver Creek to Penn Haven and along the Lehigh River through present-day Jim Thorpe, Pennsylvania to the Lehigh Canal at Parryville, Pennsylvania. The settlement of Beaver Meadows dated to a 1787 land sale to Patrick and Mary Keene, thence to Nathan Beach.

== History ==
Beaver Meadow Railroad and Coal Company was the first railroad in the Lehigh Valley region of eastern Pennsylvania to use locomotives. When organized the BMRC was authorized to acquire $250,000 capital. The BMRC, taking immediate advantage of a charter provision which allowed them to own and work 200 acres of coal land as an incentive for building a railroad from mines to either the Lehigh River or Little Schuylkill then increased its capitalization ceiling to $800,000.

The Beaver Meadow Mines were discovered in 1812 by Nathan Beach. The land had an unclear title until Judge Barnes, owner of the conflicting claim, purchased Beach's tract. The already established Lehigh Coal & Navigation Company quickly labeled the BMRC a speculative venture which led to friction between the two enterprises. By 1833 the design was finished. The engineers included Ario Pardee, who was later a coal magnate in the Hazleton, Pennsylvania region. The route was set from the Beaver Meadow mines to the Lehigh River and down the river on its northern shore beyond Turnhole in present-day Glen Onoko to Parryville between Mauch Chunk in present-day Jim Thorpe, and then to the Blue Mountain Gap. The dual markets of New York City and Philadelphia could be reached via the Lehigh Canal, and the favorable grades were factors in the choice of routes. Legislature authorized ownership of 800 additional acres of coal lands. The BMRC cited Baltimore and Ohio Railroad’s locomotive "York" costs of $16 a day in comparison with wagon operation of $33. By 1834, because of the difficulty in obtaining agreement with the Lehigh Canal on tolls, Allentown was pursued as the road's terminus.

In 1836, an agreement on tolls was reached, and twelve miles of rail line were developed from the coal mines to the Lehigh River. The remaining fourteen miles to Weissport were under contract to be developed. Three locomotives from Garrett & Eastwick in Philadelphia were operating on the completed line by 1837, a promise the company kept. On November 5, 1836 the Beaver Meadow Register reported, "The Beaver Meadow Railroad opened … beside some bottles of champagne." One locomotive was hauled over 145-foot-high planes, delivering coal between Beaver Meadow and Weatherly. Mules pulled the empty cars up and down the planes. In the summer of 1836, Pardee and others began utilizing the Hazleton Railroad from Weatherly to Hazleton to open up even more coal fields to the company. The Hazleton Railroad ran over BMRC track from Weatherly to Penn Haven a canal wharf.

Originally wooden rails, covered with an iron strap, were used, and the locomotives were initially wood-burning. Frequent floods along the Lehigh River notwithstanding, the railroad gained rapid success, as the mines serviced by it were developed. In early 1838, it was reported that the five Garrett and Eastwick locomotives (owned by the BMRC) were fired exclusively with anthracite. One of these locomotives, the Hercules, had a revolutionary impact on the future development of American railroads. The Hercules was the earliest locomotive to have the 4-4-0 wheel arrangement which for a time became standard for American locomotives. It was the first locomotive to combine the use of an independent leading wheel truck with equalizing lever. Due to this innovation, the Hercules was adapted to operating in the rough Pennsylvania terrain and helped to open much of the United States to railroad construction.

In 1840, the BMRC offered to lease its line and its 30- to 60,000-ton annual coal production, and to furnish to the lessee railcars, engines and engineers. This was first leased to A. H. VanCleve & Company in 1841, and was operated by that firm until 1846. William Milnes & Company then worked the mines for about a year. The firm of Hamberger & Company then leased them and continued operations until 1850, after which the mines were abandoned until 1881, when they were leased to Coxe Brothers & Company.

After the flood of 1841, the BMRC abandoned its track from opposite Mauch Chunk to Parrysville, partly rebuilt by the Lehigh Valley Railroad in 1855. The new coal port was located at East Mauch Chunk and was known as "Lousy Bay." Beaver Meadow had a railroad foundry as well as the machine shops until these facilities were moved to Weatherly in 1849. The difficulty of crossing the planes with locomotives needing repairs was a factor in this decision.

By 1849, when the line had 2.5 miles of H-rail, five locomotives and 297 coal cars, it delivered 84,396 tons of coal to the canal at East Mauch Chunk. In 1849, the company had decided to replace the light wooden rails with flat iron bars fastened with t-rails. The work was done during the winter of 1849 and completed by the spring of 1850. The road was in three divisions, Upper, mines to Weatherly, six miles; Middle, Weatherly to Penn Haven, five miles; Lower, Penn Haven to East Mauch Chunk, nine miles, laid with 62 tons of flat bar iron rail. Two years after the Hazleton Railroad opened its high-level line of 1852 (after another flood) to Penn Haven, the BMRC decided to eliminate the two inclined planes at Weatherly with legislative assent in 1853. With the purchase of the abandoned Hazleton Railroad line, plane operation ended in 1855. The new section of the Beaver Meadow had a grade of 145 feet to the mile for 1.75 miles, and 135 feet for the next 4,000 feet. The BMRC also built to Honeybrook Mines during 1855-56, thereby gaining all coal production from that mine.

By 1863, the line extended to Audenreid, had five engine houses and a machine shop. Equipment consisted of nineteen locomotives, two passenger cars, one for baggage and mail, three freight and a thousand four-wheeled coal cars and 300 eight-wheeled coal cars. In delivering 1,595,729 tons of anthracite, the BMRC had operated coal trains 208,573 miles. Passenger and freight trains carrying 21,500 passengers and 15,022 tons of freight traveled 38,500 miles.

Merged into the Lehigh Valley Railroad on July 8, 1864, the Beaver Meadow brought to its new owner its first coal lands. The BMRC became known as the Beaver Meadows Branch of the Lehigh Valley Railroad.
