= Lausanne–Nescopeck Turnpike =

The Lausanne–Nescopeck Turnpike or Susquehanna & Lehigh Turnpike (1804–1840s), also mentioned often as the Lehigh–Susquehanna Turnpike (or Lehigh & Susquehanna Turnpike) (Note: The name preference seems geographically linked to the perspective of the location of the offices of the particular newspaper reporting on the toll road. These mentions are themselves rare since there wasn't much controversial about a public way unless it involved deaths or felony larceny.) and opened in 1805, was a highly profitable foot traffic toll road established during the earliest days of the American canal age—one of the many privately funded road (and transport infrastructure) projects established after the 1790s in the first years of the young United States era to open up and promote growth along either side of the American Frontiers by building connecting transport infrastructure.

== History ==
To the new Homesteader, a road meant a way to send excess product east for monies, a way to buy necessaries and desired goods to ease the strains of a hard life. The needs of the easterners left behind were for foods, raw materials, while to the manufacturing industrialists, the settlers represented a market which had a demand for their wares.

Like many others of the era, the toll road consisted generally of improvements along the path of an ancient Susquehannock Amerindian trail, traveling generally south-southeast to north-northwest across the parallel barrier ridges and steep valleys in the Ridge and Valley Appalachians and connecting the center waters of the Lehigh River valley on the opposite shore from the Lehigh Gorge exit to Nescopeck, Pennsylvania (and Berwick on the opposite shore of the (Main Branch) Susquehanna River.

Ultimately, Berwick to Tioga & Elmira, New York was linked via the Susquehanna & Tioga Turnpike, which was built to provide communication from the cities and towns along the Delaware River. This included communities in New Jersey and Delaware in the Delaware Valley and Philadelphia and Buffalo, New York, beginning from Lausanne Landing (and Landing Tavern), at the mouth of Nesquehoning Creek along the southeastern escarpment of Broad Mountain descending into and through Weatherly, and up the Hazel Creek across the drainage divide in the saddle hosting Hazleton, Pennsylvania, then proceeding along more westerly in a descent from the highland paths down traverses of a string of valleys near or through the Nescopeck Creek valley.

The first section of the turnpike was authorized by an act of the Legislature "March 19th, A.D. 1804" enabling the Governor to incorporate a company by the name of the President, Managers and Company of the Susquehanna and Lehigh Turnpike to make an "artificial road from Nescopeck on the N. E. branch of the Susquehanna, to the Lehigh River." The original capital stock was authorized in the amount of $60,000, composed of 600 shares at $100 a share. The success of the Susquehanna & Lehigh Turnpike carried over to the need to continue pushing north into New York state with a turnpike.

— News Feature, Benton News

The continuation, starting with a ferry across the Susquehanna between Nescopeck and Berwick, was chartered in 1805 as the Susquehanna & Tioga Turnpike connecting through Tioga, Elmira to Buffalo, connecting communities along the Lehigh & Delaware Valleys in New Jersey, Delaware, as well as America's largest city of the era, Philadelphia to Lake Erie—so the American far west of the day, Minnesota, Wisconsin and Chicago.

== See also ==
- Pennsylvania Route 93: runs along the same transportation corridor, though parts are now straightened and displaced parallel to the old turnpike trail since the modern road has cuttings not possible to the 19th-century settlers.
- Susquehanna & Tioga Turnpike (1806): in what might be considered a cross-river continuation, the separate corporation starting NNW from Berwick across the fiver from Nescopeck connect the Turnpike and the Lehigh and Delaware River valley communities to the Great Lakes at Lake Erie via Elmira, New York.
