= Kline Township, Schuylkill County, Pennsylvania =

Township in Pennsylvania, US

Coordinates: 40°52′29″N 75°59′58″W

Kline Township, Pennsylvania
- Township
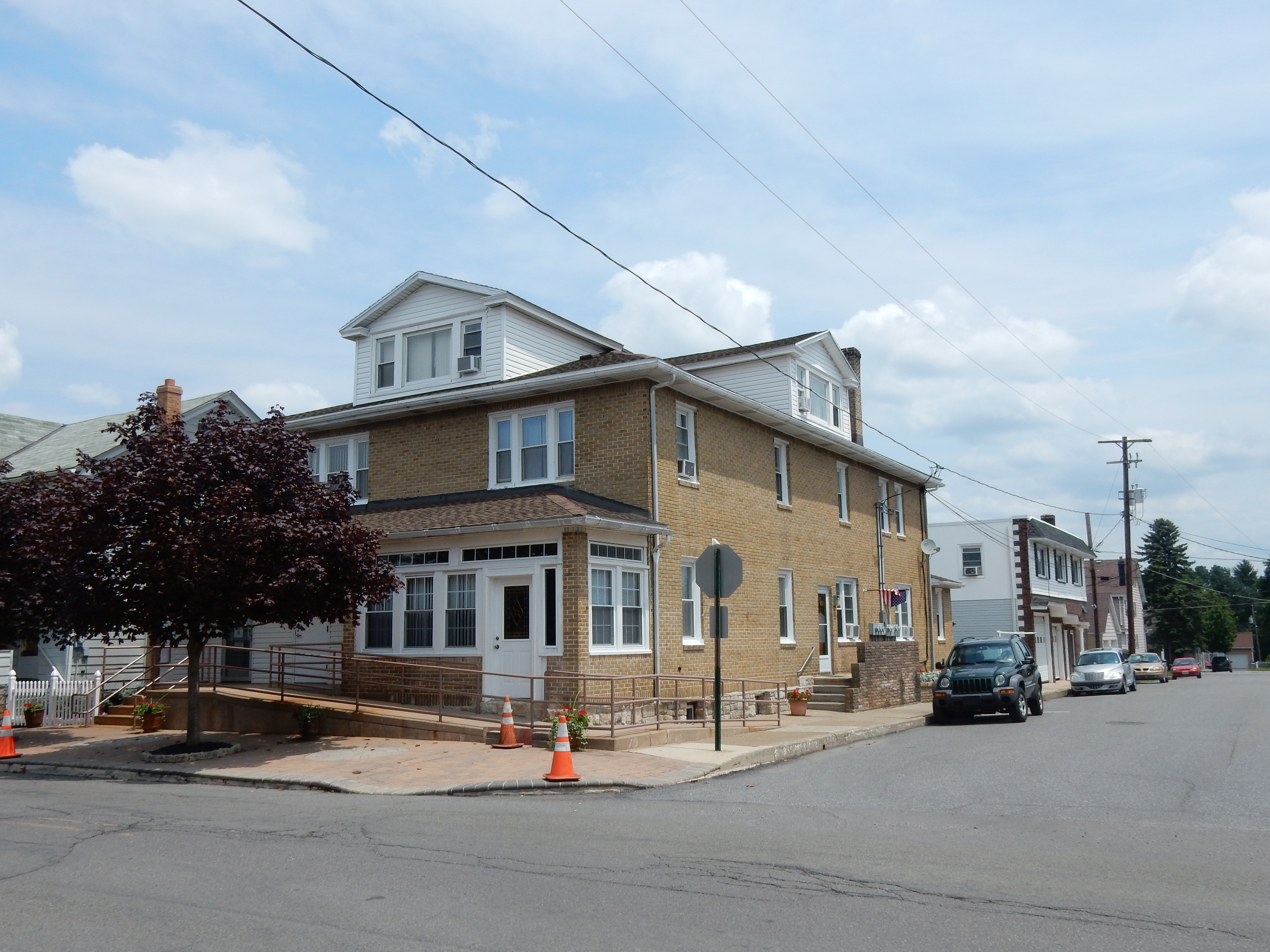
- Post Office in Kelayres, Kline Township.

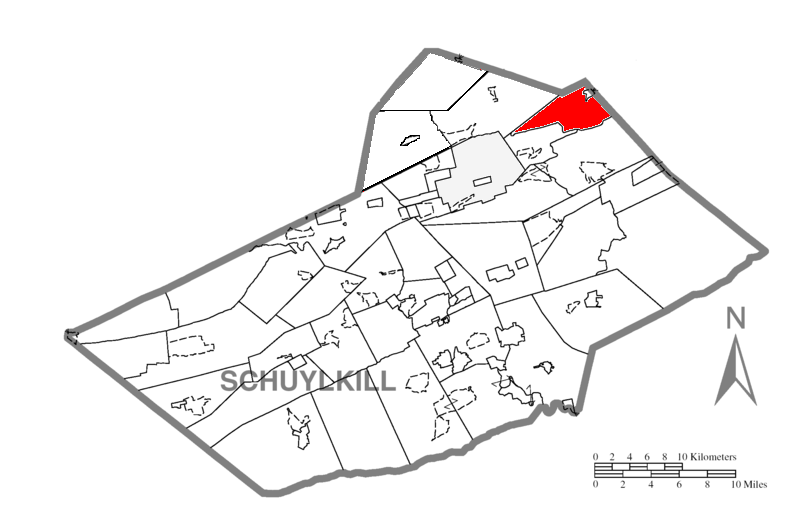
- Map of Schuylkill County, Pennsylvania Highlighting Kline Township

- Map of Schuylkill County, Pennsylvania
- Country: United States
- State: Pennsylvania
- County: Schuylkill
- Settled: 1791
- Incorporated: 1873

Area
  - Total: 12.42 sq mi (32.16 km^{2})
  - Land: 12.26 sq mi (31.75 km^{2})
  - Water: 0.15 sq mi (0.40 km^{2})

Population (2020)
  - Total: 1,471 ▲
  - Estimate (2023): 1,476
  - Density: 113.2/sq mi (43.71/km^{2})
- Time zone: UTC-5 (Eastern (EST))
  - Summer (DST): UTC-4 (EDT)
- Area code: 570
- FIPS code: 42-107-40096

Kline Township is a township in Schuylkill County, Pennsylvania. The population was 1,471 at the 2020 census.

== Geography ==
According to the U.S. Census Bureau, the township has a total area of 12.4 square miles (32 km^{2}) of which 12.2 square miles (32 km^{2}) is land and 0.1 square miles (0.26 km^{2}) (1.13%) is water. It is drained by the Little Schuylkill River into the Schuylkill River, the Quakake Creek via the Black Creek into the Lehigh River, and the Catawissa Creek into the Susquehanna River. Its villages include Girard Manor (also in Delano and East Union Townships,) Haddock, Kelayres, Lofty, McAdoo Heights, and Silverbrook.

=== Neighboring municipalities ===
- Rush Township (south)
- Delano Township (south)
- East Union Township (northwest)
- Hazle Township, Luzerne County (north)
- Banks Township, Carbon County (east)
- McAdoo (almost surrounds to the east)
- Packer Township, Carbon County (east)

== Demographics ==
Historical population
| Census | Pop. | Note | %± |
|---|---|---|---|
| 2010 | 1,438 | | — |
| 2020 | 1,471 | | 2.3% |
| 2023 (est.) | 1,476 | | 0.3% |
U.S. Decennial Census

As of the census of 2000, there were 1,591 people, 691 households, and 467 families living in the township. The population density was 130.4 inhabitants per square mile (50.3/km^{2}). There were 738 housing units at an average density of 60.5 per square mile (23.4/km^{2}). The racial makeup of the township was 99.25% White, 0.19% Asian, 0.06% from other races, and 0.50% from two or more races. Hispanic or Latino of any race were 0.13% of the population.

There were 691 households, out of which 24.9% had children under the age of 18 living with them, 53.7% were married couples living together, 9.3% had a female householder with no husband present, and 32.4% were non-families. 30.2% of all households were made up of individuals, and 17.7% had someone living alone who was 65 years of age or older. The average household size was 2.30 and the average family size was 2.86.

In the township the population was spread out, with 19.2% under the age of 18, 6.0% from 18 to 24, 25.9% from 25 to 44, 26.6% from 45 to 64, and 22.3% who were 65 years of age or older. The median age was 44 years. For every 100 females, there were 93.1 males. For every 100 females age 18 and over, there were 91.2 males.

The median income for a household in the township was $30,188, and the median income for a family was $40,333. Males had a median income of $28,942 versus $21,078 for females. The per capita income for the township was $15,157. About 6.3% of families and 8.2% of the population were below the poverty line, including 10.6% of those under age 18 and 8.4% of those age 65 or over.

== Education ==
The Hazleton Area School District operates public schools, including the McAdoo-Kelayres Elementary-Middle School in McAdoo, which also serves the Kelayres area of Kline Township. All township residents are zoned to the Hazleton Area High School in Hazle Township.

== Transportation ==
Interstate 81 and Route 309 run north-to-south through Kline Township and PA 309 runs via downtown McAdoo. The two routes are connected by an access highway in Kline just south of McAdoo at exit 138 of I-81. STS bus route 45 provides service to the township from McAdoo via Tamaqua to Pottsville. On Saturdays, the Hometown auction bus 47 runs from Pottsville via Frackville, Shenandoah, and Mahanoy City to Hometown and McAdoo. Hazleton Public Transit bus route 20 serves the township via McAdoo to Kelayres.
