= Kelayres, Pennsylvania =

Unincorporated community in Pennsylvania, US

- Census-designated place
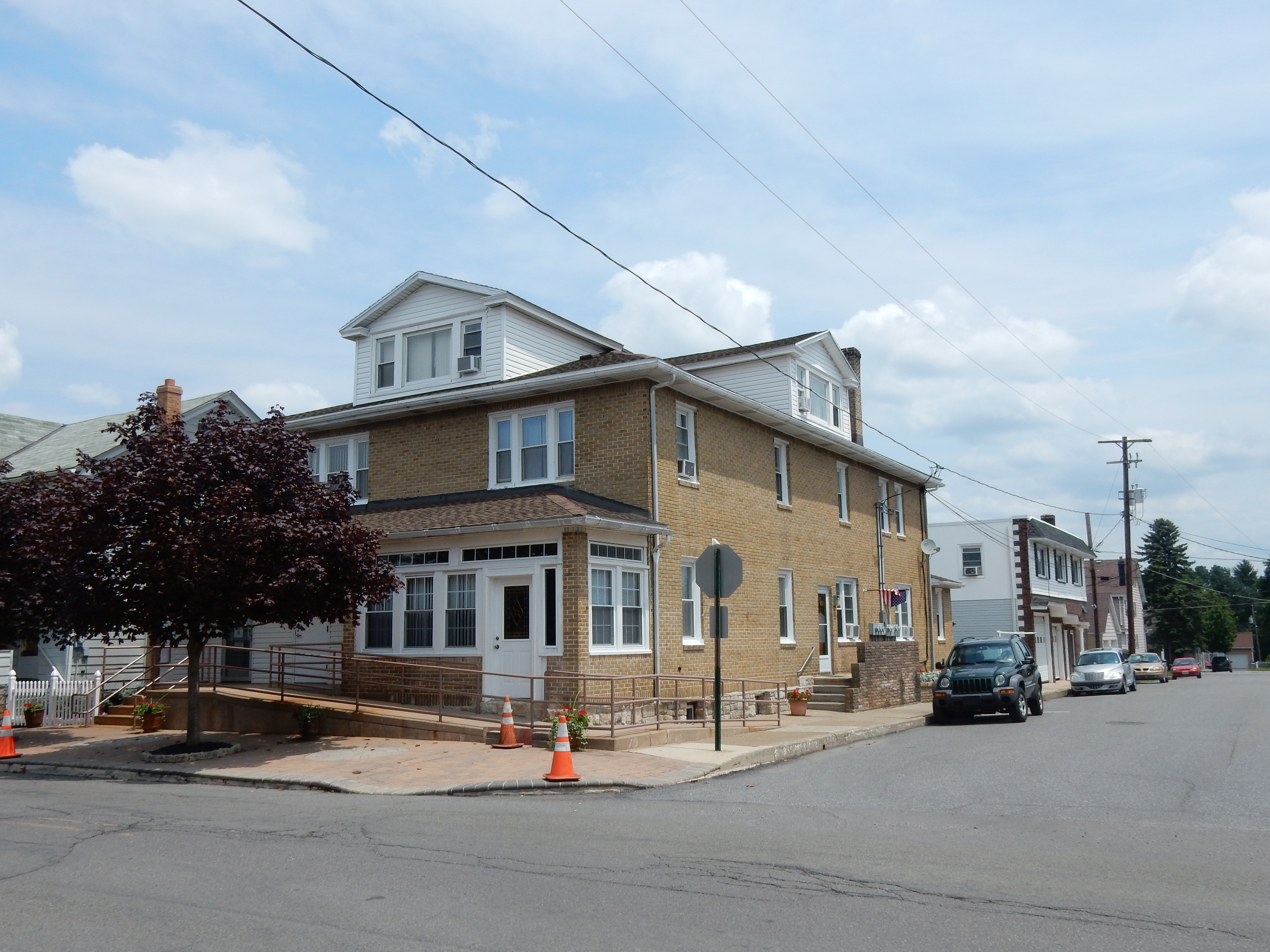
- Kelayres Post Office

- Location within Pennsylvania Location within the United States
- Coordinates: 40°54′03″N 76°00′13″W
- Country: United States
- State: Pennsylvania
- County: Schuylkill
- Township: Kline

Area
  - Total: 0.12 sq mi (0.30 km^{2})
  - Land: 0.12 sq mi (0.30 km^{2})
  - Water: 0 sq mi (0.00 km^{2})
- Elevation: 1,752 ft (534 m)

Population (2020)
  - Total: 497
  - Density: 4,340.1/sq mi (1,675.73/km^{2})
- Time zone: UTC-5 (Eastern (EST))
  - Summer (DST): UTC-4 (EDT)
- ZIP code: 18231
- Area codes: 570 and 272
- GNIS feature ID: 1178312

Kelayres is a census-designated place in Kline Township, Schuylkill County, Pennsylvania, United States on Broad Mountain, just west of McAdoo. Reservoir Number 8 is just west of Kelayres and drains northward into the Catawissa Creek, a tributary of the Susquehanna River. It is served by the Hazleton Area School District. The local pronunciation of the village is "Key-lar-es" and its ZIP code is 18231. As of the 2010 census the population was 533 residents. Kelayres is in area code 570, served by the 929 McAdoo exchange.

== Demographics ==
Historical population
Census	Pop.	Note	%±
2020	497		—
U.S. Decennial Census

== History ==
Kelayres achieved national notoriety in 1934 when local politics led to the Kelayres massacre, on election eve, November 5, 1934. Five people were killed, while at least one dozen were injured. The breaking story was played up for its political angle on election day. Local Republican boss Joseph James Bruno and six members of his immediate family were arrested and tried for the murders. Six received convictions and prison sentences. Bruno again achieved national notoriety when he escaped from jail in December 1936. He was recaptured in August 1937. They were all eventually pardoned, Joseph Bruno being the last of the family pardoned, on December 24, 1947.

== Education ==
The Hazleton Area School District covers the CDP. The district operates McAdoo-Kelayres Elementary-Middle School in McAdoo. All Kelayres residents are zoned to the Hazleton Area High School in Hazle Township.

== Transportation ==
Kelayres is the southern terminus of Hazleton Public Transit bus route 20. In McAdoo a connection may be made with Schuylkill Transportation System.
