= Audenried, Pennsylvania =

Unincorporated community in Pennsylvania, US

- Unincorporated community
- Location within Pennsylvania Location within the United States
- Coordinates: 40°54′38″N 75°59′30″W
- Country: United States
- State: Pennsylvania
- County: Carbon
- Township: Banks
- Elevation: 1,716 ft (523 m)
- Time zone: UTC-5 (Eastern (EST))
  - Summer (DST): UTC-4 (EDT)
- ZIP Codes: 18201, 18216
- Area codes: 570 and 272
- GNIS feature ID: 1168502

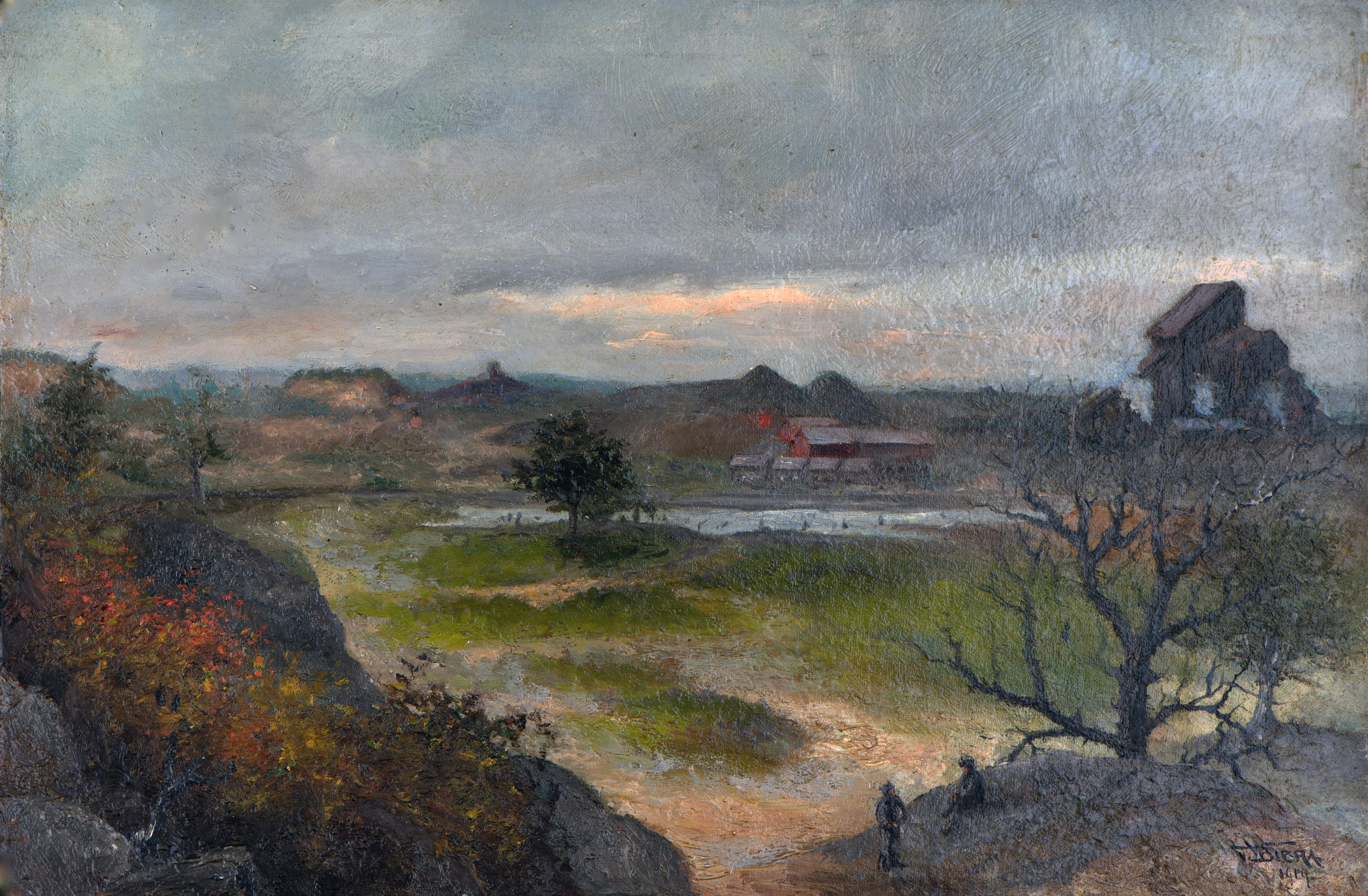
Audenried Breaker in 1919 by Wolfgang von Bibra

Audenried is a village in the northwest corner of Carbon County, Pennsylvania located on Route 309. It is located in Banks Township between Hazleton and McAdoo. It is served by the Hazleton Area School District. The Catawissa Creek starts in Audenried and flows westward to the Susquehanna River. The remainder of Carbon County is in the Delaware watershed.

Audenried is isolated from the remainder of Carbon County since travel by road between the two requires driving through Luzerne or Schuylkill County. The village is served by Hazleton Public Transit bus route 20, which runs via McAdoo to Kelayres. It is split between the Hazleton ZIP Code of 18201 and the Beaver Meadows ZIP code of 18216.
