= Tresckow, Pennsylvania =

Unincorporated community in Pennsylvania, US

- Census-designated place
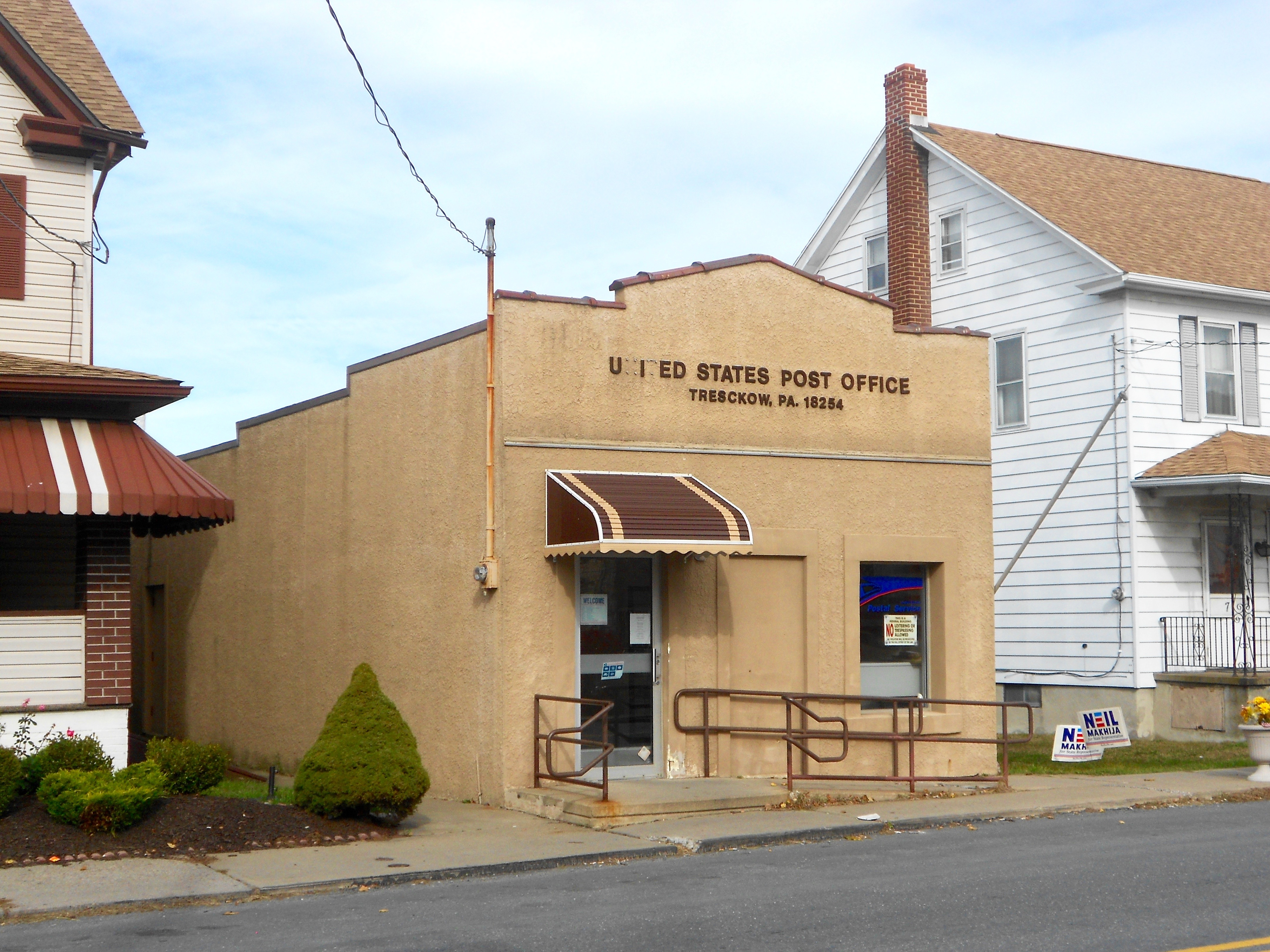
- Tresckow's post office

- Location of Tresckow in Pennsylvania Tresckow, Pennsylvania (the United States)
- Coordinates: 40°54′56″N 75°57′50″W
- Country: United States
- State: Pennsylvania
- County: Carbon
- Township: Banks

Area
  - Total: 1.8 sq mi (4.7 km^{2})
  - Land: 1.8 sq mi (4.7 km^{2})
  - Water: 0.0 sq mi (0 km^{2})
- Elevation: 1,778 ft (542 m)

Population (2010)
  - Total: 880
  - Density: 490/sq mi (190/km^{2})
- Time zone: UTC-5 (EST)
  - Summer (DST): UTC-4 (EDT)
- ZIP Code: 18254
- Area code: 570

Tresckow, formerly known as Dutchtown, is an unincorporated community and census-designated place (CDP) in Carbon County, Pennsylvania, United States. It is part of Northeastern Pennsylvania and is located west of Junedale and Beaver Meadows, which share the same road network. The community has deep roots in the anthracite coal mining and transportation industries.

== Geography ==
Tresckow is located in the western corner of Carbon County at 40°54′56″N 75°57′50″W (40.915631, -75.963881), at an elevation of 1,778 feet (542 m) on a hill lying between Spring Mountain to the south and Pismire Ridge to the north. The city of Hazleton is 3 miles (5 km) to the north in Luzerne County, and the borough of Beaver Meadows is 2 miles (3 km) to the east.

According to the U.S. Census Bureau, the CDP has a total area of 1.8 square miles (4.6 km^{2}), all of it land. While Tresckow has its own box post office with the ZIP code of 18254, surrounding areas use the Beaver Meadows ZIP code of 18216.

== Education ==
Residents of Tresckow live in Carbon County; however, they attend school in Luzerne County and are served by the Hazleton Area School District. Many go to the Hazleton Area High School, located 7 miles (11 km) away, or Marian Catholic High School, located 8 miles (13 km) away.

== Demographics ==
As of the census of 2000, there were 964 people, 384 households, and 276 families residing in the CDP. The population density was 530.3 inhabitants per square mile (204.7/km^{2}). There were 415 housing units at an average density of 228.3 per square mile (88.1/km^{2}). The racial makeup of the CDP was 99.48% White and 0.52% African American. Hispanic or Latino of any race were 0.83% of the population.

There were 384 households, out of which 25.0% had children under the age of 18 living with them, 56.0% were married couples living together, 10.9% had a female householder with no husband present, and 27.9% were non-families. 26.0% of all households were made up of individuals, and 13.8% had someone living alone who was 65 years of age or older. The average household size was 2.44 and the average family size was 2.92.

In the CDP, the population was spread out, with 20.7% under the age of 18, 5.5% from 18 to 24, 26.2% from 25 to 44, 24.1% from 45 to 64, and 23.4% who were 65 years of age or older. The median age was 43 years. For every 100 females, there were 94.4 males. For every 100 females age 18 and over, there were 90.0 males.

The median income for a household in the CDP was $35,625, and the median income for a family was $41,103. Males had a median income of $32,639 versus $26,364 for females. The per capita income for the CDP was $16,693. About 4.8% of families and 6.4% of the population were below the poverty line, including 6.1% of those under age 18 and 9.7% of those age 65 or over.
