= Bob Rinker =

American baseball player (1921-2002)

- Catcher
- Born: April 21, 1921; Audenried, Pennsylvania, U.S.
- Died: December 19, 2002 (aged 81); Hazleton, Pennsylvania, U.S.
- Batted: Right Threw: Right

MLB debut
- September 6, 1950, for the Philadelphia Athletics

Last MLB appearance
- September 16, 1950, for the Philadelphia Athletics

MLB statistics
- At bats: 3
- Hits: 1
- Home runs: 0
- Stats at Baseball Reference

Teams
- Philadelphia Athletics (1950)

Robert John Rinker (April 21, 1921 – December 19, 2002) was an American professional baseball player who appeared in three Major League games as a pinch hitter and catcher for the 1950 Philadelphia Athletics. The native of Audenried, Pennsylvania, batted and threw right-handed, stood 6 feet (1.8 m) tall and weighed 190 pounds (86 kg).

Rinker's professional career lasted three seasons, beginning in 1948 and ending immediately after his September 1950 audition with the Athletics in the waning days of Connie Mack's 50-year tenure as the team's manager.

Rinker was called up to the majors directly from the Class C Middle Atlantic League, where he had batted .381 in 126 at bats. In his debut game, on September 6, 1950 at Griffith Stadium, he pinch hit for A's pitcher Bobby Shantz in the eighth inning and singled off Sandy Consuegra of the Washington Senators. However, he was erased on a double play by Philadelphia's next batter, Eddie Joost. He would appear in two more games, one as a pinch hitter on September 8 and the other as a late-inning replacement for starting catcher Joe Tipton, and go hitless in two at bats, to finish with a Major League average of .333. He had no runs batted in.
