= 2012 Kansas City Chiefs season =

NFL team season

- Owner: The Hunt family (Clark Hunt Chairman and CEO)
- General manager: Scott Pioli
- Head coach: Romeo Crennel
- Offensive coordinator: Brian Daboll
- Home stadium: Arrowhead Stadium

Results
- Record: 2–14
- Division place: 4th AFC West
- Playoffs: Did not qualify
- All-Pros: 1: RB Jamaal Charles (2nd team)
- Pro Bowlers: 6: RB Jamaal Charles; LB Tamba Hali; LB Justin Houston; LB Derrick Johnson; S Eric Berry; P Dustin Colquitt
- Team MVP: Jamaal Charles
- Team ROY: Dontari Poe

Uniform
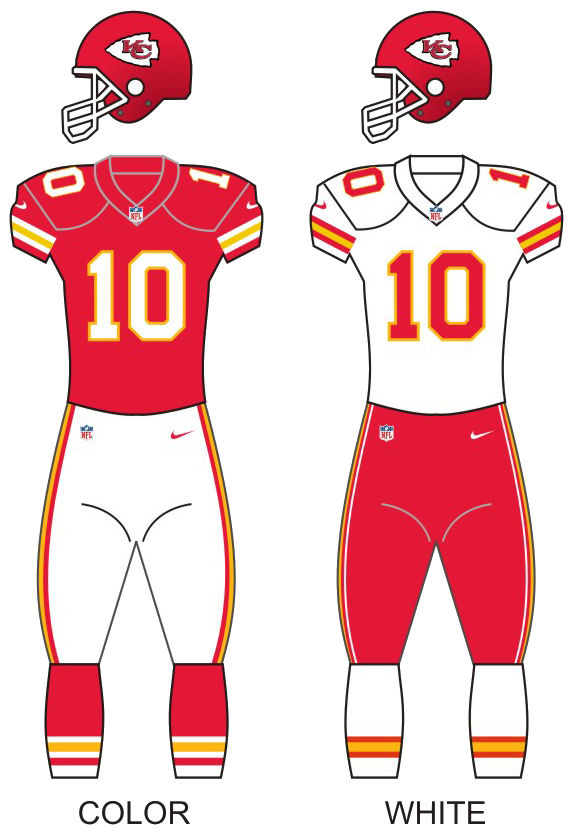

The 2012 season was the Kansas City Chiefs' 43rd in the National Football League (NFL), their 53rd overall and their first and only full season under head coach Romeo Crennel, who had served as the interim head coach for the final three games of the 2011 season following Todd Haley's termination. The Chiefs failed to rebound from their 7–9 record in 2011, and were eliminated from playoff contention in Week 12. Although they shared the same 2–14 record as the Jacksonville Jaguars for the worst record of the season, the Chiefs had a lower strength of schedule, so they were awarded the first pick in the 2013 NFL draft. The Chiefs went 0–12 against AFC opponents in 2012; their only wins of the season were from NFC teams, against the Carolina Panthers and New Orleans Saints. In 2017, ESPN.com named the 2012 season the Chiefs’ worst in franchise history. One of the few bright spots was Pro Bowl running back Jamaal Charles who rushed for over 1,500 yards and scored 5 touchdowns.

On December 1, 2012, the day before the Chiefs' week 13 game against the Carolina Panthers, linebacker Jovan Belcher murdered his girlfriend then drove to Arrowhead Stadium where he killed himself in front of Crennel and general manager Scott Pioli. The Chiefs held a moment of silence for domestic violence victims and the teams met for a prayer on the field prior to the game.

This was the last time the Chiefs finished with a losing record until 2025. It also remains the last time the Chiefs finished last in the AFC West.

== Season summary ==
The 2012 team tied the 1977 (2–12) and 2008 (2–14) teams for the franchise worst seasons in terms of fewest wins. The 2008 and 2012 seasons were the worst in terms of win percentage (.125) in franchise history.

They tied with the Jacksonville Jaguars for the NFL's worst record. The Chiefs had the number 1 pick in the 2013 National Football League draft based on strength of schedule. It was the second time in franchise history the Chiefs have had the #1 pick.

Kansas City suffered from quarterback controversy all season. The Chiefs were tied with the Arizona Cardinals for most interceptions (20) with Matt Cassel throwing 12 and his late season replacement Brady Quinn throwing 8.

The Chiefs started the season tying the 1929 record of Buffalo Bisons for most games without ever leading in regulation (8 games). The Chiefs did defeat the Saints in week 3, but didn't lead until their game winning field goal in overtime. The Chiefs broke the streak in Week 10 against the Pittsburgh Steelers when they led 10–0 in the second quarter before losing the game 16–13 in overtime. In Week 4, the Chiefs had six turnovers in a loss to San Diego. Chiefs tackle Eric Winston claimed Kansas City hometown fans cheered the injury of quarterback Matt Cassel in a Week 5 loss to the Baltimore Ravens calling it "Sick", however fans claim it was because Brady Quinn was seen coming onto the field and were cheering for him. Fans formed the "Save Our Chiefs" organization. They wore black to games to protest and hired an airplane to fly over Arrowhead Stadium on game days towing a banner that read, "Restore Hope: Fire Pioli." When asked why running back Jamaal Charles carried the ball only 5 times in a week 8 loss to the Oakland Raiders, Romeo Crennel responded "Now, that I'm not exactly sure, either." In Week 15, the Chiefs didn't have a first down until the third quarter in a loss against Oakland. In Week 16, the team rushed for a franchise record of 352 yards against the Colts and still lost the game. In Week 17, the Chiefs matched the 1981 Baltimore Colts season record of losing 9 games by 14 points or more in one season as the Chiefs lost to Denver.

The Chiefs finished near the bottom of the league in most major statistical categories. They were 23rd in total offense, 32nd in points scored, and 37 giveaways, tied for worst in the NFL. The Chiefs were 20th in total defense and 25th in points allowed. The Chiefs tied for the fewest takeaways with the Eagles. Their low forced turnovers and giveaways led the Chiefs to finish tied for the worst turnover differential in the NFL with a −24.

== Roster changes ==
=== Free agency ===
Kansas City Chiefs free agency
| Position | Player | Status* | 2011 team | 2012 team |
|---|---|---|---|---|
| CB | Mikail Baker | UFA | St. Louis Rams | Kansas City Chiefs |
| RB | Jackie Battle | UFA | Kansas City Chiefs | San Diego Chargers |
| TE | Anthony Becht | UFA | Kansas City Chiefs | None |
| LB | Jovan Belcher | RFA | Kansas City Chiefs | Kansas City Chiefs |
| TE | Kevin Boss | UFA | Oakland Raiders | Kansas City Chiefs |
| WR | Dwayne Bowe | UFA | Kansas City Chiefs | Kansas City Chiefs |
| CB | Brandon Carr | UFA | Kansas City Chiefs | Dallas Cowboys |
| CB | Travis Daniels | UFA | Kansas City Chiefs | Kansas City Chiefs |
| DE | Wallace Gilberry | UFA | Kansas City Chiefs | Tampa Bay Buccaneers |
| NT | Amon Gordon | UFA | Kansas City Chiefs | Kansas City Chiefs |
| NT | Kelly Gregg | UFA | Kansas City Chiefs | None |
| LB | Cory Greenwood | ERFA | Kansas City Chiefs | Kansas City Chiefs |
| RB | Peyton Hillis | UFA | Cleveland Browns | Kansas City Chiefs |
| RB | Thomas Jones | UFA | Kansas City Chiefs | None |
| S | Reshard Langford | UFA | Kansas City Chiefs | Detroit Lions |
| FB | LeRon McClain | UFA | Kansas City Chiefs | San Diego Chargers |
| S | Jon McGraw | UFA | Kansas City Chiefs | None |
| OT | Ryan O'Callaghan | UFA | Kansas City Chiefs | None |
| TE | Jake O'Connell | RFA | Kansas City Chiefs | Kansas City Chiefs |
| QB | Kyle Orton | UFA | Kansas City Chiefs | Dallas Cowboys |
| QB | Tyler Palko | UFA | Kansas City Chiefs | None |
| S | Sabby Piscitelli | UFA | Kansas City Chiefs | None |
| DE | Ropati Pitoitua | UFA | New York Jets | Kansas City Chiefs |
| TE | Leonard Pope | UFA | Kansas City Chiefs | Pittsburgh Steelers |
| QB | Brady Quinn | UFA | Denver Broncos | Kansas City Chiefs |
| CB | Jacques Reeves | UFA | Free Agent | Kansas City Chiefs |
| OT | Barry Richardson | UFA | Kansas City Chiefs | St. Louis Rams |
| CB | Stanford Routt | UFA | Oakland Raiders | Kansas City Chiefs |
| WR | Jerheme Urban | UFA | Kansas City Chiefs | None |
| C | Casey Wiegmann | UFA | Kansas City Chiefs | None |
| OT | Eric Winston | UFA | Houston Texans | Kansas City Chiefs |
*RFA: Restricted free agent, UFA: Unrestricted free agent, ERFA: Exclusive rights free agent, Franchise: Franchise tag

=== Draft ===
2012 Kansas City Chiefs draft
| Round | Pick | Player | Position | College | Notes |
| 1 | 11 | Dontari Poe * | DT | Memphis | |
| 2 | 44 | Jeff Allen | OT | Illinois | |
| 3 | 74 | Donald Stephenson | OT | Oklahoma | |
| 4 | 107 | Devon Wylie | WR | Fresno St | |
| 5 | 146 | DeQuan Menzie | CB | Alabama | |
| 6 | 182 | Cyrus Gray | RB | Texas A&M | |
| 7 | 218 | Jerome Long | DT | San Diego St | |
| 7 | 238 | Junior Hemingway | WR | Michigan | Pick from NE^{[a]} |
Made roster † Pro Football Hall of Fame * Made at least one Pro Bowl during career

Notes

^{^[a]} Acquired via trade with the New England Patriots for S Jarrad Page.

== Staff ==
2012 Kansas City Chiefs staff
| Front office: Chairman/CEO – Clark Hunt; President – Mark Donovan; General manager – Scott Pioli; Assistant general manager – Joel Collier; Director of pro personnel – Ray Farmer; Director of football administration – Trip MacCracken; Head coaches: Head coach/defensive coordinator – Romeo Crennel; Assistant head coach – Maurice Carthon; Offensive coaches: Offensive coordinator – Brian Daboll; Quarterbacks – Jim Zorn; Wide receivers – Nick Sirianni; Tight ends – Bernie Parmalee; Offensive line – Jack Bicknell, Jr.; Offensive quality control – Jim Bob Cooter | Defensive coaches: Defensive line – Anthony Pleasant; Linebackers – Gary Gibbs; Defensive backs – Emmitt Thomas; Defensive assistant/assistant linebackers – Adam Zimmer; Defensive quality control – Otis Smith; Pass rush – Joe Kim; Special teams coaches: Special teams – Tom McMahon; Special teams quality control – Derius Swinton II; Strength and conditioning: Strength and conditioning – Mike Clark; Assistant strength and conditioning – Brent Salazar |

== Final roster ==
2012 Kansas City Chiefs roster
| Quarterbacks (QB): 7 Matt Cassel; 9 Brady Quinn; 12 Ricky Stanzi; Running backs (RB): 25 Jamaal Charles; 49 Patrick DiMarco FB; 20 Shaun Draughn KR; 45 Nate Eachus FB; 32 Cyrus Gray; 40 Peyton Hillis; Wide receivers (WR): 89 Jon Baldwin; 11 Josh Bellamy; 15 Steve Breaston; 88 Junior Hemingway; 22 Dexter McCluster RS; 84 Jamar Newsome; 19 Devon Wylie; Tight ends (TE): 87 Steve Maneri; 81 Tony Moeaki | Offensive linemen (OL): 76 Branden Albert T; 71 Jeff Allen G; 73 Jon Asamoah G; 66 Russ Hochstein G; 65 Ryan Lilja C; 64 Bryan Mattison C; 67 Rich Ranglin G; 79 Donald Stephenson T; 74 Eric Winston T; Defensive linemen (DL): 94 Tyson Jackson DE; 75 Ropati Pitoitua DE; 92 Dontari Poe NT; 95 Jerrell Powe NT; 90 Shaun Smith DE; 98 Anthony Toribio NT | Linebackers (LB): 93 Cory Greenwood OLB; 91 Tamba Hali OLB; 50 Justin Houston OLB; 56 Derrick Johnson ILB; 99 Edgar Jones OLB; 52 Brandon Siler ILB; 96 Andy Studebaker OLB; 57 Leon Williams ILB; Defensive backs (DB): 21 Javier Arenas CB/RS; 29 Eric Berry SS; 30 Jalil Brown CB; 34 Travis Daniels CB; 27 Abram Elam FS; 24 Brandon Flowers CB; 31 Tysyn Hartman FS; 23 Kendrick Lewis FS; 38 Neiko Thorpe CB; Special teams (ST): 2 Dustin Colquitt P; 43 Thomas Gafford LS; 6 Ryan Succop K | Practice squad: 48 DeMarco Cosby TE; 26 Jose Gumbs S; 70 David Mims T; 77 Luke Patterson T (IR); 55 Quan Sturdivant LB; 14 Matt Szymanski P; 68 Dustin Waldron G; Reserve: 97 Allen Bailey DE (IR); 80 Kevin Boss TE (IR); 82 Dwayne Bowe WR (IR); 10 Terrance Copper WR (IR); 72 Glenn Dorsey DE (IR); 61 Rodney Hudson C (IR); 41 Kyle McCarthy SS (IR); 49 DeQuan Menzie CB (IR); 85 Jake O'Connell TE (IR); 83 Martin Rucker TE (IR); 4 Alex Tanney QB (IR); Rookies in italics 53 active, 12 reserve, 6 practice squad |

== Preseason ==
=== Schedule ===
| Week | Date | Opponent | Result | Record | Venue | Recap |
|---|---|---|---|---|---|---|
| 1 | August 10 | Arizona Cardinals | W 27–17 | 1–0 | Arrowhead Stadium | Recap |
| 2 | August 18 | at St. Louis Rams | L 17–31 | 1–1 | Edward Jones Dome | Recap |
| 3 | August 24 | Seattle Seahawks | L 14–44 | 1–2 | Arrowhead Stadium | Recap |
| 4 | August 30 | at Green Bay Packers | L 3–24 | 1–3 | Lambeau Field | Recap |

=== Game summaries ===
==== Week 1: vs. Arizona Cardinals ====
Week 1: Arizona Cardinals at Kansas City Chiefs – Game summary

| Quarter | 1 | 2 | 3 | 4 | Total |
|---|---|---|---|---|---|
| Cardinals | 0 | 3 | 7 | 7 | 17 |
| Chiefs | 14 | 3 | 3 | 7 | 27 |

at Arrowhead Stadium, Kansas City, Missouri

- Date: August 10
- Game time: 7:00 p.m. CDT
- Game weather: Sunny, 82 °F (28 °C)
- Game attendance: 64,212
- Referee: Ken Roan
- Recap, Game Book

Game information

First quarter

- KC – Peyton Hillis 11-yard pass from Matt Cassel (Ryan Succop kick), 8:09. Chiefs 7–0. Drive: 12 plays, 72 yards, 6:51.
- KC – Shaun Draughn 4-yard run (Ryan Succop kick), 4:13. Chiefs 14–0. Drive: 4 plays, 72 yards, 1:45.

Second quarter

- KC – Ryan Succop 22-yard field goal, 11:20. Chiefs 17–0. Drive: 4 plays, 33 yards, 1:40.
- ARI – Jay Feely 40-yard field goal, 0:02. Chiefs 17–3. Drive: 5 plays, 39 yards, 0:30.

Third quarter

- ARI – William Powell 2-yard run (Jay Feely kick), 10:32. Chiefs 17–10. Drive: 9 plays, 80 yards, 4:28.
- KC – Ryan Succop 24-yard field goal, 4:33. Chiefs 20–10. Drive: 4 plays, 8 yards, 1:19.

Fourth quarter

- KC – Cyrus Gray 7-yard run (Ryan Succop kick), 13:31. Chiefs 27–10. Drive: 5 plays, 46 yards, 1:58.
- ARI – Jaymar Johnson 18-yard pass from Richard Bartel (Jay Feely kick), 8:28. Chiefs 27–17. Drive: 5 plays, 62 yards, 2:10.

Top passers

- ARI – Richard Bartel – 5/6, 69 yards, TD
- KC – Brady Quinn – 7/13, 81 yards, INT

Top rushers

- ARI – William Powell – 9 rushes, 92 yards, TD
- KC – Cyrus Gray – 15 rushes, 65 yards, TD

Top receivers

- ARI – LaRon Byrd – 3 receptions, 33 yards
- KC – Steve Maneri – 3 receptions, 69 yards

==== Week 2: at St. Louis Rams ====
Week 2: Kansas City Chiefs at St. Louis Rams – Game summary

| Quarter | 1 | 2 | 3 | 4 | Total |
|---|---|---|---|---|---|
| Chiefs | 0 | 10 | 0 | 7 | 17 |
| Rams | 14 | 3 | 7 | 7 | 31 |

at Edward Jones Dome, St. Louis, Missouri

- Date: August 18
- Game time: 7:00 p.m. CDT
- Game weather: None (indoor stadium)
- Game attendance: 53,372
- Referee: Matt Nicks
- Recap, Game Book

Game information

First quarter

- STL – Lance Kendricks 23-yard pass from Sam Bradford (Greg Zuerlein kick), 13:02. Rams 7–0. Drive: 4 plays, 80 yards, 1:58.
- STL – Danny Amendola 8-yard pass from Sam Bradford (Greg Zuerlein kick), 10:01. Rams 14–0. Drive: 5 plays, 31 yards, 2:18.

Second quarter

- KC – Peyton Hillis 1-yard run (Ryan Succop kick), 10:29. Rams 14–7. Drive: 10 plays, 80 yards, 4:59.
- STL – Greg Zuerlein 52-yard field goal, 1:10. Rams 17–7. Drive: 10 plays, 52 yards, 5:07.
- KC – Ryan Succop 44-yard field goal, 0:03. Rams 17–10. Drive: 7 plays, 54 yards, 1:07.

Third quarter

- STL – Isaiah Pead 1-yard run (Greg Zuerlein kick), 11:26. Rams 24–10. Drive: 5 plays, 18 yards, 2:41.

Fourth quarter

- STL – Daryl Richardson 4-yard run (Greg Zuerlein kick), 12:51. Rams 31–10. Drive: 7 plays, 57 yards, 3:17.
- KC – Jeremy Horne 38-yard pass from Brady Quinn (Ryan Succop kick), 3:51. Rams 31–17. Drive: 5 plays, 60 yards, 2:58.

Top passers

- KC – Matt Cassel – 13/18, 142 yards
- STL – Sam Bradford – 6/9, 102 yards, 2 TD

Top rushers

- KC – Shaun Draughn – 7 rushes, 21 yards
- STL – Steven Jackson – 7 rushes, 49 yards

Top receivers

- KC – Kevin Boss – 4 receptions, 62 yards
- STL – Danny Amendola – 3 receptions, 58 yards, TD

==== Week 3: vs. Seattle Seahawks ====
Week 3: Seattle Seahawks at Kansas City Chiefs – Game summary

| Quarter | 1 | 2 | 3 | 4 | Total |
|---|---|---|---|---|---|
| Seahawks | 6 | 17 | 21 | 0 | 44 |
| Chiefs | 0 | 7 | 0 | 7 | 14 |

at Arrowhead Stadium, Kansas City, Missouri

- Date: August 24
- Game time: 7:00 p.m. CDT
- Game weather: Cloudy, 85 °F (29 °C)
- Game attendance: 63,870
- Referee: Craig Ochoa
- Recap, Game Book

Game information

First quarter

- SEA – Stephen Hauschka 36-yard field goal, 7:29. Seahawks 3–0. Drive: 12 plays, 41 yards, 5:25.
- SEA – Stephen Hauschka 39-yard field goal, 1:55. Seahawks 6–0. Drive: 7 plays, 59 yards, 3:00.

Second quarter

- SEA – Stephen Hauschka 45-yard field goal, 12:44. Seahawks 9–0. Drive: 7 plays, 37 yards, 3:15.
- SEA – Kellen Winslow II 21-yard pass from Russell Wilson (Stephen Hauschka kick), 9:43. Seahawks 16–0. Drive: 3 plays, 62 yards, 0:46.
- KC – Dexter McCluster 9-yard pass from Matt Cassel (Ryan Succop kick), 2:00. Seahawks 16–7. Drive: 17 plays, 80 yards, 7:43.
- SEA – Charly Martin 11-yard pass from Russell Wilson (Stephen Hauschka kick), 0:30. Seahawks 23–7. Drive: 7 plays, 80 yards, 1:30.

Third quarter

- SEA – Robert Turbin 25-yard run (Stephen Hauschka kick), 13:14. Seahawks 30–7. Drive: 4 plays, 80 yards, 1:46.
- SEA – Earl Thomas 75-yard interception return (Stephen Hauschka kick), 4:48. Seahawks 37–7.
- SEA – Golden Tate 92-yard punt return (Stephen Hauschka kick), 2:12. Seahawks 44–7.

Fourth quarter

- KC – Nate Eachus 7-yard run (Ryan Succop kick), 1:53. Seahawks 44–14. Drive: 12 plays, 97 yards, 6:48.

Top passers

- SEA – Russell Wilson – 13/19, 185 yards, 2 TD
- KC – Matt Cassel – 19/34, 168 yards, TD, INT

Top rushers

- SEA – Robert Turbin – 14 rushes, 93 yards, TD
- KC – Nate Eachus – 10 rushes, 98 yards, TD

Top receivers

- SEA – Anthony McCoy – 2 receptions, 47 yards
- KC – Dexter McCluster – 7 receptions, 61 yards, TD

==== Week 4: at Green Bay Packers ====
Week 4: Kansas City Chiefs at Green Bay Packers – Game summary

| Quarter | 1 | 2 | 3 | 4 | Total |
|---|---|---|---|---|---|
| Chiefs | 3 | 0 | 0 | 0 | 3 |
| Packers | 0 | 14 | 7 | 3 | 24 |

at Lambeau Field, Green Bay, Wisconsin

- Date: August 30
- Game time: 7:00 p.m. CDT
- Game weather: Clear, 87 °F (31 °C)
- Game attendance: 67,999
- Referee: Wayne Elliott
- Recap, Game Book

Game information

First quarter

- KC – Ryan Succop 26-yard field goal, 2:11. Chiefs 3–0. Drive: 12 plays, 75 yards, 6:04.

Second quarter

- GB – Alex Green 2-yard run (Mason Crosby kick), 7:33. Packers 7–3. Drive: 6 plays, 80 yards, 3:22.
- GB – Alex Green 17-yard pass from Graham Harrell (Mason Crosby kick), 0:50. Packers 14–3. Drive: 10 plays, 93 yards, 4:37.

Third quarter

- GB – Jarrett Boykin 12-yard pass from Graham Harrell (Mason Crosby kick), 10:12. Packers 21–3. Drive: 7 plays, 77 yards, 6:48.

Fourth quarter

- GB – Mason Crosby 37-yard field goal, 14:52. Packers 24–3. Drive: 12 plays, 59 yards, 6:00.

Top passers

- KC – Brady Quinn – 6/12, 83 yards, INT
- GB – Graham Harrell – 13/15, 223 yards, 2 TD

Top rushers

- KC – Nate Eachus – 21 rushes, 99 yards
- GB – Marc Tyler – 12 rushes, 21 yards

Top receivers

- KC – Jake O'Connell – 2 receptions, 21 yards
- GB – Jarrett Boykin – 5 receptions, 82 yards, TD

== Regular season ==
=== Schedule ===
| Week | Date | Opponent | Result | Record | Venue | Recap |
|---|---|---|---|---|---|---|
| 1 | September 9 | Atlanta Falcons | **L** 24–40 | 0–1 | Arrowhead Stadium | Recap |
| 2 | September 16 | at Buffalo Bills | **L** 17–35 | 0–2 | Ralph Wilson Stadium | Recap |
| 3 | September 23 | at New Orleans Saints | **W** 27–24 (OT) | 1–2 | Mercedes-Benz Superdome | Recap |
| 4 | September 30 | **San Diego Chargers** | **L** 20–37 | 1–3 | Arrowhead Stadium | Recap |
| 5 | October 7 | Baltimore Ravens | **L** 6–9 | 1–4 | Arrowhead Stadium | Recap |
| 6 | October 14 | at Tampa Bay Buccaneers | **L** 10–38 | 1–5 | Raymond James Stadium | Recap |
| 7 | Bye | | | | | |
| 8 | October 28 | **Oakland Raiders** | **L** 16–26 | 1–6 | Arrowhead Stadium | Recap |
| 9 | November 1 | at **San Diego Chargers** | **L** 13–31 | 1–7 | Qualcomm Stadium | Recap |
| 10 | November 12 | at Pittsburgh Steelers | **L** 13–16 (OT) | 1–8 | Heinz Field | Recap |
| 11 | November 18 | Cincinnati Bengals | **L** 6–28 | 1–9 | Arrowhead Stadium | Recap |
| 12 | November 25 | **Denver Broncos** | **L** 9–17 | 1–10 | Arrowhead Stadium | Recap |
| 13 | December 2 | Carolina Panthers | **W** 27–21 | 2–10 | Arrowhead Stadium | Recap |
| 14 | December 9 | at Cleveland Browns | **L** 7–30 | 2–11 | Cleveland Browns Stadium | Recap |
| 15 | December 16 | at **Oakland Raiders** | **L** 0–15 | 2–12 | O.co Coliseum | Recap |
| 16 | December 23 | Indianapolis Colts | **L** 13–20 | 2–13 | Arrowhead Stadium | Recap |
| 17 | December 30 | at **Denver Broncos** | **L** 3–38 | 2–14 | Sports Authority Field at Mile High | Recap |

Note: Intra-division opponents are in bold text.

=== Game summaries ===
==== Week 1: vs. Atlanta Falcons ====
Week 1: Atlanta Falcons at Kansas City Chiefs – Game summary

| Quarter | 1 | 2 | 3 | 4 | Total |
|---|---|---|---|---|---|
| **Falcons** | 10 | 10 | 14 | 6 | **40** |
| Chiefs | 3 | 14 | 0 | 7 | **24** |

at Arrowhead Stadium, Kansas City, Missouri

- Date: September 9
- Game time: 12:00 p.m. CDT
- Game weather: Sunny and clear, 69 °F (21 °C)
- Game attendance: 71,180
- Referee: Mike Shepherd
- TV announcers (Fox): Thom Brennaman, Brian Billick and Laura Okmin
- Recap, Game Book

Game information

**First quarter**

- ATL – Julio Jones 8-yard pass from Matt Ryan (Matt Bryant kick), 8:51. Falcons 7–0. **Drive: 12 plays, 80 yards, 6:09.**
- KC – Ryan Succop 39-yard field goal, 4:02. Falcons 7–3. **Drive: 11 plays, 56 yards, 4:49.**
- ATL – Matt Bryant 34-yard field goal, 1:57. Falcons 10–3. **Drive: 4 plays, 8 yards, 2:05.**

**Second quarter**

- KC – Kevin Boss 22-yard pass from Matt Cassel (Ryan Succop kick), 11:39. Tied 10–10. **Drive: 9 plays, 76 yards, 5:18.**
- ATL – Julio Jones 14-yard pass from Matt Ryan (Matt Bryant kick), 7:48. Falcons 17–10. **Drive: 8 plays, 73 yards, 3:51.**
- KC – Matt Cassel 5-yard run (Ryan Succop kick), 3:38. Tied 17–17. **Drive: 8 plays, 80 yards, 4:10.**
- ATL – Matt Bryant 21-yard field goal, 0:10. Falcons 20–17. **Drive: 11 plays, 77 yards, 3:28.**

**Third quarter**

- ATL – Matt Ryan 5-yard run (Matt Bryant kick), 4:54. Falcons 27–17. **Drive: 9 plays, 70 yards, 4:13.**
- ATL – Tony Gonzalez 7-yard pass from Matt Ryan (Matt Bryant kick), 3:56. Falcons 34–17. **Drive: 1 play, 7 yards, 0:06.**

**Fourth quarter**

- ATL – Matt Bryant 30-yard field goal, 14:13. Falcons 37–17. **Drive: 5 plays, 31 yards, 2:07.**
- ATL – Matt Bryant 41-yard field goal, 10:40. Falcons 40–17. **Drive: 4 plays, 8 yards, 2:04.**
- KC – Shaun Draughn 4-yard run (Ryan Succop kick), 0:05. Falcons 40–24. **Drive: 11 plays, 73 yards, 2:56.**

**Top passers**

- ATL – Matt Ryan – 23/31, 299 yards, 3 TD
- KC – Matt Cassel – 21/33, 258 yards, TD, 2 INT

**Top rushers**

- ATL – Michael Turner – 11 rushes, 32 yards
- KC – Jamaal Charles – 16 rushes, 87 yards

**Top receivers**

- ATL – Julio Jones – 6 receptions, 108 yards, 2 TD
- KC – Dexter McCluster – 6 receptions, 82 yards

==== Week 2: at Buffalo Bills ====
Week 2: Kansas City Chiefs at Buffalo Bills – Game summary

| Quarter | 1 | 2 | 3 | 4 | Total |
|---|---|---|---|---|---|
| Chiefs | 0 | 0 | 3 | 14 | **17** |
| **Bills** | 7 | 14 | 14 | 0 | **35** |

at Ralph Wilson Stadium, Orchard Park, New York

- Date: September 16
- Game time: 1:00 p.m. EDT/12:00 p.m. CDT
- Game weather: Mostly sunny, 66 °F (19 °C)
- Game attendance: 69,402
- Referee: Robert Dalton
- TV announcers (CBS): Spero Dedes and Steve Beuerlein
- Recap, Game Book

Game information

**First quarter**

- BUF – C. J. Spiller 17-yard run (Rian Lindell kick), 2:01. Bills 7–0. **Drive: 11 plays, 84 yards, 5:52.**

**Second quarter**

- BUF – C. J. Spiller 5-yard run (Rian Lindell kick), 12:29. Bills 14–0. **Drive: 7 plays, 67 yards, 2:55.**
- BUF – Scott Chandler 10-yard pass from Ryan Fitzpatrick (Rian Lindell kick), 3:29. Bills 21–0. **Drive: 6 plays, 43 yards, 3:29.**

**Third quarter**

- KC – Ryan Succop 33-yard field goal, 7:32. Bills 21–3. **Drive: 7 plays, 23 yards, 3:33.**
- BUF – Stevie Johnson 49-yard pass from Ryan Fitzpatrick (Ryan Lindell kick), 5:35. Bills 28–3. **Drive: 4 plays, 80 yards, 1:57.**
- BUF – Leodis McKelvin 88-yard punt return (Ryan Lindell kick), 3:46. Bills 35–3.

**Fourth quarter**

- KC – Dwayne Bowe 33-yard pass from Matt Cassel (Ryan Succop kick), 6:26. Bills 35–10. **Drive: 5 plays, 80 yards, 2:13.**
- KC – Dwayne Bowe 2-yard pass from Matt Cassel (Ryan Succop kick), 1:10. Bills 35–17. **Drive: 9 plays, 83 yards, 2:51.**

**Top passers**

- KC – Matt Cassel – 23/42, 301 yards, 2 TD, INT
- BUF – Ryan Fitzpatrick – 10/19, 178 yards, 2 TD

**Top rushers**

- KC – Peyton Hillis – 11 rushes, 66 yards
- BUF – C. J. Spiller – 15 rushes, 123 yards, 2 TD

**Top receivers**

- KC – Dwayne Bowe – 8 receptions, 102 yards, 2 TD
- BUF – Stevie Johnson – 2 receptions, 56 yards, TD

==== Week 3: at New Orleans Saints ====
Week 3: Kansas City Chiefs at New Orleans Saints – Game summary

| Quarter | 1 | 2 | 3 | 4 | OT | Total |
|---|---|---|---|---|---|---|
| **Chiefs** | 3 | 3 | 7 | 11 | 3 | **27** |
| Saints | 7 | 3 | 14 | 0 | 0 | **24** |

at Mercedes-Benz Superdome, New Orleans, Louisiana

- Date: September 23
- Game time: 12:00 p.m. CDT
- Game weather: None (indoor stadium)
- Game attendance: 72,226
- Referee: Don King
- TV announcers (CBS): Greg Gumbel and Dan Dierdorf
- Recap, Game Book

Game information

**First quarter**

- NO – Lance Moore 9-yard pass from Drew Brees (Garrett Hartley kick), 12:18. Saints 7–0. **Drive: 6 plays, 83 yards, 2:42.**
- KC – Ryan Succop 25-yard field goal, 4:51. Saints 7–3. **Drive: 14 plays, 82 yards, 7:27.**

**Second quarter**

- NO – Garrett Hartley 40-yard field goal, 14:55. Saints 10–3. **Drive: 10 plays, 65 yards, 4:56.**
- KC – Ryan Succop 45-yard field goal, 4:41. Saints 10–6. **Drive: 5 plays, 18 yards, 1:34.**

**Third quarter**

- NO – Jimmy Graham 1-yard pass from Drew Brees (Garrett Hartley kick), 13:10. Saints 17–6. **Drive: 5 plays, 19 yards, 1:41.**
- NO – Jed Collins 6-yard pass from Drew Brees (Garrett Hartley kick), 5:36. Saints 24–6. **Drive: 2 plays, 7 yards, 0:45.**
- KC – Jamaal Charles 91-yard run (Ryan Succop kick), 5:18. Saints 24–13. **Drive: 1 play, 91 yards, 0:18.**

**Fourth quarter**

- KC – Ryan Succop 34-yard field goal, 13:40. Saints 24–16. **Drive: 8 plays, 52 yards, 3:48.**
- KC – Ryan Succop 38-yard field goal, 9:11. Saints 24–19. **Drive: 9 plays, 50 yards, 3:32.**
- KC – Drew Brees sacked in end zone by Justin Houston for a Safety, 5:33. Saints 24–21.
- KC – Ryan Succop 43-yard field goal, 0:03. Tied 24–24. **Drive: 13 plays, 37 yards, 5:30.**

**Overtime**

- KC – Ryan Succop 31-yard field goal, 6:27. Chiefs 27–24. **Drive: 12 plays, 40 yards, 5:19.**

**Top passers**

- KC – Matt Cassel – 26/44, 248 yards, INT
- NO – Drew Brees – 20/36, 240 yards, 3 TD, INT

**Top rushers**

- KC – Jamaal Charles – 33 rushes, 233 yards, TD
- NO – Darren Sproles – 7 rushes, 62 yards

**Top receivers**

- KC – Dwayne Bowe – 7 receptions, 79 yards
- NO – Lance Moore – 4 receptions, 40 yards, TD

==== Week 4: vs. San Diego Chargers ====
Week 4: San Diego Chargers at Kansas City Chiefs – Game summary

| Quarter | 1 | 2 | 3 | 4 | Total |
|---|---|---|---|---|---|
| **Chargers** | 17 | 10 | 0 | 10 | **37** |
| Chiefs | 0 | 6 | 7 | 7 | **20** |

at Arrowhead Stadium, Kansas City, Missouri

- Date: September 30
- Game time: 12:00 p.m. CDT
- Game weather: Cloudy, 67 °F (19 °C)
- Game attendance: 69,979
- Referee: Bill Leavy
- TV announcers (CBS): Kevin Harlan and Solomon Wilcots
- Recap, Game Book

Game information

**First quarter**

- SD – Eddie Royal 4-yard pass from Philip Rivers (Nick Novak kick), 10:04. Chargers 7–0. **Drive: 9 plays, 76 yards, 4:56.**
- SD – Nick Novak 24-yard field goal, 6:26. Chargers 10–0. **Drive: 5 plays, 22 yards, 2:13.**
- SD – Jackie Battle 1 yard run (Nick Novak kick), 5:28. Chargers 17–0. **Drive: 2 plays, 5 yards, 0:44.**

**Second quarter**

- SD – Nick Novak 47-yard field goal, 8:09. Chargers 20–0. **Drive: 6 plays, 42 yards, 3:47.**
- KC – Jamaal Charles 37-yard run (pass failed), 5:09. Chargers 20–6. **Drive: 5 plays, 85 yards, 2:19.**
- SD – Donald Butler 21-yard interception return (Nick Novak kick), 2:51. Chargers 27–6.

**Third quarter**

- KC – Jamaal Charles 13-yard pass from Matt Cassel (Ryan Succop kick), 8:40. Chargers 27–13. **Drive: 13 plays, 80 yards, 6:20.**

**Fourth quarter**

- SD – Jackie Battle 4-yard pass from Philip Rivers (Nick Novak kick), 7:59. Chargers 34–13. **Drive: 9 plays, 49 yards, 5:31.**
- KC – Dwayne Bowe 29-yard pass from Matt Cassel (Ryan Succop kick), 5:29. Chargers 34–20. **Drive: 7 plays, 71 yards, 2:25.**
- SD – Nick Novak 45-yard field goal, 1:56. Chargers 37–20. **Drive: 9 plays, 53 yards, 3:33.**

**Top passers**

- SD – Philip Rivers – 18/23, 209 yards, 2 TD, INT
- KC – Matt Cassel – 24/42, 251 yards, 2 TD, 3 INT

**Top rushers**

- SD – Ryan Mathews – 14 rushes, 61 yards
- KC – Jamaal Charles – 17 rushes, 88 yards, TD

**Top receivers**

- SD – Antonio Gates – 3 receptions, 59 yards
- KC – Dwayne Bowe – 7 receptions, 108 yards, TD

==== Week 5: vs. Baltimore Ravens ====
Week 5: Baltimore Ravens at Kansas City Chiefs – Game summary

| Quarter | 1 | 2 | 3 | 4 | Total |
|---|---|---|---|---|---|
| **Ravens** | 3 | 0 | 6 | 0 | **9** |
| Chiefs | 0 | 3 | 0 | 3 | **6** |

at Arrowhead Stadium, Kansas City, Missouri

- Date: October 7
- Game time: 12:00 p.m. CDT
- Game weather: Sunny, 47 °F (8 °C)
- Game attendance: 68,803
- Referee: Pete Morelli
- TV announcers (CBS): Ian Eagle and Dan Fouts
- Recap, Game Book

Game information

**First quarter**

- BAL – Justin Tucker 28-yard field goal, 1:21. Ravens 3–0. **Drive: 6 plays, 32 yards, 1:49.**

**Second quarter**

- KC – Ryan Succop 30-yard field goal, 2:48. Tied 3–3. **Drive: 13 plays, 53 yards, 6:13.**

**Third quarter**

- BAL – Justin Tucker 26-yard field goal, 8:00. Ravens 6–3. **Drive: 7 plays, 80 yards, 3:41.**
- BAL – Justin Tucker 39-yard field goal, 0:00. Ravens 9–3. **Drive: 9 plays, 56 yards, 3:48.**

**Fourth quarter**

- KC – Ryan Succop 31-yard field goal, 4:31. Ravens 9–6. **Drive: 11 plays, 57 yards, 5:44.**

**Top passers**

- BAL – Joe Flacco – 13/27, 187 yards, INT
- KC – Matt Cassel – 9/15, 92 yards, 2 INT

**Top rushers**

- BAL – Ray Rice – 17 rushes, 102 yards
- KC – Jamaal Charles – 31 rushes, 140 yards

**Top receivers**

- BAL – Anquan Boldin – 4 receptions, 82 yards
- KC – Dwayne Bowe – 6 receptions, 60 yards

==== Week 6: at Tampa Bay Buccaneers ====
Week 6: Kansas City Chiefs at Tampa Bay Buccaneers – Game summary

| Quarter | 1 | 2 | 3 | 4 | Total |
|---|---|---|---|---|---|
| Chiefs | 0 | 3 | 0 | 7 | **10** |
| **Buccaneers** | 7 | 0 | 14 | 17 | **38** |

at Raymond James Stadium, Tampa, Florida

- Date: October 14
- Game time: 1:00 p.m. EDT/12:00 p.m. CDT
- Game weather: Sunny, 85 °F (29 °C)
- Game attendance: 46,500
- Referee: Walt Coleman
- TV announcers (CBS): Marv Albert and Rich Gannon
- Recap, Game Book

Game information

**First quarter**

- TB – Mike Williams 62-yard pass from Josh Freeman (Connor Barth kick), 0:18. Buccaneers 7–0. **Drive: 1 play, 62 yards, 0:12.**

**Second quarter**

- KC – Ryan Succop 38-yard field goal, 7:45. Buccaneers 7–3. **Drive: 15 plays, 59 yards, 7:33.**

**Third quarter**

- TB – Vincent Jackson 19-yard pass from Josh Freeman (Connor Bart kick), 12:46. Buccaneers 14–3. **Drive: 4 plays, 80 yards, 2:14.**
- TB – Ronde Barber 78-yard interception return (Connor Barth kick), 9:36. Buccaneers 21–3.

**Fourth quarter**

- KC – Edgar Jones 11-yard fumble return (Ryan Succop kick), 14:01. Buccaneers 21–10.
- TB – Connor Barth 27-yard field goal, 10:34. Buccaneers 24–10. **Drive: 7 plays, 69 yards, 3:27.**
- TB – Vincent Jackson 17-yard pass from Josh Freeman (Connor Barth kick), 6:43. Buccaneers 31–10. **Drive: 5 plays, 85 yards, 2:46.**
- TB – LeGarrette Blount 12-yard run (Connor Barth kick), 1:53. Buccaneers 38–10. **Drive: 5 plays, 53 yards, 2:41.**

**Top passers**

- KC – Brady Quinn – 22/38, 180 yards, 2 INT
- TB – Josh Freeman – 15/26, 328 yards, 3 TD, INT

**Top rushers**

- KC – Jamaal Charles – 12 rushes, 40 yards
- TB – Doug Martin – 13 rushes, 76 yards

**Top receivers**

- KC – Steve Maneri – 4 receptions, 41 yards
- TB – Mike Williams – 4 receptions, 113 yards, TD

==== Week 8: vs. Oakland Raiders ====
Week 8: Oakland Raiders at Kansas City Chiefs – Game summary

| Quarter | 1 | 2 | 3 | 4 | Total |
|---|---|---|---|---|---|
| **Raiders** | 3 | 10 | 10 | 3 | **26** |
| Chiefs | 0 | 6 | 3 | 7 | **16** |

at Arrowhead Stadium, Kansas City, Missouri

- Date: October 28
- Game time: 3:05 p.m. CDT
- Game weather: Sunny, 50 °F (10 °C)
- Game attendance: 74,730
- Referee: Bill Vinovich
- TV announcers (CBS): Kevin Harlan and Solomon Wilcots
- Recap, Game Book

Game information

**First quarter**

- OAK – Sebastian Janikowski 36-yard field goal, 9:51. Raiders 3–0. **Drive: 8 plays, 76 yards, 3:43.**

**Second quarter**

- OAK – Sebastian Janikowski 35-yard field goal, 14:44. Raiders 6–0. **Drive: 8 plays, 28 yards, 2:43.**
- KC – Ryan Succop 30-yard field goal, 10:21. Raiders 6–3. **Drive: 8 plays, 68 yards, 4:23.**
- KC – Ryan Succop 42-yard field goal, 4:12. Tied 6–6. **Drive: 8 plays, 30 yards, 4:34.**
- OAK – Denarius Moore 9-yard pass from Carson Palmer (Sebastian Janikowski kick), 0:49. Raiders 13–6. **Drive: 3 plays, 11 yards, 0:50.**

**Third quarter**

- OAK – Sebastian Janikowski 29-yard field goal, 13:58. Raiders 16–6. **Drive: 4 plays, 7 yards, 0:54.**
- KC – Ryan Succop 52-yard field goal, 8:40. Raiders 16–9. **Drive: 10 plays, 44 yards, 5:18.**
- OAK – Darrius Heyward-Bey 32-yard pass from Carson Palmer (Sebastian Janikowski kick), 5:40. Raiders 23–9. **Drive: 6 plays, 80 yards, 3:00.**

**Fourth quarter**

- OAK – Sebastian Janikowski 32-yard field goal, 8:14. Raiders 26–9. **Drive: 9 plays, 62 yards, 4:47.**
- KC – Dexter McCluster 10-yard pass from Matt Cassel (Ryan Succop kick), 2:27. Raiders 26–16. **Drive: 2 plays, 32 yards, 0:42.**

**Top passers**

- OAK – Carson Palmer – 14/28, 209 yards, 2 TD, INT
- KC – Matt Cassel – 20/30, 218 yards, TD, INT

**Top rushers**

- OAK – Darren McFadden – 29 rushes, 114 yards
- KC – Matt Cassel – 7 rushes, 35 yards

**Top receivers**

- OAK – Denarius Moore – 5 receptions, 96 yards, TD
- KC – Dwayne Bowe – 3 receptions, 65 yards

==== Week 9: at San Diego Chargers ====
Week 9: Kansas City Chiefs at San Diego Chargers – Game summary

| Quarter | 1 | 2 | 3 | 4 | Total |
|---|---|---|---|---|---|
| Chiefs | 0 | 3 | 3 | 7 | **13** |
| **Chargers** | 7 | 3 | 0 | 21 | **31** |

at Qualcomm Stadium, San Diego, California

- Date: November 1
- Game time: 7:20 p.m. CDT/5:20 p.m. PDT
- Game weather: Sunny, 63 °F (17 °C)
- Game attendance: 55,831
- Referee: Alberto Riveron
- TV announcers (NFLN): Brad Nessler, Mike Mayock and Alex Flanagan
- Recap, Game Book

Game information

**First quarter**

- SD – Antonio Gates 14-yard pass from Philip Rivers (Nick Novak kick), 10:24. Chargers 7–0. **Drive: 7 plays, 80 yards, 4:36.**

**Second quarter**

- SD – Nick Novak 25-yard field goal, 9:10. Chargers 10–0. **Drive: 12 plays, 71 yards, 8:08.**
- KC – Ryan Succop 49-yard field goal, 2:51. Chargers 10–3. **Drive: 10 plays, 49 yards, 6:19.**

**Third quarter**

- KC – Ryan Succop 41-yard field goal, 0:53. Chargers 10–6. **Drive: 10 plays, 70 yards, 6:16.**

**Fourth quarter**

- SD – Malcom Floyd 13-yard pass from Philip Rivers (Nick Novak kick), 11:33. Chargers 17–6. **Drive: 8 plays, 80 yards, 4:20.**
- SD – Shaun Phillips fumble recovery in end zone (Nick Novak kick), 10:39. Chargers 24–6.
- SD – Demorrio Williams 59-yard interception return (Nick Novak kick), 8:33. Chargers 31–6.
- KC – Shaun Draughn 6-yard run (Ryan Succop kick), 4:26. Chargers 31–13. **Drive: 10 plays, 80 yards, 4:07.**

**Top passers**

- KC – Matt Cassel – 19/29, 181 yards, INT
- SD – Philip Rivers – 18/20, 220 yards, 2 TD, INT

**Top rushers**

- KC – Jamaal Charles – 12 rushes, 39 yards
- SD – Ryan Mathews – 13 rushes, 67 yards

**Top receivers**

- KC – Dwayne Bowe – 8 receptions, 79 yards
- SD – Danario Alexander – 3 receptions, 61 yards

==== Week 10: at Pittsburgh Steelers ====
Week 10: Kansas City Chiefs at Pittsburgh Steelers – Game summary

| Quarter | 1 | 2 | 3 | 4 | OT | Total |
|---|---|---|---|---|---|---|
| Chiefs | 7 | 3 | 0 | 3 | 0 | **13** |
| **Steelers** | 0 | 10 | 0 | 3 | 3 | **16** |

at Heinz Field, Pittsburgh, Pennsylvania

- Date: November 12
- Game time: 8:30 p.m. EST/7:30 p.m. CST
- Game weather: Light rain, 45 °F (7 °C)
- Game attendance: 57,644
- Referee: Carl Cheffers
- TV announcers (ESPN): Mike Tirico, Jon Gruden and Lisa Salters
- Recap, Game Book

Game information

**First quarter**

- KC – Jamaal Charles 12-yard run (Ryan Succop Kick), 8:37. Chiefs 7–0. **Drive: 4 plays, 70 yards, 1:46.**

**Second quarter**

- KC – Ryan Succop 22-yard field goal, 14:20. Chiefs 10–0. **Drive: 4 plays, 6 yards, 1:47.**
- PIT – Shaun Suisham 35-yard field goal, 9:02. Chiefs 10–3. **Drive: 11 plays, 43 yards, 5:18.**
- PIT – Mike Wallace 7-yard pass from Ben Roethlisberger (Shaun Suisham kick), 3:16. Tied 10–10. **Drive: 7 plays, 50 yards, 3:46.**

**Third quarter**

- No scoring plays.

**Fourth quarter**

- PIT – Shaun Suisham 31-yard field goal, 12:37. Steelers 13–10. **Drive: 11 plays, 73 yards, 6:06.**
- KC – Ryan Succop 46-yard field goal, 0:00. Tied 13–13. **Drive: 9 plays, 52 yards, 1:51.**

**Overtime**

- PIT – Shaun Suisham 23-yard field goal, 14:05. Steelers 16–13. **Drive: 1 play, 0 yards, 0:04.**

**Top passers**

- KC – Matt Cassel – 11/26, 154 yards, INT
- PIT – Ben Roethlisberger – 9/18, 84 yards, TD

**Top rushers**

- KC – Jamaal Charles – 23 rushes, 100 yards, TD
- PIT – Jonathan Dwyer – 19 rushes, 56 yards

**Top receivers**

- KC – Tony Moeaki – 3 receptions, 68 yards
- PIT – Heath Miller – 4 receptions, 47 yards

==== Week 11: vs. Cincinnati Bengals ====
Week 11: Cincinnati Bengals at Kansas City Chiefs – Game summary

| Quarter | 1 | 2 | 3 | 4 | Total |
|---|---|---|---|---|---|
| **Bengals** | 7 | 14 | 0 | 7 | **28** |
| Chiefs | 3 | 3 | 0 | 0 | **6** |

at Arrowhead Stadium, Kansas City, Missouri

- Date: November 18
- Game time: 12:00 p.m. CST
- Game weather: Sunny, 59 °F (15 °C)
- Game attendance: 63,336
- Referee: Gene Steratore
- TV announcers (CBS): Marv Albert and Rich Gannon
- Recap, Game Book

Game information

**First quarter**

- KC – Ryan Succop 34-yard field goal, 8:31. Chiefs 3–0. **Drive: 8 plays, 59 yards, 2:59.**
- CIN – A. J. Green 4-yard pass from Andy Dalton (Mike Nugent kick), 2:51. Bengals 7–3. **Drive: 11 plays, 78 yards, 5:40.**

**Second quarter**

- CIN – Andy Dalton 2-yard run (Mike Nugent kick), 7:52. Bengals 14–3. **Drive: 5 plays, 57 yards, 2:13.**
- CIN – BenJarvus Green-Ellis 1-yard run (Mike Nugent kick), 0:53. Bengals 21–3. **Drive: 11 plays, 79 yards, 5:25.**
- KC – Ryan Succop 33-yard field goal, 0:00. Bengals 21–6. **Drive: 7 plays, 65 yards, 0:63.**

**Third quarter**

- No scoring plays.

**Fourth quarter**

- CIN – Mohamed Sanu 14-yard pass from Andy Dalton (Mike Nugent kick), 9:39. Bengals 28–6. **Drive: 12 plays, 72 yards, 5:21.**

**Top passers**

- CIN – Andy Dalton – 18/29, 230 yards, 2 TD
- KC – Brady Quinn – 9/14, 95 yards

**Top rushers**

- CIN – BenJarvus Green-Ellis – 25 rushes, 101 yards, TD
- KC – Jamaal Charles – 17 rushes, 87 yards

**Top receivers**

- CIN – A. J. Green – 6 receptions, 91 yards, TD
- KC – Tony Moeaki – 4 receptions, 73 yards

==== Week 12: vs. Denver Broncos ====
Week 12: Denver Broncos at Kansas City Chiefs – Game summary

| Quarter | 1 | 2 | 3 | 4 | Total |
|---|---|---|---|---|---|
| **Broncos** | 0 | 7 | 7 | 3 | **17** |
| Chiefs | 6 | 0 | 3 | 0 | **9** |

at Arrowhead Stadium, Kansas City, Missouri

- Date: November 25
- Game time: 12:00 p.m. CST
- Game weather: Sunny, 52 °F (11 °C)
- Game attendance: 74,244
- Referee: Jerome Boger
- TV announcers (CBS): Greg Gumbel and Dan Dierdorf
- Recap, Game Book

Game information

**First quarter**

- KC – Ryan Succop 34-yard field goal, 9:20. Chiefs 3–0. **Drive: 11 plays, 55 yards, 5:40.**
- KC – Ryan Succop 22-yard field goal, 4:31. Chiefs 6–0. **Drive: 7 plays, 33 yards, 3:25.**

**Second quarter**

- DEN – Jacob Tamme 7-yard pass from Peyton Manning (Matt Prater kick), 0:18. Broncos 7–6. **Drive: 11 plays, 94 yards, 4:57.**

**Third quarter**

- KC – Ryan Succop 49-yard field goal, 7:35. Chiefs 9–7. **Drive: 8 plays, 46 yards, 4:22.**
- DEN – Demaryius Thomas 30-yard pass from Peyton Manning (Matt Prater kick), 4:41. Broncos 14–9. **Drive: 7 plays, 80 yards, 2:54.**

**Fourth quarter**

- DEN – Matt Prater 34-yard field goal, 0:14. Broncos 17–9. **Drive: 12 plays, 68 yards, 6:10.**

**Top passers**

- DEN – Peyton Manning – 22/37, 285 yards, 2 TD, INT
- KC – Brady Quinn – 13/25, 126 yards, INT

**Top rushers**

- DEN – Knowshon Moreno – 20 rushes, 85 yards
- KC – Jamaal Charles – 23 rushes, 107 yards

**Top receivers**

- DEN – Demaryius Thomas – 4 receptions, 82 yards, TD
- KC – Dwayne Bowe – 4 receptions, 41 yards

With their 8th consecutive loss, the Chiefs fell to 1-10 and they were eliminated from playoff contention for the 2nd straight year.

==== Week 13: vs. Carolina Panthers ====
Week 13: Carolina Panthers at Kansas City Chiefs – Game summary

| Quarter | 1 | 2 | 3 | 4 | Total |
|---|---|---|---|---|---|
| Panthers | 7 | 7 | 0 | 7 | **21** |
| **Chiefs** | 10 | 7 | 7 | 3 | **27** |

at Arrowhead Stadium, Kansas City, Missouri

- Date: December 2
- Game time: 12:00 p.m. CST
- Game weather: Sunny, 61 °F (16 °C)
- Game attendance: 62,860
- Referee: John Parry
- TV announcers (Fox): Ron Pitts, Mike Martz and Kristina Pink
- Recap, Game Book

Game information

**First quarter**

- KC – Peyton Hillis 2-yard run (Ryan Succop kick), 11:49. Chiefs 7–0. **Drive: 6 plays, 74 yards, 3:11.**
- CAR – Greg Olsen 47-yard pass from Cam Newton (Graham Gano kick), 8:46. Tied 7–7. **Drive: 6 plays, 75 yards, 3:03.**
- KC – Ryan Succop 42-yard field goal, 3:20. Chiefs 10–7. **Drive: 11 plays, 56 yards, 5:26.**

**Second quarter**

- CAR – Steve Smith 23-yard pass from Cam Newton (Graham Gano kick), 13:27. Panthers 14–10. **Drive: 11 plays, 80 yards, 4:53.**
- KC – Tony Moeaki 1-yard pass from Brady Quinn (Ryan Succop kick), 0:00. Chiefs 17–14. **Drive: 13 plays, 80 yards, 7:25.**

**Third quarter**

- KC – Jon Baldwin 3-yard pass from Brady Quinn (Ryan Succop kick), 2:52. Chiefs 24–14. **Drive: 17 plays, 87 yards, 9:56.**

**Fourth quarter**

- CAR – Louis Murphy 8-yard pass from Cam Newton (Graham Gano kick), 13:21. Chiefs 24–21. **Drive: 11 plays, 80 yards, 4:31.**
- KC – Ryan Succop 52-yard field goal, 4:54. Chiefs 27–21. **Drive: 6 plays, 39 yards, 2:36.**

**Top passers**

- CAR – Cam Newton – 15/27, 232 yards, 3 TD
- KC – Brady Quinn – 19/23, 201 yards, 2 TD

**Top rushers**

- CAR – Cam Newton – 7 rushes, 78 yards
- KC – Jamaal Charles – 27 rushes, 127 yards

**Top receivers**

- CAR – Steve Smith – 5 receptions, 120 yards, TD
- KC – Dwayne Bowe – 4 receptions, 64 yards

With the win, the Chiefs snapped their 8 game losing streak and improved 2-10 and finished 2-2 against the NFC South.

==== Week 14: at Cleveland Browns ====
Week 14: Kansas City Chiefs at Cleveland Browns – Game summary

| Quarter | 1 | 2 | 3 | 4 | Total |
|---|---|---|---|---|---|
| Chiefs | 7 | 0 | 0 | 0 | **7** |
| **Browns** | 3 | 7 | 10 | 10 | **30** |

at Cleveland Browns Stadium, Cleveland, Ohio

- Date: December 9
- Game time: 1:00 p.m. EST/12:00 p.m. CST
- Game weather: Cloudy, 47 °F (8 °C)
- Game attendance: 62,422
- Referee: Walt Anderson
- TV announcers (CBS): Bill Macatee and Steve Tasker
- Recap, Game Book

Game information

**First quarter**

- KC – Jamaal Charles 80-yard run (Ryan Succop kick), 14:48. Chiefs 7–0. **Drive: 1 play, 80 yards, 0:12.**
- CLE – Phil Dawson 23-yard field goal, 3:53. Chiefs 7–3. **Drive: 11 plays, 76 yards, 4:00.**

**Second quarter**

- CLE – Travis Benjamin 93-yard punt return (Phil Dawson kick), 14:40. Browns 10–7.

**Third quarter**

- CLE – Trent Richardson 1-yard run (Phil Dawson kick), 12:28. Browns 17–7. **Drive: 7 plays, 60 yards, 2:32.**
- CLE – Phil Dawson 24-yard field goal, 8:42. Browns 20–7. **Drive: 5 plays, 7 yards, 2:23.**

**Fourth quarter**

- CLE – Trent Richardson 1-yard run (Phil Dawson kick), 14:17. Browns 27–7. **Drive: 12 plays, 82 yards, 6:25.**
- CLE – Phil Dawson 34-yard field goal, 9:04 Browns 30–7. **Drive: 6 plays, 18 yards, 2:50.**

**Top passers**

- KC – Brady Quinn – 11/22, 159 yards, INT
- CLE – Brandon Weeden – 17/30, 217 yards

**Top rushers**

- KC – Jamaal Charles – 18 rushes, 165 yards, TD
- CLE – Montario Hardesty – 10 rushes, 52 yards

**Top receivers**

- KC – Dwayne Bowe – 2 receptions, 70 yards
- CLE – Josh Gordon – 8 receptions, 86 yards

With the loss, the Chiefs were swept by the AFC North and they fell to 2-11.

==== Week 15: at Oakland Raiders ====
Week 15: Kansas City Chiefs at Oakland Raiders – Game summary

| Quarter | 1 | 2 | 3 | 4 | Total |
|---|---|---|---|---|---|
| Chiefs | 0 | 0 | 0 | 0 | **0** |
| **Raiders** | 3 | 6 | 3 | 3 | **15** |

at O.co Coliseum, Oakland, California

- Date: December 16
- Game time: 3:25 p.m. CST/1:25 p.m. PST
- Game weather: Cloudy, 54 °F (12 °C)
- Game attendance: 51,446
- Referee: Tony Corrente
- TV announcers (CBS): Kevin Harlan and Solomon Wilcots
- Recap, Game Book

Game information

**First quarter**

- OAK – Sebastian Janikowski 20-yard field goal, 1:44. Raiders 3–0. **Drive: 11 plays, 58 yards, 5:52.**

**Second quarter**

- OAK – Sebastian Janikowski 50-yard field goal, 10:19. Raiders 6–0. **Drive: 4 plays, 7 yards, 1:46.**
- OAK – Sebastian Janikowski 57-yard field goal, 0:00. Raiders 9–0. **Drive: 7 plays, 52 yards, 0:56.**

**Third quarter**

- OAK – Sebastian Janikowski 30-yard field goal, 6:41. Raiders 12–0. **Drive: 13 plays, 81 yards, 7:25.**

**Fourth quarter**

- OAK – Sebastian Janikowski 41-yard field goal, 13:27. Raiders 15–0. **Drive: 9 plays, 69 yards, 4:04.**

**Top passers**

- KC – Brady Quinn – 18/32, 136 yards, INT
- OAK – Carson Palmer – 18/29, 182 yards

**Top rushers**

- KC – Jamaal Charles – 9 rushes, 10 yards
- OAK – Darren McFadden – 30 rushes, 110 yards

**Top receivers**

- KC – Dexter McCluster – 7 receptions, 59 yards
- OAK – Rod Streater – 5 receptions, 62 yards

With the loss the Chiefs dropped to 2-12 and secured a last place finish in the AFC West. This would be the last time the Chiefs were shut out until 2024.

==== Week 16: vs. Indianapolis Colts ====
Week 16: Indianapolis Colts at Kansas City Chiefs – Game summary

| Quarter | 1 | 2 | 3 | 4 | Total |
|---|---|---|---|---|---|
| **Colts** | 7 | 6 | 0 | 7 | **20** |
| Chiefs | 3 | 0 | 10 | 0 | **13** |

at Arrowhead Stadium, Kansas City, Missouri

- Date: December 23
- Game time: 12:00 p.m. CST
- Game weather: Sunny, 25 °F (−4 °C)
- Game attendance: 62,938
- Referee: Ron Winter
- TV announcers (CBS): Bill Macatee and Steve Tasker
- Recap, Game Book

Game information

**First quarter**

- IND – Darius Butler 32-yard interception return (Adam Vinatieri kick), 10:08. Colts 7–0.
- KC – Ryan Succop 47-yard field goal, 8:18. Colts 7–3. **Drive: 6 plays, 51 yards, 1:50.**

**Second quarter**

- IND – Adam Vinatieri 48-yard field goal, 13:27. Colts 10–3. **Drive: 7 plays, 37 yards, 2:14.**
- IND – Adam Vinatieri 36-yard field goal, 0:07. Colts 13–3. **Drive: 7 plays, 60 yards, 0:55.**

**Third quarter**

- KC – Jamaal Charles 86-yard run (Ryan Succop kick), 14:40. Colts 13–10. **Drive: 1 play, 86 yards, 0:20.**
- KC – Ryan Succop 47-yard field goal, 6:00. Tied 13–13. **Drive: 8 plays, 52 yards, 4:02.**

**Fourth quarter**

- IND – Reggie Wayne 7-yard pass from Andrew Luck (Adam Vinatieri kick), 4:08. Colts 20–13. **Drive: 13 plays, 73 yards, 6:05.**

**Top passers**

- IND – Andrew Luck – 17/35, 205 yards, TD
- KC – Brady Quinn – 10/22, 162 yards, 2 INT

**Top rushers**

- IND – Vick Ballard – 20 rushes, 69 yards
- KC – Jamaal Charles – 22 rushes, 226 yards, TD

**Top receivers**

- IND – Reggie Wayne – 5 receptions, 81 yards, TD
- KC – Jon Baldwin – 2 receptions, 64 yards

With the loss, the Chiefs fell to 2-13 and finished 1-7 at home.

==== Week 17: at Denver Broncos ====
Week 17: Kansas City Chiefs at Denver Broncos – Game summary

| Quarter | 1 | 2 | 3 | 4 | Total |
|---|---|---|---|---|---|
| Chiefs | 0 | 3 | 0 | 0 | **3** |
| **Broncos** | 7 | 14 | 14 | 3 | **38** |

at Sports Authority Field at Mile High, Denver, Colorado

- Date: December 30
- Game time: 3:25 p.m. CST/2:25 p.m. MST
- Game weather: Partly cloudy, 35 °F (2 °C)
- Game attendance: 76,502
- Referee: Ed Hochuli
- TV announcers (CBS): Ian Eagle and Dan Fouts
- Recap, Game Book

Game information

**First quarter**

- DEN – Knowshon Moreno 3-yard run (Matt Prater kick), 9:56. Broncos 7–0. **Drive: 8 plays, 69 yards, 3:06.**

**Second quarter**

- KC – Ryan Succop 23-yard field goal, 14:53. Broncos 7–3. **Drive: 4 plays, 7 yards, 1:16.**
- DEN – Eric Decker 11-yard pass from Peyton Manning (Matt Prater kick), 8:18. Broncos 14–3. **Drive: 9 plays, 76 yards, 4:00.**
- DEN – Eric Decker 16-yard pass from Peyton Manning (Matt Prater kick), 0:10. Broncos 21–3. **Drive: 8 plays, 59 yards, 1:27.**

**Third quarter**

- DEN – Demaryius Thomas 13-yard pass from Peyton Manning (Matt Prater kick), 9:10. Broncos 28–3. **Drive: 11 plays, 80 yards, 5:50.**
- DEN – Lance Ball 1-yard run (Matt Prater kick), 1:04. Broncos 35–3. **Drive: 9 plays, 74 yards, 5:36.**

**Fourth quarter**

- DEN – Matt Prater 42-yard field goal, 8:09. Broncos 38–3. **Drive: 11 plays, 43 yards, 6:10.**

**Top passers**

- KC – Brady Quinn – 7/16, 49 yards
- DEN – Peyton Manning – 23/29, 304 yards, 3 TD

**Top rushers**

- KC – Jamaal Charles – 14 rushes, 53 yards
- DEN – Lance Ball – 15 rushes, 66 yards, TD

**Top receivers**

- KC – Tony Moeaki – 2 receptions, 21 yards
- DEN – Demaryius Thomas – 7 receptions, 122 yards, TD

With the loss the Chiefs finished the season at 2-14 (0-6 against the AFC West) and 1-7 on the road. Directly tying their 2008 record for the worst in franchise history while tying the 1981 Colts with their 9th 14+ loss. This would be their last losing season until 2025. However, this still remains both the last time they failed beat an AFC West team (or an AFC team) or finished dead last in their division.

=== Standings ===
==== Division ====
AFC West
| | W | L | T | PCT | DIV | CONF | PF | PA | STK |
|---|---|---|---|---|---|---|---|---|---|
| ^{(1)} Denver Broncos | 13 | 3 | 0 | .813 | 6–0 | 10–2 | 481 | 289 | W11 |
| San Diego Chargers | 7 | 9 | 0 | .438 | 4–2 | 7–5 | 350 | 350 | W2 |
| Oakland Raiders | 4 | 12 | 0 | .250 | 2–4 | 4–8 | 290 | 443 | L2 |
| Kansas City Chiefs | 2 | 14 | 0 | .125 | 0–6 | 0–12 | 211 | 425 | L4 |

==== Conference ====
AFC
| # | Team | Division | W | L | T | PCT | DIV | CONF | SOS | SOV | STK |
|---|---|---|---|---|---|---|---|---|---|---|---|
**Division winners**
| 1 | Denver Broncos | West | 13 | 3 | 0 | .813 | 6–0 | 10–2 | .457 | .385 | W11 |
| 2 (Note: New England clinched the AFC's No. 2 seed over Houston based on a head-to-head victory.) | New England Patriots | East | 12 | 4 | 0 | .750 | 6–0 | 11–1 | .496 | .466 | W2 |
| 3 | Houston Texans | South | 12 | 4 | 0 | .750 | 5–1 | 10–2 | .496 | .432 | L2 |
| 4 (Note: Baltimore clinched the AFC North title over Cincinnati based on a better divisional record (4–2 to 3–3).) | Baltimore Ravens | North | 10 | 6 | 0 | .625 | 4–2 | 8–4 | .496 | .438 | L1 |
**Wild cards**
| 5 | Indianapolis Colts | South | 11 | 5 | 0 | .688 | 4–2 | 8–4 | .441 | .403 | W2 |
| 6 | Cincinnati Bengals | North | 10 | 6 | 0 | .625 | 3–3 | 7–5 | .438 | .381 | W3 |
**Did not qualify for the postseason**
| 7 | Pittsburgh Steelers | North | 8 | 8 | 0 | .500 | 3–3 | 5–7 | .465 | .438 | W1 |
| 8 (Note: San Diego finished with a better conference record than Miami (7–5 to 5–7).) | San Diego Chargers | West | 7 | 9 | 0 | .438 | 4–2 | 7–5 | .457 | .286 | W2 |
| 9 | Miami Dolphins | East | 7 | 9 | 0 | .438 | 2–4 | 5–7 | .500 | .415 | L1 |
| 10 (Note: Tennessee finished ahead of New York Jets based on head-to-head victory.) | Tennessee Titans | South | 6 | 10 | 0 | .375 | 1–5 | 5–7 | .512 | .344 | W1 |
| 11 (Note: New York Jets finished ahead of Buffalo in the AFC East based on record versus common opponents (5–7 to 3–9).) | New York Jets | East | 6 | 10 | 0 | .375 | 2–4 | 4–8 | .512 | .401 | L3 |
| 12 | Buffalo Bills | East | 6 | 10 | 0 | .375 | 2–4 | 5–7 | .480 | .281 | W1 |
| 13 | Cleveland Browns | North | 5 | 11 | 0 | .313 | 2–4 | 5–7 | .508 | .388 | L3 |
| 14 | Oakland Raiders | West | 4 | 12 | 0 | .250 | 2–4 | 4–8 | .469 | .219 | L2 |
| 15 (Note: Jacksonville finished with a better conference record than Kansas City (2–10 to 0–12).) | Jacksonville Jaguars | South | 2 | 14 | 0 | .125 | 2–4 | 2–10 | .539 | .531 | L5 |
| 16 | Kansas City Chiefs | West | 2 | 14 | 0 | .125 | 0–6 | 0–12 | .516 | .438 | L4 |
**Tiebreakers** (Note: When breaking ties for three or more teams under the NFL's rules, they are first broken within divisions, then comparing only the highest ranked remaining team from each division.)
