= Banks Township, Carbon County, Pennsylvania =

Township in Pennsylvania, US

Banks Township
- township
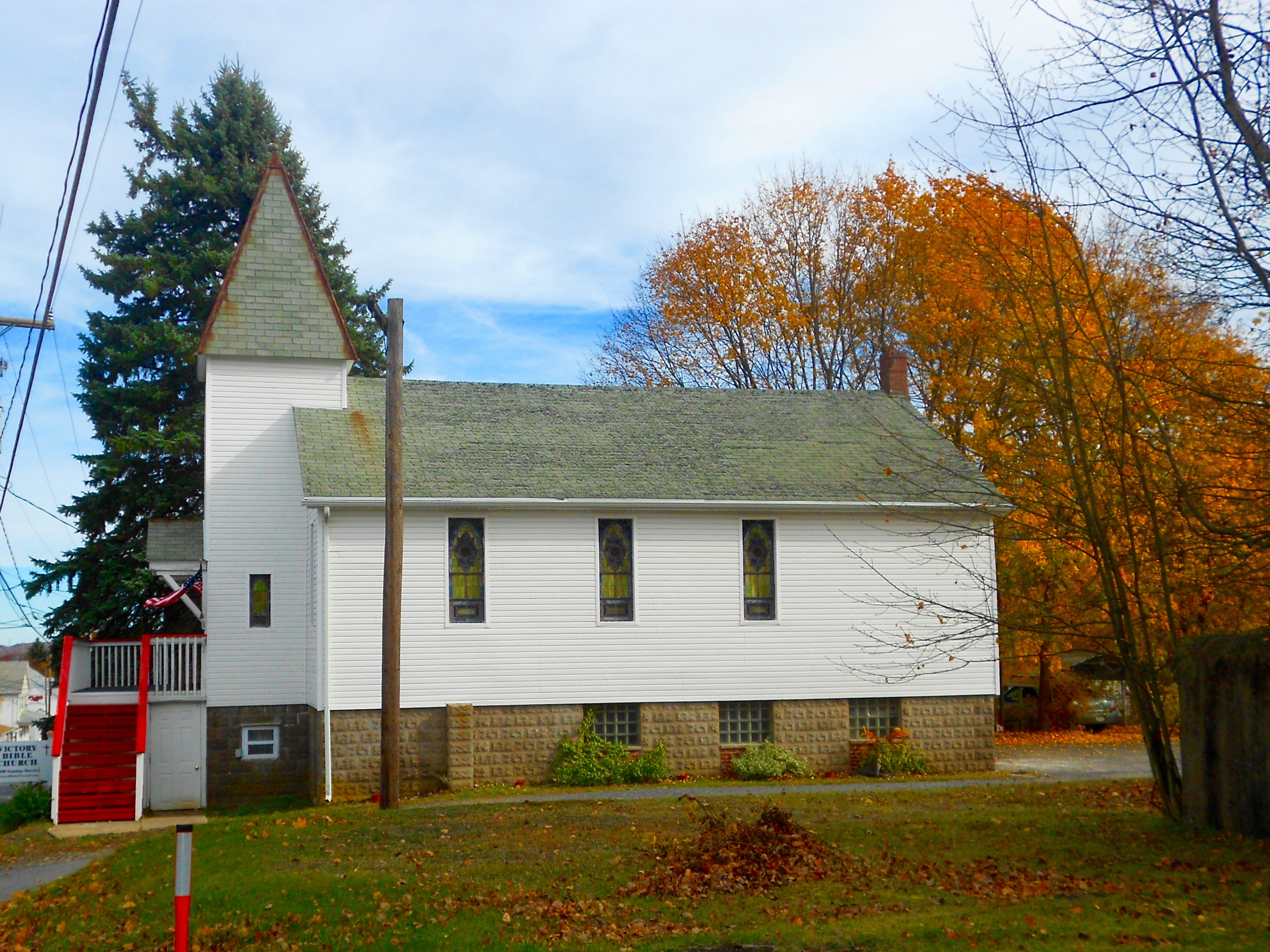
- Victory Bible Church in Junedale, November 2016

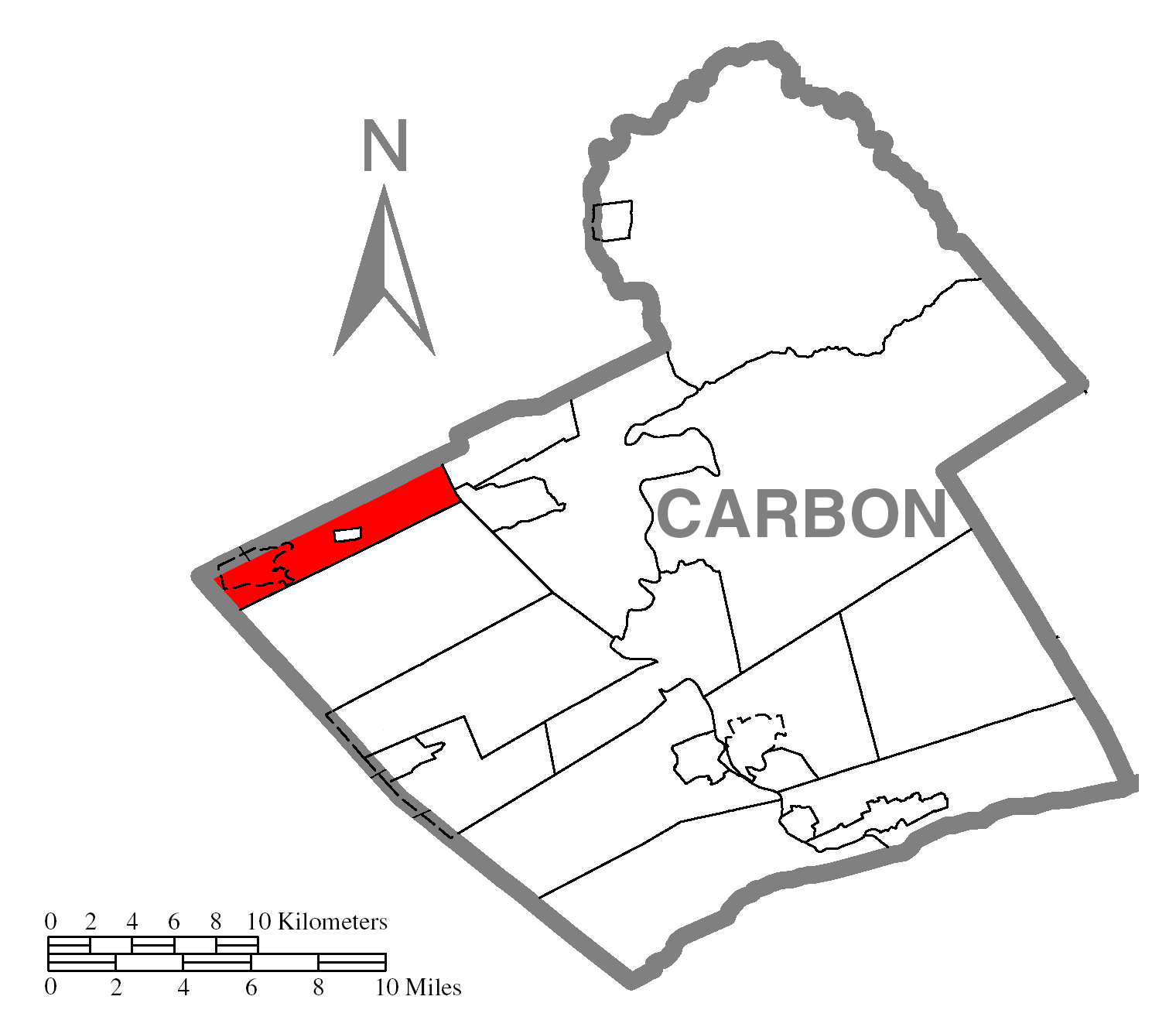
- Location of Banks Township in Carbon County

- Location of Banks Township in Pennsylvania Banks Township (the United States)
- Coordinates: 40°55′45″N 75°55′22″W
- Country: United States
- State: Pennsylvania
- County: Carbon

Area
  - Total: 11.63 sq mi (30.11 km^{2})
  - Land: 11.63 sq mi (30.11 km^{2})
  - Water: 0 sq mi (0.00 km^{2})
- Elevation: 1,600 ft (490 m)

Population (2020)
  - Total: 1,164
  - Density: 103.8/sq mi (40.09/km^{2})
- Time zone: UTC-5 (EST)
  - Summer (DST): UTC-4 (EDT)
- Area code: 570
- FIPS code: 42-025-04048

Banks Township is a township in Carbon County, Pennsylvania. It is part of Northeastern Pennsylvania.

The population was 1,164 at the 2020 census.

== Geography ==
Banks Township is located in western Carbon County and is bordered by Luzerne County to the north and Schuylkill County to the west. Its southern border approximately follows the crest of Spring Mountain. The township surrounds the borough of Beaver Meadows but is separate from it. Its villages include Audenried, Coxes, Junedale, and Tresckow.

According to the U.S. Census Bureau, the township has a total area of 11.6 square miles (30.1 km^{2}), all of it land. Most of it is drained by Black Creek east into the Lehigh River, except for the Audenried area which is drained west by Catawissa Creek into the Susquehanna River.

Banks has a warm-summer humid continental climate (Dfb) and the hardiness zones are 5b and 6a. Average monthly temperatures in Junedale range from 23.7 °F in January to 69.8 °F in July.

=== Neighboring municipalities ===
- Lausanne Township (east)
- Weatherly (east)
- Packer Township (south)
- Kline Township, Schuylkill County (west)
- McAdoo, Schuylkill County (west)
- Hazle Township, Luzerne County (north)

Banks Township surrounds the borough of Beaver Meadows.

== Transportation ==
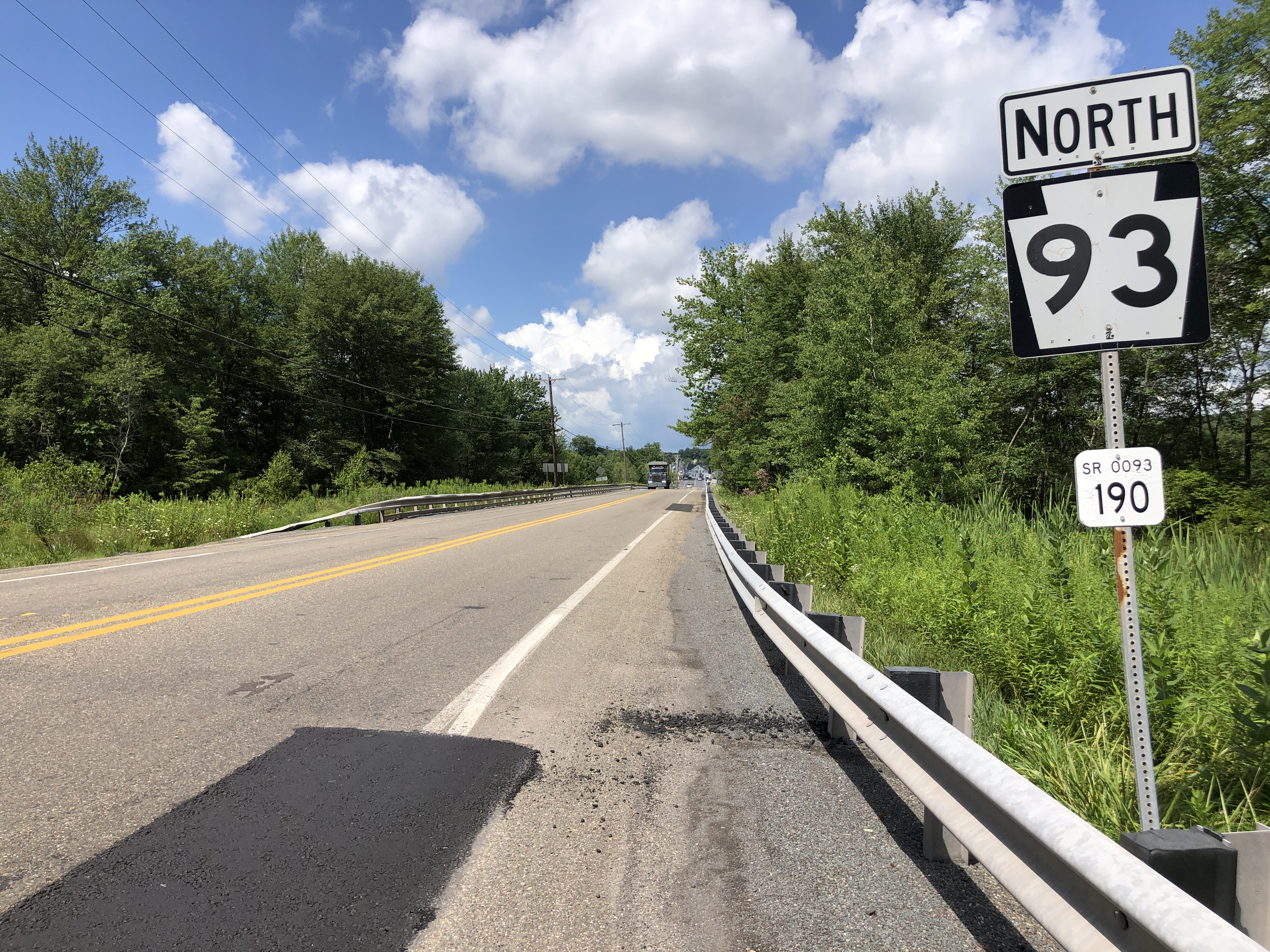
PA Route 93 northbound in Banks Township

As of 2020, there were 15.25 miles (24.54 km) of public roads in Banks Township, of which 10.80 miles (17.38 km) were maintained by the Pennsylvania Department of Transportation (PennDOT) and 4.45 miles (7.16 km) were maintained by the township.

Route 93 passes through the township and Beaver Meadows, leading northwest 3 miles (5 km) to Hazleton and southeast 12 miles (19 km) to Jim Thorpe, the county seat of Carbon County. Route 309 runs through the extreme west of the township via Audenried on its way between Hazleton to the north and Tamaqua to the south.

== Demographics ==
Historical population
Census	Pop.	Note	%±
1850	1,745		—
1860	2,502		43.4%
1870	3,982		59.2%
1880	4,018		0.9%
1890	4,461		11.0%
1900	4,113		−7.8%
1910	4,719		14.7%
1920	4,112		−12.9%
1930	3,856		−6.2%
1940	3,321		−13.9%
1950	2,413		−27.3%
1960	1,858		−23.0%
1970	1,760		−5.3%
1980	1,696		−3.6%
1990	1,485		−12.4%
2000	1,359		−8.5%
2010	1,262		−7.1%
2020	1,164		−7.8%
U.S. Decennial Census

As of the census of 2000, there were 1,359 people, 570 households, and 384 families residing in the township. The population density was 123.6 inhabitants per square mile (47.7/km^{2}). There were 620 housing units at an average density of 56.4 per square mile (21.8/km^{2}). The racial makeup of the township was 98.90% White, 0.37% African American, 0.29% Native American, 0.07% Asian, 0.15% Pacific Islander, and 0.22% from two or more races. Hispanic or Latino of any race were 0.81% of the population.

There were 570 households, out of which 24.0% had children under the age of 18 living with them, 50.4% were married couples living together, 12.3% had a female householder with no husband present, and 32.6% were non-families. 30.2% of all households were made up of individuals, and 16.1% had someone living alone who was 65 years of age or older. The average household size was 2.34 and the average family size was 2.89.

In the township, the population was spread out, with 20.1% under the age of 18, 5.5% from 18 to 24, 28.0% from 25 to 44, 24.1% from 45 to 64, and 22.3% who were 65 years of age or older. The median age was 43 years. For every 100 females, there were 88.2 males. For every 100 females age 18 and over, there were 84.4 males.

The median income for a household in the township was $32,083, and the median income for a family was $40,000. Males had a median income of $31,534 versus $26,157 for females. The per capita income for the township was $16,186. About 7.6% of families and 9.1% of the population were below the poverty line, including 13.8% of those under age 18 and 9.3% of those age 65 or over.
