= Junedale, Pennsylvania =

Unincorporated community in Pennsylvania, US

- Unincorporated community
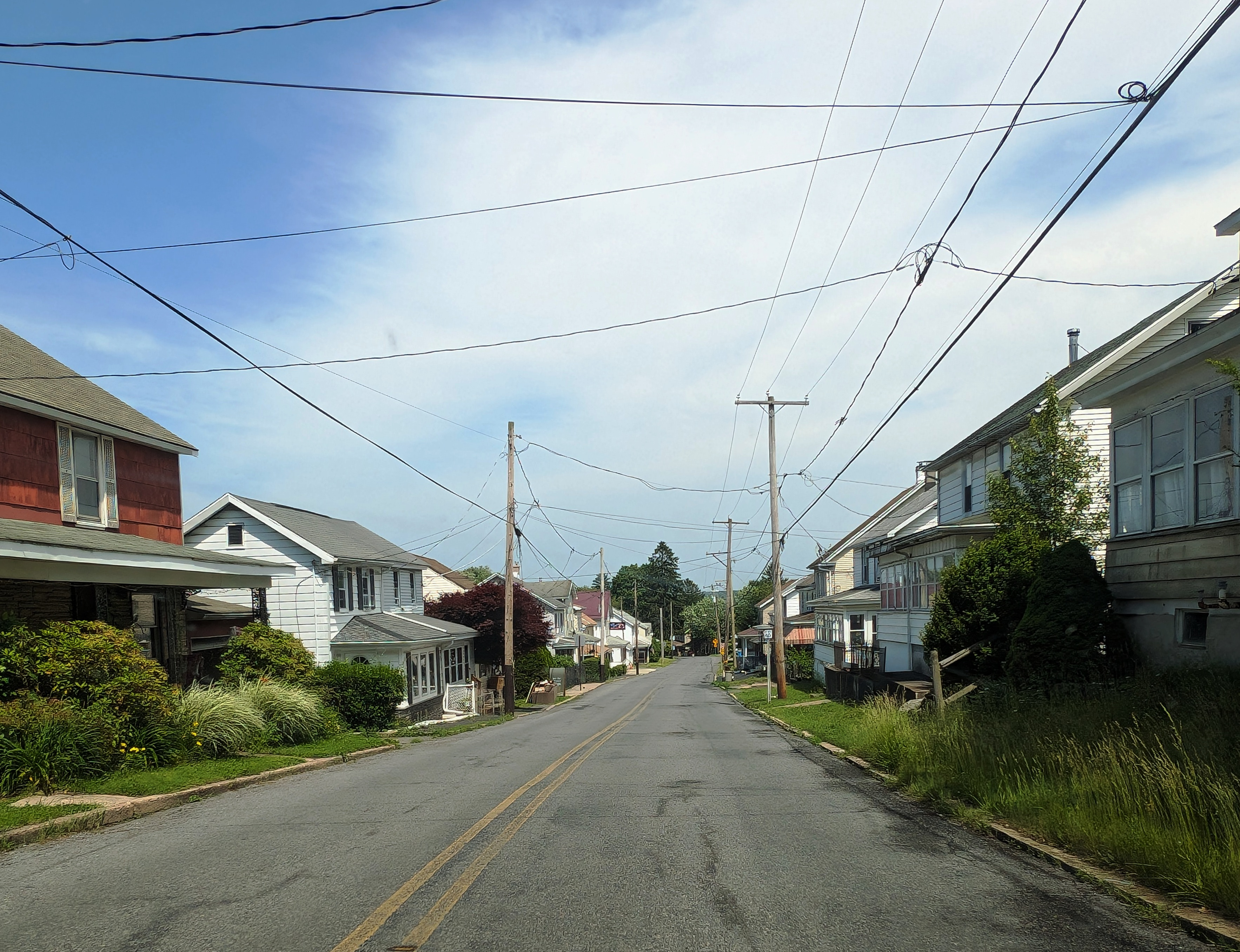
- Main Street eastbound through Junedale

- Location within Pennsylvania Location within the United States
- Coordinates: 40°55′24″N 75°56′30″W
- Country: United States
- State: Pennsylvania
- County: Carbon
- Township: Banks
- Elevation: 1,670 ft (510 m)
- Time zone: UTC-5 (Eastern (EST))
  - Summer (DST): UTC-4 (EDT)
- ZIP code: 18230
- Area codes: 570 and 272
- GNIS feature ID: 1178192

Junedale is an unincorporated community located in Banks Township in Carbon County, Pennsylvania, United States. Junedale is part of the Lehigh Valley, which has a population of 861,899 and is the 68th most populated metropolitan area in the U.S. as of the 2020 census.

Junedale is located along Main Street west of Beaver Meadows and east of Tresckow.
