= Nate Eachus =

American football player (born 1990)

Profile
- Position: Running back

Personal information
- Born: June 15, 1990 (age 36); Wilkes-Barre, Pennsylvania, U.S.
- Listed height: 5 ft 10 in (1.78 m)
- Listed weight: 212 lb (96 kg)

Career information
- High school: Hazleton (Hazleton, Pennsylvania)
- College: Colgate
- NFL draft: 2012: undrafted

Career history
- Kansas City Chiefs (2012)

Career NFL statistics
- Rushing yards: 18
- Rushing avg: 3.6
- Receptions: 1
- Receiving yards: 19
- Stats at Pro Football Reference

Nathan Eachus (born June 15, 1990) is an American former professional football player who was a running back for the Kansas City Chiefs of the National Football League (NFL). He was signed by the Chiefs as an undrafted free agent in 2012. He played college football for the Colgate Raiders.

Eachus played high school football at Hazleton Area High School in Hazleton, Pennsylvania and was only recruited by Hofstra, Maine and Colgate. Eachus was also a standout wrestler in high school.

At Colgate, Eachus was named to the Patriot League first-team three times and set the Patriot League record for single-game rushing yards. As a senior, he was a consensus first-team All-American, the Patriot League Offensive Player of the Year and a finalist for the Walter Payton Award. After being passed over in the 2012 NFL draft, he signed with the Kansas City Chiefs on April 28, 2012.

Eachus finished third in the league in rushing yards in the 2012 NFL preseason. During the regular season, he served as the primary blocker for Pro Bowl running back Jamaal Charles. Eachus appeared in a total of eleven games, rushed for 18 yards and caught one pass for 19 yards. He was released before the 2013 season after the Chiefs replaced head coach Romeo Crennel with Andy Reid.

After his brief NFL career, Eachus worked variously as a personal trainer, high school football coach and wholesaler of hemp products.

In 2017, Eachus signed with the Boston Blaze of the Can-Am Indoor Football League.

In 2024, Eachus cast his support for Donald Trump on an Instagram story.
