= John Yaccino =

American football player (1940–2019)

No. 25
- Position: Defensive back

Personal information
- Born: June 27, 1940; Hazleton, Pennsylvania
- Died: March 20, 2019 (aged 78); Ponte Vedra Beach, Florida
- Listed height: 6 ft 0 in (1.83 m)
- Listed weight: 190 lb (86 kg)

Career information
- High school: Hazleton (PA)
- College: Pittsburgh

Career history
- Buffalo Bills (1962)
- Stats at Pro Football Reference

John Yaccino (June 27, 1940 – March 20, 2019) was an American football defensive back. He played for the Buffalo Bills in 1962.

He died on March 20, 2019, in Ponte Vedra Beach, Florida at age 78.
