= Hazleton Area School District =

School district in Pennsylvania

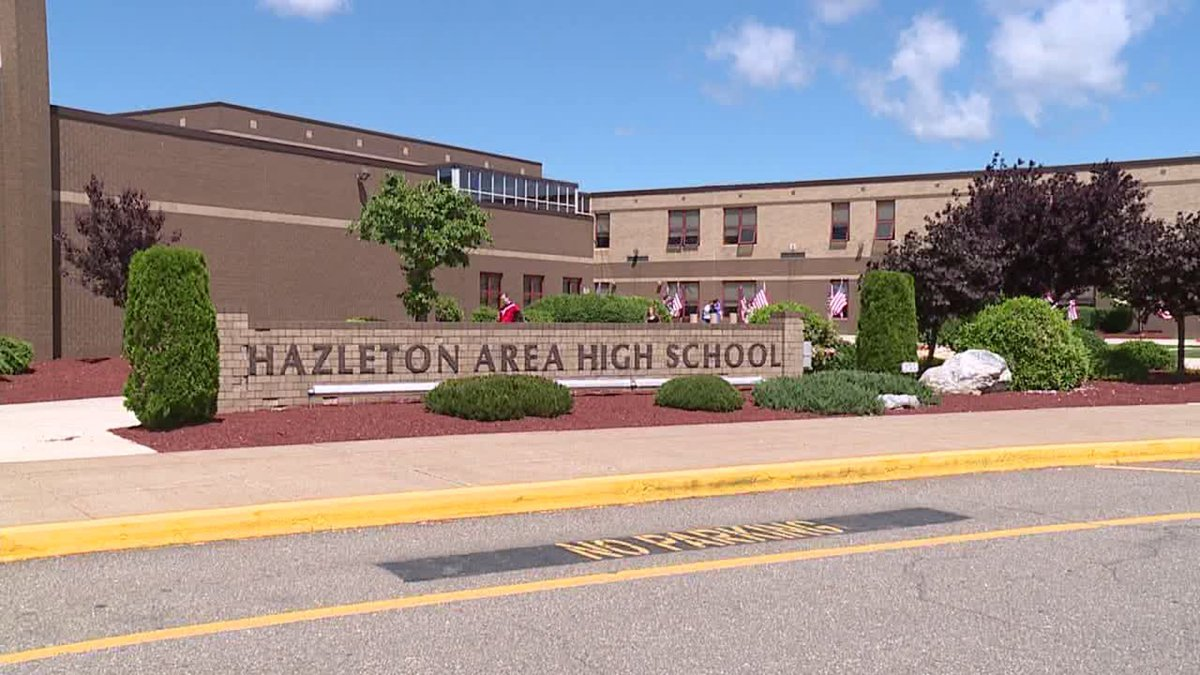
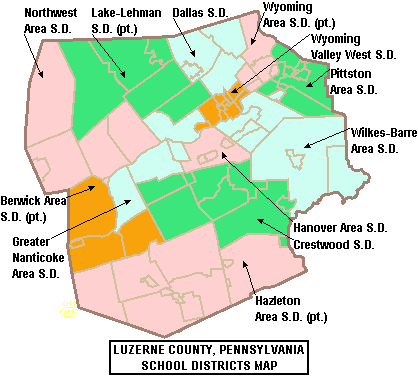
- Logo Seal Hazleton Area High School in Hazle Township in June 2018 Location of Hazleton Area School

Address
- 1515 West 23rd Street Hazleton, Luzerne County, Pennsylvania, 18202; United States

District information
- Type: Public
- Schools: 13, including Hazleton Area High School
- Budget: $204.164 million
- NCES District ID: 4211700

Students and staff
- Students: 12,609 (2023-24)
- Teachers: 751.00 (on an FTE basis)
- Student–teacher ratio: 16.79
- District mascot: Cougars
- Colors: Red, silver, and white

Other information
- Website: Hazleton Area School District

Hazleton Area School District is a large public school district in Pennsylvania, stretching across portions of Luzerne, Schuylkill, and Carbon Counties. Its headquarters are in Hazle Township. Students in grade nine through 12 attend Hazleton Area High School.

The large district is centered on the city of Hazleton and serves the surrounding Luzerne County municipalities of Freeland, Jeddo, Foster Township, Butler Township, Conyngham, West Hazleton, Hazle Township, Drums, Sugarloaf Township, and Black Creek Township. In Schuylkill County, the district encompasses Kline Township, North Union Township, and East Union Township, plus the borough of McAdoo. Beaver Meadows and Banks Township in Carbon County are also within district boundaries. The Hazleton Area School District encompasses approximately 250 square miles (650 km^{2}). According to 2000 federal census data, it served a resident population of 70,042. By 2010, the district's population increased to 72,862 people. The educational attainment levels for the Hazleton Area School District population (25 years old and over) were 83.8% high school graduates and 15.2% college graduates. The district is one of the 500 public school districts of Pennsylvania.

According to the Pennsylvania Budget and Policy Center, 66.1% of the district's pupils lived at 185% or below the Federal Poverty Level as shown by their eligibility for the federal free or reduced price school meal programs in 2012. In 2013 the Pennsylvania Department of Education, reported that 135 students in the Hazleton Area School District were homeless.

In 2009, the Hazleton Area School District resident's per capita income was $18,055, while the median family income was $42,206. In Luzerne County, the median household income was $44,402.

By 2013, the median household income in the United States rose to $52,100. In 2014, the median household income in the United States was $53,700.

Hazleton Area School District operates ten schools: Arthur Street (K-2), Arthur Street Elementary School Annex (PreK-2), Maple Manor Elementary-Middle School (3-8), McAdoo-Kelayres Elementary School (K-8), Drums Elementary-Middle School (K-8), Freeland Elementary-Middle School (K-8), Heights Elementary-Middle School (K-8), Valley Elementary-Middle School (K-8), West Hazleton Elementary-Middle Schools (K-8); and Hazleton Elementary-Middle School (K-6). Students culminate their schooling with grades 9 through 12 at the Hazleton Area High School, or Academy of Science building.

As of the 2023-24 school year, the Hazleton Area School District had 12,609 students and 751 faculty members for a student–teacher ratio of 16.79, according to National Center for Education Statistics data.

== History ==
Hazleton Area High School was created on September 2, 1992. The Hazleton Area School district consists of various high schools, such as Freeland, West Hazleton, and Hazleton. It first began when the school athletics combined to create one team, the Hazleton Area Cougars. Since 1992, The Science Technology Engineering and Mathematics school has opened, in 2013. Also, with innovative ways to improve education, the Career Center has evolved, with regular college prep courses available to take inside the Career Center, rather than walking to the High School as often. The combine has improved academic success, which was the main reason to do so. Historically, the combine was known across the state instantly.

In the 1992–1993 basketball season, the Hazleton Area Cougars made a State tournament final run. This athletic success in Hazleton Area in the first year, as students from all the previous High Schools came together. 26 years later, the Boys' 2017–2018 basketball team reached the Final Four in the State Tournament.

In 1999, the newly elected Lou Barletta had a vision of Hazleton, advertising Hazleton on poster boards in New York City and Philadelphia, which increased the resident population. Due to the population change, ever since 2000, the class population has grown to approximately 700–900 students per grade.

== Schools ==
=== High School ===
- Hazleton Area High School
- Hazleton Area Academy of Sciences
- Hazleton Area Arts and Humanities Academy

=== K-8 ===
- Drums Elementary/Middle School
- Freeland Elementary/Middle School
- Hazleton Elementary / Middle School
- Heights-Terrace Elementary / Middle School
- Maple Manor Elementary/Middle School
- McAdoo Kelayres Elementary / Middle School
- Valley Elementary / Middle School
- West Hazleton Elementary / Middle School

=== Elementary ===
- Arthur Street Elementary
- Hazle Township Early Learning Center (PK-2)

== Extracurricular activities ==
The district offers a variety of clubs, activities and sports.

Extracurricular sports include:

- Boys & girls basketball
- Football
- Boys & girls volleyball
- Baseball
- Softball
- Boys & girls soccer
- Swimming and diving
- Cross country
- Track & field
- Boys and girls tennis
- Field hockey
- Golf
- Water polo
- Bowling
- Wrestling
- Lacrosse

== Notable alumni ==
- Lou Barletta, former U.S. Congressman
- Nate Eachus, former professional football player, Kansas City Chiefs
- Norm Larker, former professional baseball player, Los Angeles Dodgers and Milwaukee Brewers
- Judith Joy Ross, fine art portrait photographer
- John Yaccino, former professional football player, Buffalo Bills
- José Menendez, former business executive, known as the father of brothers Lyle and Erik Menendez, who killed their parents in August 1989.^{a}

== Notes ==
1.^a José graduated from Hazleton High School in 1961, before the period between 1966 and 1992 when most high schools closed. It is now known as Hazleton Area High School, created on September 2, 1992.
