= Hazleton Public Transit =

Bus Operations in Hazleton

- Service area: Hazleton, Pennsylvania
- Service type: Bus
- Routes: 14
- Stations: Church Street Station; 126 Mine Street
- Operator: Easton Coach
- Website: www.ridehpt.com

Hazleton Public Transit (HPT) is a provider of public transportation and demand response service for persons with disabilities for the city of Hazleton, Pennsylvania and its surrounding area.

== Routes ==
All services originate at Church Street Station, an intermodal center located at 126 Mine Street in Downtown Hazleton. Services operate on a Monday through Friday schedule, however, a modified Saturday schedule, and a modified Sunday schedule operate into key travel locations on those days.

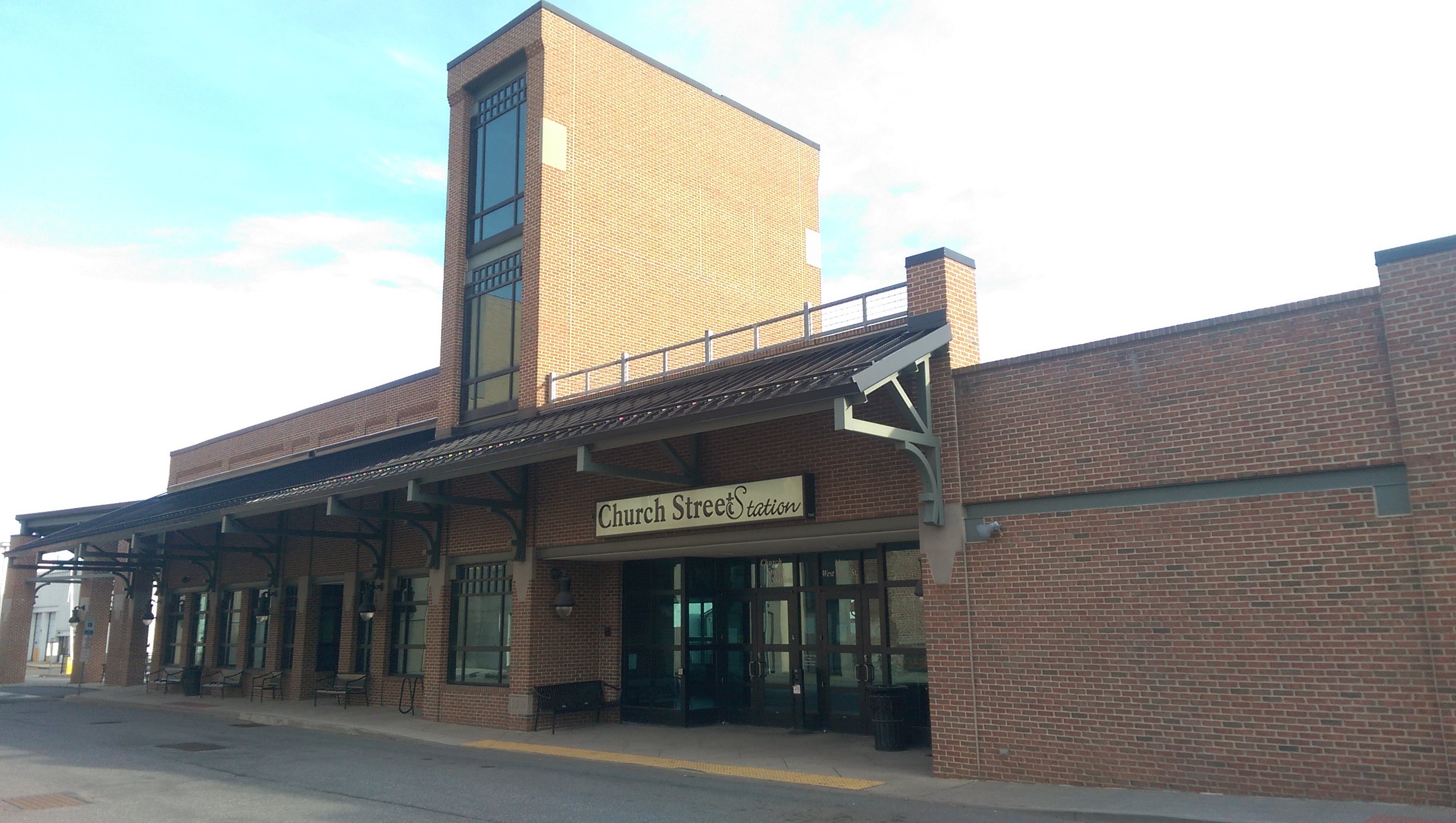
Church Street Station

Route are as follows:

- 5: Humboldt Industrial Park
- 10: Hazleton Heights
- 20/30: McAdoo/Kelayres/Beaver Meadows/Weatherly
- 40: Freeland
- 50: Northeast Diamond
- 60: Northwest Diamond
- 70: West Hazleton
- 80: Hazle Marketplace
- 90: Penn State
- 95: Summer Loop
- 100: Sunday Loop
- 110: Saturday Loop
- Wilkes-Barre Shuttle

== Bus Fleet ==
HPT operates with a mix of smaller cutaway style vans and conventional transit style buses to transport passengers.

Presently, HPT operates using Gillig buses including the Low Floor and Phantom models, and Ford E-450 cutaway vans for conventional bus service.

== Connections with other agencies ==
HPT connects with the Luzerne County Transportation Authority at the Wyoming Valley Mall and Mohegan Sun Casino; Schuylkill Transportation System at McAdoo; and Fullington Trailways in Hazleton at the Church Street Station.

== Proposed merger with Luzerne County Transportation Authority ==
PennDOT has proposed merging HPT operations with the Luzerne County Transportation Authority, creating a unified agency for Luzerne County. PennDOT makes recommendations that the merger would result in significant savings to both agencies with the merger, due to ending redundancies with upper management positions, an allegation that members of the Hazleton City Council dispute. PennDOT also assures that passengers would see no changes to services, possibly improvements with better coordination with one team creating schedules.
