= Schuylkill Transportation System =

Bus transportation service in Pottsville, Pennsylvania

- Founded: 1982
- Headquarters: 252 Industrial Park Road; St. Clair, Pennsylvania, U.S.
- Service area: Schuylkill County, Pennsylvania, U.S.
- Service type: Bus
- Routes: 11
- Stations: Pottsville station Pottsville, Pennsylvania, U.S.
- Website: www.go-sts.com

Schuylkill Transportation System or STS is a public transportation service located in Pottsville, Pennsylvania. It provides inter-city bus and paratransit service to select communities within Schuylkill County, Pennsylvania.

The system was created by the Schuylkill County Board of Commissioners, replacing service on the recently defunct service at the time of the East Penn Transportation Company.

== Route list ==
Most routes operate on a hub and spoke system out of Pottsville, with a secondary hub located in Shenandoah. Many services operate Monday through Friday, however, fewer trips operate Saturdays, with no service on Sundays and major holidays.

- 10- Shenandoah-Pottsville
- 14- Pottsville-Port Carbon/St. Clair (Saturdays only)
- 20- Pottsville-Minersville
- 30- Pottsville-Schuylkill Haven
- 40- Pottsville-Middleport
- 45- Pottsville-McAdoo
- 46- Coaldale Loop
- 47- Pottsville-Hometown Auction (seasonal)
- 51- Shenandoah-Mahanoy City
- 52- Shenandoah-Ashland
- 80- Southern Loop
- 100- Pottsville Loop

== Fares ==
STS implemented a base fare, paid upon boarding the bus. The base fare may vary, with a full fare for adults, and reduced fare for children between the ages of nine and twelve. Children under eight years of age, and senior aged adults over the age of sixty-five are eligible to ride for free, with senior fares subsidized by the Pennsylvania State Lottery Program.

In addition, passengers are eligible to transfer between buses for a reduced fee compared to the base fare.

== Bus Fleet ==
The STS fleet operates with Gillig brand buses in their Phantom and BRT series models for conventional transit service, with smaller cutaway vans used in their lower patronized service, and ADA accessible paratransit service.

== Connections to other agencies ==
STS services connect with Hazleton Public Transit services in McAdoo. STS service also connects with Lower Anthracite Transportation System service at Ashland on their Route 1 service. STS service connects with Berks Area Regional Transportation Authority service in Hamburg.

Additionally, long distance bus service connections are available to Fullington Trailways bus service in Shenandoah, Frackville, Mahanoy City, Hometown, and Pottsville.
