= McAdoo, Pennsylvania =

Borough in Pennsylvania, US

- Borough
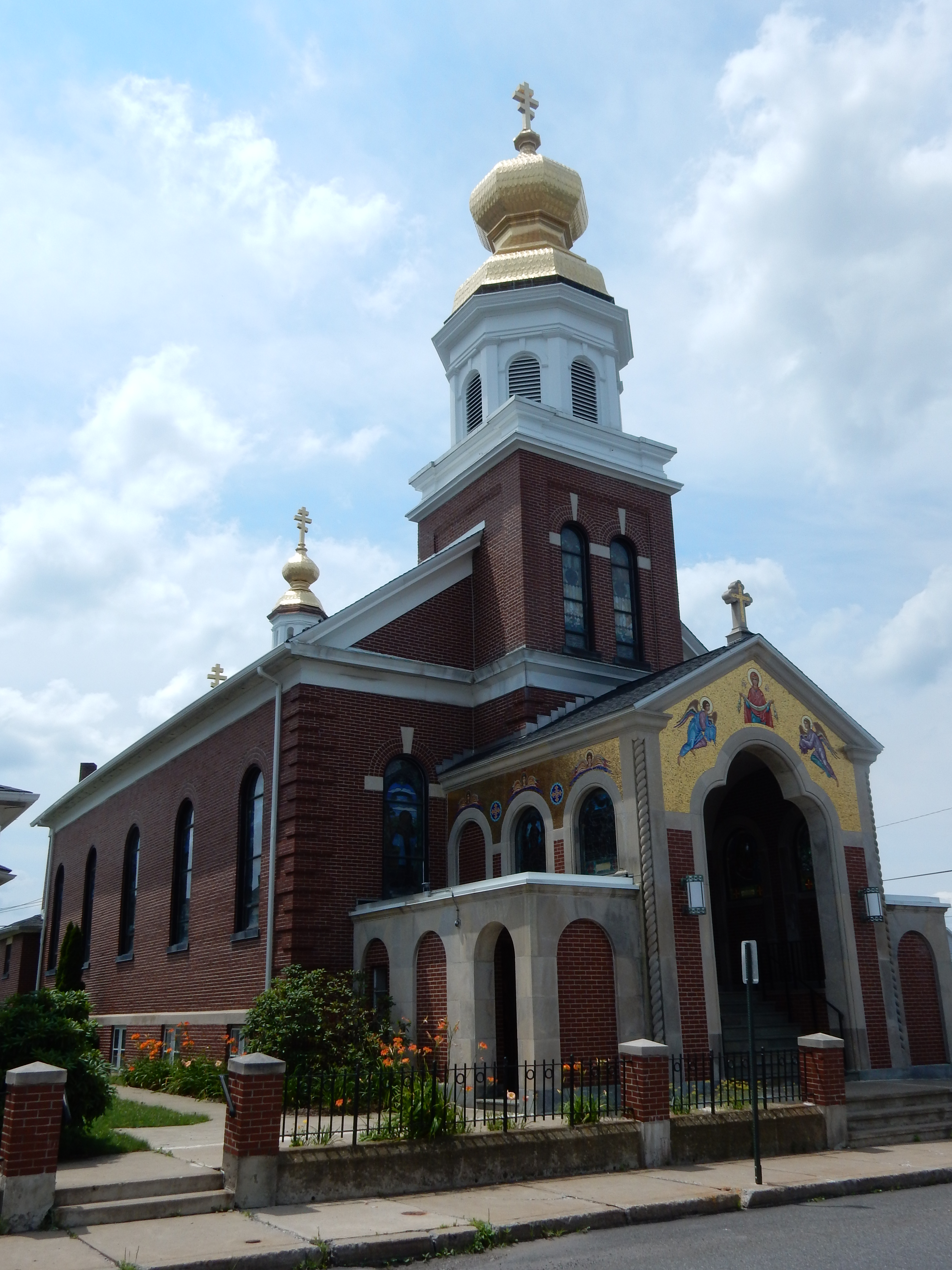
- St. Mary's Ukrainian Catholic Church.

- Location of McAdoo in Schuylkill County, Pennsylvania.

- Location in Pennsylvania McAdoo (the United States)
- Coordinates: 40°54′03″N 75°59′31″W
- Country: United States
- State: Pennsylvania
- County: Schuylkill
- Incorporated: 1896

Government
  - Type: Borough Council
  - Mayor: Bernard Vilcheck

Area
  - Total: 0.35 sq mi (0.90 km^{2})
  - Land: 0.35 sq mi (0.90 km^{2})
  - Water: 0 sq mi (0.00 km^{2})

Population (2020)
  - Total: 2,471
  - Density: 7,122.6/sq mi (2,750.06/km^{2})
- Time zone: UTC−05:00 (EST)
  - Summer (DST): UTC−04:00 (EDT)
- ZIP Code: 18237
- Area code: 570
- FIPS code: 42-45824

McAdoo is a borough and coal town in Schuylkill County, Pennsylvania, United States, 5 miles (8.0 km) south of Hazleton and seven miles north of Tamaqua. McAdoo contains the picturesque Silver Brook Meadow. In the past, anthracite coal mining and a shirt factory, the McAdoo Manufacturing Company, provided gainful employment to the populace. The population was 2,477 at the 2020 census.

== Geography ==
According to the United States Census Bureau, the borough has a total area of 0.3 square miles (0.78 km^{2}), all land. McAdoo's elevation is 1700 feet above sea level. It is on the crest of Broad Mountain and straddles the divide between the Delaware and Susquehanna watersheds. Pennsylvania Route 309 (Kennedy Drive) is the main north-to-south thoroughfare. Interstate 81 runs a short distance west of town and parallel to PA 309. The two routes have an access highway connecting them just south of McAdoo at exit 138 of I-81. McAdoo has a warm-summer humid continental climate (Dfb) and the hardiness zone is 6a. Average monthly temperatures range from 23.5 °F in January to 70.1 °F in July.

== Demographics ==
Historical population
Census	Pop.	Note	%±
1900	2,122		—
1910	3,389		59.7%
1920	4,674		37.9%
1930	5,239		12.1%
1940	5,127		−2.1%
1950	4,260		−16.9%
1960	3,560		−16.4%
1970	3,326		−6.6%
1980	2,940		−11.6%
1990	2,459		−16.4%
2000	2,274		−7.5%
2010	2,300		1.1%
2020	2,471		7.4%
2021 (est.)	2,476	▲	0.2%

At the 2000 census there were 2,274 people, 1,034 households, and 617 families residing in the borough. The population density was 6,916.7 inhabitants per square mile (2,670.6/km^{2}). There were 1,211 housing units at an average density of 3,683.4 per square mile (1,422.2/km^{2}). The racial makeup of the borough was 99.47% White, 0.09% African American, 0.04% Native American, 0.04% Asian, 0.31% from other races, and 0.04% from two or more races. Hispanic or Latino of any race were 0.66%.

The most common ancestries in McAdoo are Polish (15.5%), Italian (14.1%), Slovak (10.6%), Irish (7.8%), and Greek (5.0%)

Of the 1,034 households, 23.8% had children under the age of 18 living with them, 42.5% were married couples living together, 12.0% had a female householder with no husband present, and 40.3% were non-families. 37.1% of households were one person, and 20.9% were one person aged 65 or older. The average household size was 2.19 and the average family size was 2.89.

In the borough the population was spread out, with 20.6% under the age of 18, 6.1% from 18 to 24, 28.4% from 25 to 44, 21.5% from 45 to 64, and 23.3% 65 or older. The median age was 41 years. For every 100 females, there were 91.1 males. For every 100 females age 18 and over, there were 87.0 males.

The median household income was $25,721 and the median family income was $31,625. Males had a median income of $28,281 versus $21,096 for females. The per capita income for the borough was $14,723. About 9.1% of families and 14.5% of the population were below the poverty line, including 24.7% of those under age 18 and 12.6% of those age 65 or over.

== Education ==
The Hazleton Area School District covers the borough. It operates McAdoo-Kelayres Elementary-Middle School in McAdoo, which also serves Kelayres. All McAdoo residents are zoned to the Hazleton Area High School in Hazle Township.

== Transportation ==
STS bus route 45 runs between Pottsville and McAdoo via Tamaqua. On Wednesdays, the Hometown auction bus 47 runs from Pottsville via Frackville, Shenandoah, and Mahanoy City to Hometown and McAdoo. Hazleton Public Transit bus route 10 serves McAdoo and Tresckow. There is also a route in the Uptown Vans network which connects McAdoo to Paterson, New Jersey and New York City.
