= Hazleton Area High School =

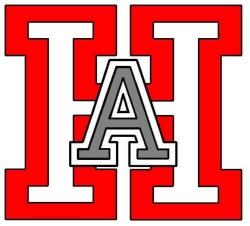

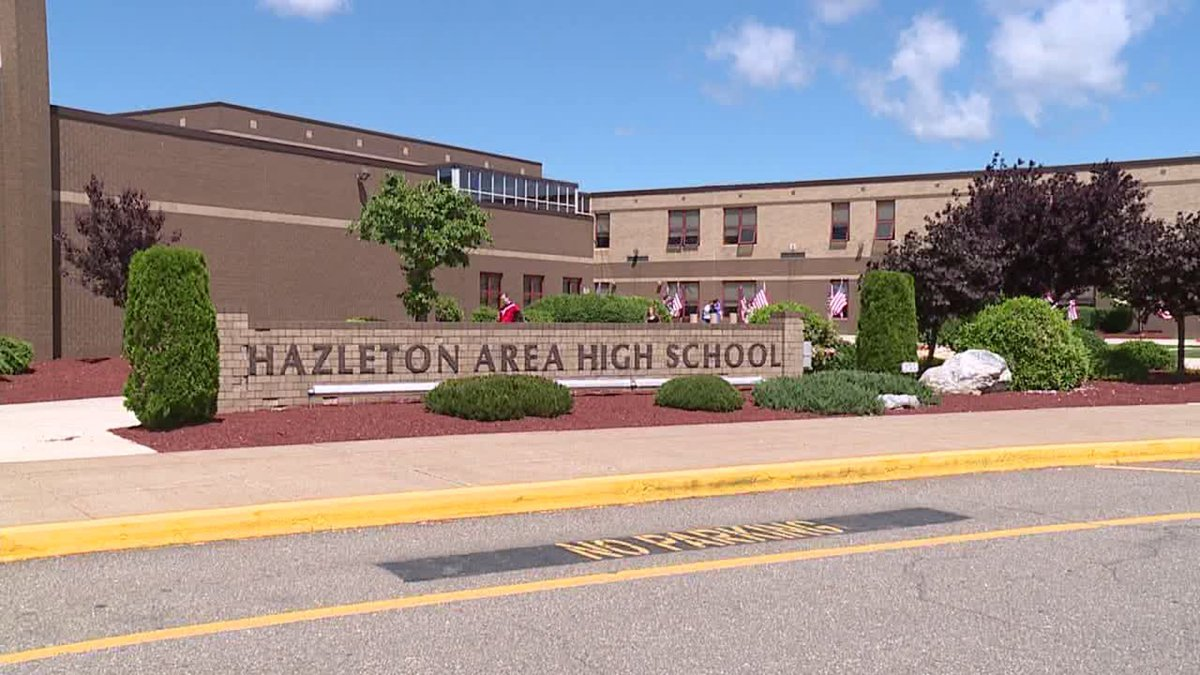
- Hazleton Area High School in June 2018

Location
- 1601 W 23rd Street, Hazle Township, Pennsylvania 18202, U.S. Hazle Township, Pennsylvania; United States; 40.9720°N 75.9953°W

Information
- Type: Public high school
- Opened: 1992
- NCES School ID: 421170000026
- Faculty: 201.3 (on an FTE basis)
- Grades: 9-12
- Enrollment: 3,884 (2023-24)
- Student to teacher ratio: 19.29
- Colors: Red, silver, and white
- Mascot: Cougar
- Website: https://www.hasdk12.org/o/hahs

Hazleton Area High School (HAHS) is a public high school located in Hazle Township, Pennsylvania and is part of the Hazleton Area School District. As of the 2023-24 school year, the school had 3,884 students, according to National Center for Education Statistics data.

== History ==
Between 1966 and 1992, Hazleton Area School District closed all of its high schools except for Hazleton, Freeland, and West Hazleton High Schools. The Hazleton Area High School opened at 1601 West 23rd Street beginning in the 1992–1993 school year, which resulted in the complete consolidation of all remaining area high schools.

== Athletics ==
Boys

- Baseball - AAAAAA
- Basketball - AAAAAA
- Bowling - AAAAAA
- Cross Country - AAA
- Football - AAAAAA
- Golf - AAA
- Soccer - AAAA
- Swimming and Diving- AAA
- Tennis - AAA
- Track and Field - AAA
- Volleyball - AAA
- Water Polo - AAAA
- Wrestling - AAA
- Total Boys Varsity Sports : 13

Girls

- Basketball - AAAAAA
- Bowling - AAAAAA
- Cross Country- AAA
- Field Hockey - AAA
- Lacrosse - AAA
- Soccer - AAAA
- Softball - AAAAAA
- Swimming and Diving - AAA
- Tennis - AAA
- Track and Field - AAA
- Volleyball - AAAA
- Water Polo - AAAA
- Golf - AAA
- Wrestling - AAA
- Total Girls Varsity Sports : 13

== Notable alumni ==
- Lou Barletta, former U.S. Congressman
- Nate Eachus, former professional football player, Kansas City Chiefs
- George Kracum, former professional football player, Brooklyn Dodgers (NFL)
- Norm Larker, former professional baseball player, Los Angeles Dodgers and Milwaukee Brewers
- John Yaccino, former professional football player, Buffalo Bills
