= McCarthy (surname) =

McCarthy is a surname originating from the Irish noble McCarthy Clan of County Cork, Ireland. The surname, meaning "son of Cárthach" originated in Ireland. Commons variants of the name include McCarty and MacCarthy. Sixty percent of people with the surname in Ireland itself originate from County Cork, where the family was very powerful in the Middle Ages.

== Notable people with the surname "McCarthy" ==
=== A ===
- Andre McCarthy (born 1987), Jamaican cricketer
- Andrew McCarthy (born 1962), American actor
- Andrew McCarthy (footballer) (born 1998), Scottish footballer
- Andrew C. McCarthy (born 1959), American attorney and columnist
- Annette McCarthy (1958–2023), American actress
- Arch McCarthy, American baseball pitcher

=== B ===
- Barry McCarthy, Irish cricketer
- Barry C. McCarthy (born 1963), American business executive
- Benni McCarthy (born 1977), South African footballer
- Bernard McCarthy (1874–1948) New Zealand cricketer, lawyer and papal knight
- Bernie McCarthy (1943–2019), Australian rules footballer
- Billy McCarthy (boxer) (1854–1931), English-born Australian boxer
- Brandon McCarthy (born 1983), American baseball pitcher

=== C ===
- Callum McCarthy (born 1944), British economist
- Carlton McCarthy, American politician, Mayor of Richmond, Virginia
- Carlton McCarthy (singer), British singer
- Carolyn McCarthy (1944–2025), American congresswoman
- Cathal McCarthy (footballer), Irish footballer
- Charles McCarthy (disambiguation), multiple people
- Chris McCarthy (racewalker) (1931–2009), American racewalker
- Claire McCarthy (born 1976), Irish marathon runner
- Clem McCarthy (1882–1962), American sports announcer
- Colman McCarthy (1938–2026), American journalist and peace activist
- Con McCarthy (1893–1975), Australian rules footballer
- Con McCarthy (rugby league) (1894–1968), New Zealand rugby league player
- Cormac McCarthy (1933–2023), Pulitzer Prize-winning American novelist

=== D ===
- Dalton McCarthy (1836–1898), Canadian lawyer and politician
- Daniel McCarthy (disambiguation), multiple people
- David McCarthy (disambiguation), multiple people
- Dennis McCarthy (composer) (born 1945), composer of film scores
- Di McCarthy (died 2025), New Zealand neuroscientist and science administrator
- Dominic McCarthy (1892–1975), Australian recipient of the Victoria Cross
- Don McCarthy (1955–2018), British entrepreneur
- Douglas McCarthy (1966–2025), English singer
- Dudley McCarthy (1911–1987), Australian military historian and soldier

=== E ===
- E. Jerome McCarthy marketing scholar and inventor of 4Ps of marketing
- Earl McCarthy (born 1969), Irish freestyle swimmer
- Ellis McCarthy (born 1994), American football player
- Eric McCarthy (born 1983), Irish musician and songwriter
- Eugene McCarthy (1916–2005), U.S. congressman and senator

=== F ===
- Fabian "Fabe" McCarthy (1919–2008), Australian rugby union player
- Francis X. McCarthy (born 1942), American actor
- Fintan McCarthy (born 1996), Irish Rower

=== G ===
- Garry McCarthy (born 1959), American police administrator in Newark and Chicago
- Gina McCarthy (born 1954), 13th Administrator of the Environmental Protection Agency
- Glenn McCarthy (1907–1988), American oil tycoon and businessman

=== H ===
- Harry McCarthy, variety entertainer, wrote "The Bonnie Blue Flag" in 1861

=== J ===
- J. J. McCarthy (born 2003), American football player
- J. Michael McCarthy (born c. 1952), American mechanical engineer
- J. P. McCarthy (1933–1995), American radio personality
- J. Thomas McCarthy (born 1937), American educator, author and attorney
- Jake McCarthy (born 1997), American baseball player
- James McCarthy (disambiguation), multiple people
- Jenny McCarthy (born 1972), American anti-vaccine activist and former Playboy model and actress
- Joanne McCarthy (disambiguation), multiple people
- Joe McCarthy (manager) (1887–1978), American baseball manager
- John McCarthy (disambiguation), multiple people
- John McCarthy (composer) (born 1961), composer of film scores
- John James McCarthy (1921–1996) Chief of Special Services Fort Sam Houston Texas, Ret Major US Army
- Joseph McCarthy (1908–1957), American politician and senator
- Joseph McCarthy (disambiguation), multiple people
- Justin McCarthy (disambiguation), multiple people

=== K ===
- Kate McCarthy (born 1992), Australian rules footballer
- Kate McCarthy (disambiguation), multiple people
- Katie McCarthy (disambiguation), multiple people
- Kevin Owen McCarthy (born 1965), 55th Speaker of the United States House of Representatives
- Kevin McCarthy (actor) (1914–2010), film actor
- Kevin McCarthy (baseball) (born 1992), baseball player
- Kevin McCarthy (cricketer) (born 1945), Australian cricketer
- Kevin McCarthy (director), American television director
- Kevin McCarthy (historian), American historian
- Kevin McCarthy (ice hockey) (born 1957), Canadian ice hockey player and assistant coach
- Kevin McCarthy (radio), Texas radio personality

=== L ===
- Leo T. McCarthy (1930–2007), Californian politician and businessman
- Leslie McCarthy (1885–1962), Irish-British physician and British Army officer
- Lincoln McCarthy (born 1993), Australian rules footballer
- Liam McCarthy (disambiguation), several people

=== M ===
- Maeve McCarthy, Irish mathematician
- Margaret McCarthy, Irish-American migrant
- Mary McCarthy (disambiguation), multiple people
- Matt McCarthy (disambiguation), multiple people
- Melissa McCarthy (born 1970), American actress and comedian
- Michael McCarthy (disambiguation), multiple people
- Mick McCarthy (born 1959), English football player and manager
- Mick McCarthy (footballer, born 1911), Irish footballer
- Mick McCarthy (Gaelic footballer) (1965–1998), Irish Gaelic footballer
- Mike McCarthy (born 1963), American football coach

=== N ===
- Nicholas McCarthy (disambiguation), multiple people
- Nobu McCarthy (1934–2002), Japanese-Canadian actress and model

=== P ===
- Patrick McCarthy (disambiguation), multiple people
- Paul McCarthy (born 1945), American contemporary artist
- Pete McCarthy (1951–2004), pen name of Peter Charles Robinson, British broadcaster and travel writer
- Peter McCarthy (industrialist) (1845–1919), American industrialist and philanthropist

=== Q ===
- Quintin McCarty (born 2003), American swimmer

=== R ===
- Rachel McCarthy (born 1984), English poet, critic and broadcaster
- Rashawn McCarthy (born 1989), Filipino-American basketball player
- Richard McCarthy (disambiguation), multiple people
- Rick McCarthy (disambiguation), multiple people
- Robert McCarthy (disambiguation), multiple people
- Rory McCarthy, (born 1975), Irish hurler

=== S ===
- Shaun Lloyd McCarthy (1928–2000), aka Desmond Cory, British novelist and screenwriter
- Stephen McCarthy (disambiguation), multiple people
- Steve McCarthy (boxer) (born 1962), British boxer
- Steve McCarthy (ice hockey) (born 1981), Canadian ice hockey player

=== T ===
- Thaddeus McCarthy (1455–1492), Irish bishop
- Thaddeus McCarthy (jurist) (1907–2001), New Zealand jurist
- Thomas McCarthy (disambiguation), multiple people
- Tim McCarthy (born 1949), US Secret Service agent injured in assassination attempt on President Reagan
- Tom McCarthy (director) (born 1966), American film director, screenwriter, and actor
- Tom McCarthy (novelist) (born 1969), English novelist
- Tom McCarthy (sportscaster) (born 1968), American sportscaster
- Tom McCarthy (trade unionist) (c. 1862–1899) British Irish trade unionist
- Tommy McCarthy (baseball) (1863–1922), American baseball player

=== W ===
- Walter T. McCarthy (1898–1985), American lawyer and judge
- William Hilgrove Leslie McCarthy (1885–1962), Irish-British physician and British Army officer
- Winston McCarthy (1908–1984), New Zealand radio sports commentator

== Spelled "McCarty" ==
=== A-E ===
- Bobby McCarty (born 1992), American racing driver
- Calvin McCarty (born 1984), Canadian football running back
- Carolyn A. McCarty (fl. 2019), American psychologist
- Daniel T. McCarty (1912–53), American politician
- Darren McCarty (born 1972), Canadian hockey player
- David McCarty (born 1969), American baseball player
- David McCarty (American football) (born 1987), American football player
- Dax McCarty (born 1987), American soccer player
- Ernest McCarty (born 1941), American musician and playwright

=== H-M ===
- Henry "Billy the Kid" McCarty (1859–1881), American outlaw
- J. D. McCarty (1916–1980), American politician from Oklahoma
- Jim McCarty (born 1943), English pop/rock musician
- Jim McCarty (guitarist) (born 1947), American blues/rock musician
- John McCarty (fl. 1880s), American baseball player
- John McCarty (New York) (1782–1851), New York politician
- Ken McCarty (born 1958), American politician
- Kirk McCarty (born 1995), American baseball player
- Leon McCarty (1888–1962), American college sports coach
- Luther McCarty (1892–1913), American heavyweight boxer
- Maclyn McCarty (1911–2005), American geneticist
- Mary McCarty (1923–1980), American actress, singer, dancer, and comedian
- Mary McCarty (1931–2009), All-American Girls Professional Baseball League player

=== R-Z ===
- Richard McCarty (disambiguation), several people
- Ted McCarty (1910–2001), American electric guitar maker
- Walter McCarty (born 1974), American basketball player
- William M. McCarty (c. 1789–1863), American politician
- Winston H. McCarty (1928–2025), American politician

== Spelled "MacCarthy" ==
- Denis Florence MacCarthy (1818–1882), Irish poet, translator, and biographer
- Desmond MacCarthy (1878–1952), English critic
- Fiona MacCarthy (1940–2020), British biographer and cultural historian

== Fictional characters ==
- Dwight McCarthy

== See also ==
- McCarthy, a disambiguation page for "McCarthy"
