= Clan Carthy =

Clan Carthy or Clancarthy may refer to:

- MacCarthy dynasty, Gaelic clan of Munster, Ireland
- Earl of Clancarty, title in the Peerage of Ireland
- Earl of Clancare, title in the Peerage of Ireland

== See also ==
- Carthy, surname
- McCarthy (disambiguation)
