= In Druí Ua Cárthaigh =

- Died: 1097
- Writing career
- Genre: Poet

In Druí Ua Cárthaigh (died 1097) was Chief Poet of Connacht.

== Overview ==
The Annals of the Four Masters state, sub anno 1097, that "The Druid Ua Carthaigh, chief poet of Connaught, was killed by the Connaughtmen themselves." No surviving poems are ascribed to him. The forename In Druí was his name, and does not denote that he was a druid.

A previous member of the family, Muireadhach Ua Cárthaigh, was in 1067 "drowned in Loch Calgaich." He was described as "the chief poet and chief ollamh of Connaught." In 1131 "Feardana Ua Cárthaigh, chief poet of Connaught", was killed at the battle of Loch Semhdighdhe in Mide.

The Ua Carthaigh (anglicised Carthy) family were located in Ui Maine, though apparently not members of the dynasty.

== See also ==
- Ó Cárthaigh
- Michael Carty (1916–1975), Irish politician.

Preceded by Muireadhach Ua Cárthaigh	Chief Poet of Connacht; 1067?–1097	Succeeded by Gilla na Naemh Ua Dunabhra
