= Charles McCarthy =

Charles or Charlie McCarthy, MacCarthy or M'Carthy may refer to:

- Charles MacCarthy, 1st Viscount Muskerry (died 1641)
- Charles MacCarty, Viscount Muskerry (died 1665), Irish noble and soldier in French and English service
- Charles MacCarthy (politician) (died 1704), Irish Jacobite politician
- Charles MacCarthy (British Army officer) (1764–1824), Irish soldier and British colonial governor
- Sir Charles Justin MacCarthy (1811–1864), governor of British Ceylon
- Charles William McCarthy (1848–1919), Irish musician and writer
- Charles J. McCarthy (1861–1929), fifth territorial governor of Hawai'i
- Charles McCarthy (progressive) (1873–1921), Wisconsin progressive reformer and political scientist, Georgia football coach
- Charles F. McCarthy (1876–1938), mayor of Marlborough, Massachusetts
- Charles P. McCarthy (1881–1950), chief justice of the Idaho Supreme Court
- Charlie McCarthy (ice hockey) (1889–1969), Canadian ice hockey player and boxer
- Charles McCarthy (cricketer) (1899–1977), English cricketer
- Charlie McCarthy (hurler) (born 1946), Irish hurler
- Charlie McCarthy (Gaelic footballer) (born c. 1977), Irish Gaelic footballer for Gneeveguilla
- Charles McCarthy (fighter) (born 1980), American mixed martial arts fighter
- Charlie McCarthy, best known of the puppets used by ventriloquist Edgar Bergen
