= Gneeveguilla =

Village in County Kerry, Ireland

Gneeveguilla Irish: Gníomh go Leith
- Village
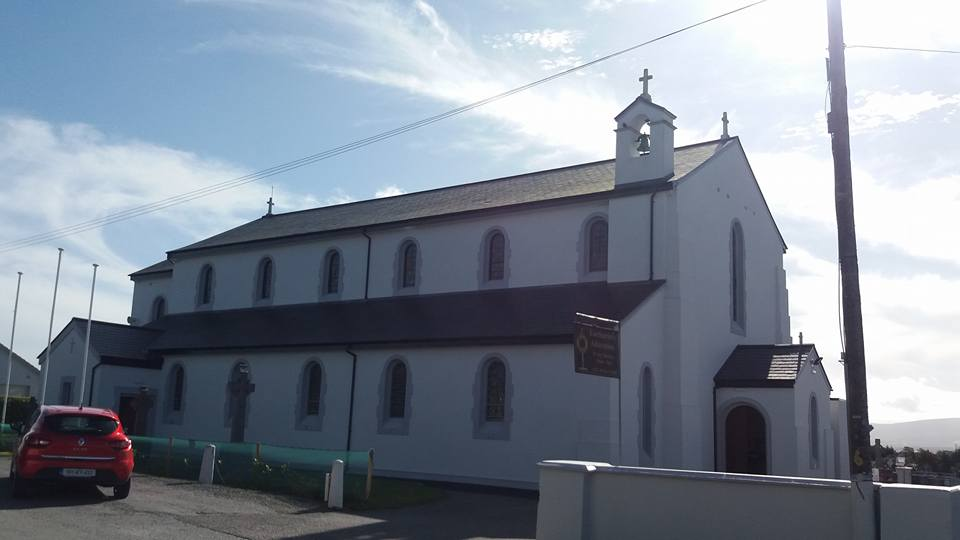
- Church of the Holy Rosary

- Location in Ireland
- Coordinates: 52°07′01″N 9°16′19″W
- Country: Ireland
- Province: Munster
- County: County Kerry

Population (2022)
  - Total: 300
- Time zone: UTC+0 (WET)
  - Summer (DST): UTC-1 (IST (WEST))

Gneeveguilla (/ɡniːvˈɡʊɪlə/ g-NEEV-guilla, locally pronounced /ɡiniːɡˈʊɪlə/ guinea-guilla), officially Gneevgullia (Irish: Gníomh go Leith), is a small village in the Sliabh Luachra region of East County Kerry, Ireland. It lies about 19 km (12 mi) east of Killarney, close to the County Kerry/County Cork border.

== Location ==
Gneeveguilla is situated in a region of hills and valleys and serves a rural hinterland consisting of dairy farms, pastureland and peatland. Townlands in the area include Coom (Lower and Upper), Bawnard, Gullaun, Mausrower and Lisheen. At Mausrower, there used to be a large quarry in the early part of the 20th century, the remnants of which can be seen today on the approach from the Killarney direction towards Lower Coom. Hence the junction at Lower Coom being known as the Quarry Cross.

== History ==
In the 19th century Gneeveguilla was the scene of an event known as the 'Moving Bog'. On the night of Sunday 28 December 1896, after a prolonged period of bad weather, sleeping families were awakened by an unusual sound. When daylight broke, to their horror they realised that over 200 acres (0.81 km^{2}) of bogland was on the move in a southerly direction, taking everything before it. It followed the course of the River Ownachree into the River Flesk. The bog continued to move until New Year's Day and came to rest covering hundreds of acres of pastureland. The Moving Bog claimed the lives of eight members of one local family.

The Church of the Holy Rosary is a Roman Catholic church in Gneeveguilla opened on 10 October 1937. It is one of three churches in the Rathmore Parish of the Diocese of Kerry.

== Education ==
Gneeveguilla National School (Irish: Scoil Naisiunta Gniomh Go Leith) is a Catholic, co-educational national (primary) school in the centre of Gneevguilla, directly across from the Gaelic Athletic Association (GAA) pitch and athletics centre.

Two smaller primary schools in the hinterland previously served the local populace. One of these, Tureencahill National School closed in 2014 due to insufficient student numbers. The former school building now serves as a digital hub and centre for a local community group.

== Music and culture ==
Several exponents of the 'Sliabh Luachra style' of traditional Irish music come from the Gneeveguilla area, including fiddler players Julia Clifford, Denis Murphy and Johnny and Paddy Cronin; and button accordion player Johnny O'Leary.

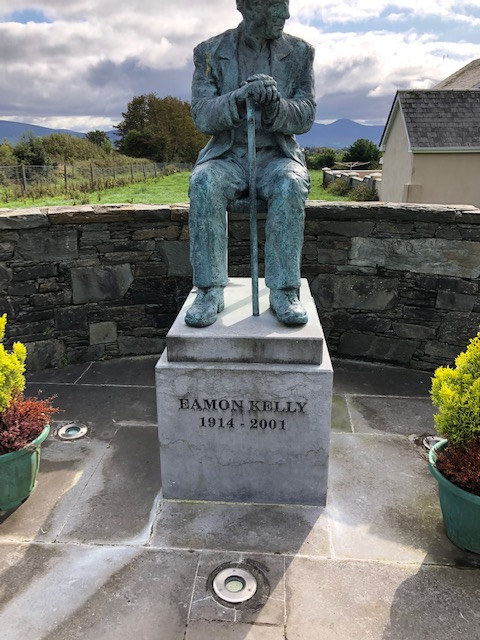
Statue of Eamon Kelly in Gneevguilla

There is a statue in the village in honour of the Sliabh Luachra seanchaí (storyteller) Éamon Kelly (1914–2001).

== Sports ==
Gneeveguilla GAA is the local GAA club which plays in the East Kerry GAA division. Gneeveguilla is home to Ambrose O'Donovan, a former captain of the Kerry senior football team which won the 'Centenary All-Ireland' All-Ireland Senior Football Championship. Gneeveguilla won the Kerry Intermediate Football Championship in 2010. They then went on to win the Munster Championship and lost the All-Ireland semi-final to St. James of County Galway, after a period of extra time.

Other local sports clubs include Gneeveguilla Athletics Club. Established in 1978, it has had success at local and national levels. Quarry Park Rangers is a local association football (soccer) club. Founded in 1982, the club fields teams in the Kerry District Leagues. A previous soccer club, Gneeveguila FC, were crowned Premier B Champions in 1974. Gneeveguilla's basketball club was founded in 2007.

== Development ==
In Kerry County Council's "South East Kerry Settlements Local Area Plan 2008–2015", a number of opportunities for the future development of Gneeveguilla were identified. The plan recommended against scattered and ribbon development, as well as environmental and pedestrian safety improvements.

== Notable people ==
- Julia Clifford (1914–1997), traditional musician.
- Paddy Cronin (1925–2014), fiddler.
- Eamon Kelly (1914–2001), actor and storyteller.
- Denis Murphy (1910–1974), traditional musician.
- Liam Murphy, Gaelic footballer.
- Ambrose O'Donovan (b.1962), Gaelic footballer.
- Charlie McCarthy, Gaelic footballer.
- Aogán Ó Rathaille (c.1670–1726), poet born at Scrahanaveal near Gneeveguilla.
- Eoghan Rua Ó Súilleabháin (1748–1782), poet.

== See also ==
- List of towns and villages in Ireland
