= Gilla na Naemh Ua Dunabhra =

Gilla na Naemh Ua Dunabhra (died 1101) was Chief Poet of Connacht, Ireland.

The Annals of the Four Masters state, sub anno 1101, that "Gilla-na-naemh Ua Dunabhra, chief poet of Connacht, died."

The previous chief poet of the kingdom, In Druí Ua Carthaigh, had died in 1097.

No known surviving poems are ascribed to Ua Dunabhra. His origins are uncertain.

Preceded by In Druí Ua Carthaigh	Chief Poet of Connacht; 1097–1101	Succeeded by Feardana Ua Carthaigh
