= Aodh Ollbhar Ó Cárthaigh =

Gaelic-Irish poet

Aodh Ollabhar Ó Carrthoidh a.k.a. Aodh Ollbhar Ó Cárthaigh, Gaelic-Irish poet, fl. mid-15th century.

== Overview ==
Ó Cárthaigh was an Irish poet who was active sometime in the middle years of the 15th century. His family were natives of Uí Maine.

He is known from a single surviving poem, Tosach féile fairsinge, which survives in the following manuscripts:

- NLS Adv 72/1/37 Bk Dean Lism. first half of the 16th century
- RIA 743 (A/iv/3) 17th century
- RIA 785(23/G/8)T.ONeachtain et al.1711
- RIA3(23/L/17) S. OMurch.na R. 1744-5

It was published in 1938. It concerns the families of Ó Maol Ruanaidh rí Céise and Mac Diarmata of Moylurg. It mentions Tomhaltach Mac Diarmuda/mac na ríoghna ó Ráith Chruachan, and so may date from during or after Tomhaltach's lifetime. Rulers of Moylurg named Tomaltach were:

- Tomaltach na Cairge mac Diarmata, ruled 1196-1207
- Tomaltach Cear mac Diarmata, 1331–1336
- Tomaltach an Einigh mac Diarmata, 1421–1458

The Bardic Poetry Database lists the subject of the poem as Tomaltach mc Conch.mhcAodha mhcCon MacDiarmada, who died in 1458.

Other poems by Ó Cárthaigh may survive, but if so, are unattributed.

== See also ==
- Muireadhach Ua Cárthaigh (died 1067) was Chief Poet of Connacht
