= Ó Cárthaigh =

Ó Cárthaigh was the name of a Gaelic-Irish family located in Ui Maine, though apparently not members of the dynasty. As Carty, it is still found in County Galway and County Roscommon.

== See also ==
- Muireadhach Ua Cárthaigh (died 1067) was Chief Poet of Connacht.
- Feardana Ua Cárthaigh (died 1131), Chief Poet of Connacht.
- Feardana Ua Cárthaigh (died 1131), Chief Poet of Connacht.
- Aodh Ollbhar Ó Cárthaigh (fl. 15th century), poet.
- Michael Carty (1916–1975), Irish politician.
