= Great Performances =

Television series

- Genre: Performing arts
- Created by: Jac Venza
- Directed by: Steve Ruggi
- Presented by: Hal Holbrook; Walter Cronkite; Julie Andrews
- Theme music composer: John Williams
- Country of origin: United States
- Original language: English
- No. of seasons: 51

Production
- Production company: WNET/Thirteen New York

Original release
- Network: PBS
- Release: November 4, 1972 – present

Related
- Masterpiece

Great Performances is a television anthology series dedicated to the performing arts; the banner has been used to televise plays, musicals, opera, ballet, concerts, as well as occasional documentaries. It is produced by the PBS member station WNET/Thirteen in New York City (originally in conjunction with KQED/San Francisco, WTTW/Chicago, Maryland Public Television, South Carolina ETV and KERA-TV/Dallas/Fort Worth).

The series is the longest-running performing arts anthology on television and has won 29 Primetime Emmy Awards, three Peabody Awards, and an Image Award, with nods from the Directors Guild of America and the Cinema Audio Society.

== History ==
Logo used in 1985 through 1991 with the National Endowment for the Arts.

Great Performances' predecessor, New York Playhouse, premiered on October 7, 1972, with a production of Antigone. In 1973, Exxon and the Corporation for Public Broadcasting provided grants to create Theater in America, which reran the New York Playhouse and some NET Playhouse productions. The first original production for Theater in America was of Enemies. In 1974, WNET added The Great Performance, a series of classical concerts.

In 1976, Great Performances became the umbrella title and the music section was named Music in America. A third section, Dance in America, was also added. The first episode, "Sue's Leg: Remembering the Thirties", featured choreography by Twyla Tharp. Later episodes featured such performers as Mikhail Baryshnikov. Although it is not seen as often as previously, there have recently been new Dance in America programs, such as the Emmy-winning 2005 production of Tchaikovsky's Swan Lake, starring Angel Corella, Gillian Murphy, and the American Ballet Theatre.

In 2007, Great Performances began telecasting performances from the Metropolitan Opera Live in HD series, a series of HD opera tapings repurposed from their original purpose as Fathom Events films carried in high-quality movie theaters for a premium admission price.

Repeat guest hosts include Walter Cronkite, Julie Andrews, Whoopi Goldberg, and Hugh Bonneville. Major underwriters have included The National Endowment for the Arts, The Corporation for Public Broadcasting, PBS viewers, Exxon, Martin Marietta, Texaco, Deluxe, Duracell, Ernst & Young, Chase Manhattan Bank, and UBS.

In 2009, new theme music for Great Performances was introduced, composed by John Williams.

On October 18, 2013, Great Performances celebrated its 40th anniversary with the release of the episode "Great Performances 40th Anniversary Celebration". The episode was taped at Lincoln Center for the Performing Arts in November 2012 and dedicated to the memory of Phil Ramone, who died from complications due to surgery in March 2013.

== Critical reception ==
Great Performances has received generally positive reviews from television critics. Roger Catlin of the Hartford Courant called it "The classiest thing on TV". Ryan Berenz of Channel Guide Magazine wrote of the episode "Annie Lennox: Nostalgia Live in Concert", "Annie Lennox brings the house down". Linda Winer of Newsday called the episode "Billy Elliot" "As good as it gets". Melanie McFarland of Salon.com called the episode "Hamilton's America", "Enthralling [and] uplifting". Marissa Martinelli of Slate called the episode "An American in Paris" "spectacular".
