= Justin McCarthy =

Justin McCarthy may refer to:

- Justin McCarthy (politician) (1830–1912), Irish nationalist, historian and UK Member of Parliament
- Justin McCarthy (ice hockey) (1899–1976), US ice hockey player
- Justin McCarthy (artist) (1891–1977), American artist
- Justin McCarthy (footballer) (1894–1981), Australian rules footballer
- Justin McCarthy (hurler) (born 1945), former Irish hurling manager and player
- Justin McCarthy (American historian) (born 1945), American demographer and professor of history
- Justin McCarthy (dancer) (born 1957), American-born Bharatanatyam dancer
- Justin Huntly McCarthy (1859–1936), Irish nationalist and UK Member of Parliament
- Fred McCarthy (cartoonist) (Justin McCarthy, 1918–2009), American cartoonist
- Justin McCarthy, Viscount Mountcashel (died 1694), Jacobite general in the Williamite War in Ireland
- Justin J. McCarthy (1900–1959), American prelate of the Roman Catholic Church
- Justin C. McCarthy (born 1977) Irish risk manager, Chief Executive of the Professional Risk Managers' International Association
