= Eamon Kelly (actor) =

Irish actor and playwright

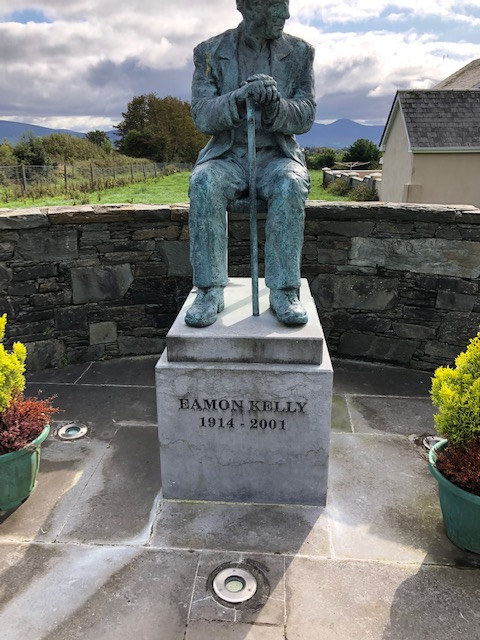
- Statue of Kelly in Gneeveguilla, County Kerry
- Born: 30 March 1914; Sliabh Luachra, Ireland
- Died: 24 October 2001 (aged 87); Dublin, Ireland
- Occupations: Actor and playwright

Eamon Kelly (30 March 1914 – 24 October 2001) was an Irish actor and playwright. In 1966, he received a Tony Award nomination for his performance in the 1964 play Philadelphia, Here I Come!.

== Childhood ==
Kelly was born in Gneeveguilla, Sliabh Luachra, County Kerry, Ireland. The son of Ned Kelly and Johanna Cashman, Kelly left school at age 14 to become an apprentice carpenter to his father, a wheelwright. He first became interested in acting after viewing a production of Juno and the Paycock.

== Career ==
Kelly was an actor and storyteller who became a member of the RTÉ actors group, the Radio Éireann Players, in 1952. He is best known for his performances of storytelling on stage, radio, and television. He was discovered as a story-teller by Mícheál Ó hAodha, then Director of Drama and Variety, following an informal performance at a Radio Éireann Players' party.

As an actor, he worked extensively with both the Gate Theatre and Abbey Theatre in Dublin. He was nominated for a 1966 Tony Award in the category Actor, Supporting, or Featured (Dramatic) for his role in Brian Friel's Philadelphia, Here I Come. He appeared on film in A Portrait of the Artist as a Young Man (1977).

He recorded Legends of Ireland with Rosaleen Linehan in 1985.

== Filmography ==
| Year | Title | Role | Notes |
|---|---|---|---|
| 1965 | Young Cassidy | Feeney | |
| 1978 | On a Paving Stone Mounted | | |
| 1981 | Excalibur | Abbot | |
| 1999 | White Pony | Uafas | (final film role) |

== Bibliography ==
Ireland's Master Storyteller: The Collected Stories of Eamon Kelly

In My Father's Time: An Evening of Storytelling

The rub of a relic

Bless me father

== Autobiography ==
Eamon Kelly: The Storyteller: An Autobiography

== See also ==
- Seanchaí - Traditional Irish storyteller, which Kelly often portrayed
