= John Carthy =

John Carthy may refer to:

- John Dennis Carthy (1923–1972), British zoologist and ethologist
- John Carthy (1972–2000), Irish man killed by the police in controversial circumstances
