= Stephen McCarthy =

Stephen or Steven McCarthy may refer to:

- Stephen A. McCarthy (1908–1990), American librarian
- Stephen McCarthy (Australian footballer) (born 1962), Australian footballer
- Steve McCarthy (boxer) (1962–2017), British boxer
- Steve McCarthy (ice hockey) (born 1981), Canadian hockey player
- Stephen McCarthy (musician), guitarist with The Long Ryders
- Stephen McCarthy (soccer) (born 1988), American soccer player
- Steven McCarthy (actor), Canadian actor and filmmaker
