= Weatherly Area School District =

School district in Pennsylvania

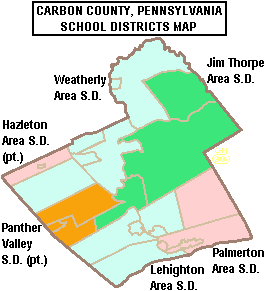
- Location of Weatherly Area School District in Carbon County, Pennsylvania

Address
- 602 Sixth Street Weatherly, Carbon County, Pennsylvania, 18255; United States

District information
- Type: Public
- Budget: $14.9 million
- NCES District ID: 4225140

Students and staff
- Students: 613 (2021-22)
- Faculty: 46.00 (on an FTE basis)
- Student–teacher ratio: 13.33

Other information
- Website: weatherlysd.org

The Weatherly Area School District is a public school district in Carbon County, Pennsylvania. It is centered on Weatherly and also serves the borough of East Side, plus Lehigh, Packer, Lausanne, and northern Kidder Townships. The district features one elementary school, one middle school, and one high school.

== Athletics ==
The school offers soccer, cross country, golf, and volleyball in the fall. In the winter, students can play basketball. In the spring, students can play baseball, softball, or track and field.
