= Ambrose O'Donovan =

Irish Gaelic footballer

Personal information
- Native name: Ambrós Ó Donnabháin (Irish)
- Nickname: Rosie
- Born: 11 June 1962 (age 64) Gneeveguilla, County Kerry
- Height: 6 ft 2 in (188 cm)

Sport
- Sport: Gaelic football
- Position: Midfield
Club
- Years: Club
- 1970s-1990s: Gneeveguilla
Club titles
- Kerry titles: 0
Inter-county
Years	County	Apps (scores)
1984-1992	Kerry	26 (1-06)
Inter-county titles
- Munster titles: 4
- All-Irelands: 3
- NFL: 0
- All Stars: 0

Ambrose 'Rosie' O'Donovan (born 11 June 1962 in Gneeveguilla, County Kerry) is an Irish former sportsperson. He played Gaelic football with his local club Gneeveguilla and was a member of the Kerry senior inter-county team from 1984 until 1992. O'Donovan captained Kerry to the centenary-year All-Ireland title in 1984.

O'Donovan was captain of the Kerry team which won the 1984 'Centenary All-Ireland' All-Ireland Senior Football Championship. O'Donovan was one of the youngest captains of an All Ireland winning side. He played alongside Jack O'Shea at midfield in two more successful campaigns during 1985 and 1986.

During his school years, he won two All-Ireland Vocational Schools medals with Kerry. He also won an All Ireland Minor medal in 1980.

O'Donovan played club football with Gneeveguilla and won three O'Donoghue Cups in 1979, 1980 and 1983. He also helped the local club side win the Kerry Club Championship in 1980 beating formidable Kerry clubs such as Austin Stacks and Castleisland Desmonds.

Sporting positions
Preceded by Diarmuid O'Donoghue	Kerry Senior Football Captain; 1984	Succeeded by Páidí Ó Sé
Achievements
Preceded by Tommy Drumm (Dublin)	All-Ireland Senior Football winning captain 1984	Succeeded by Páidí Ó Sé (Kerry)
