= Weatherly, Pennsylvania =

Borough in Pennsylvania, US

- Borough
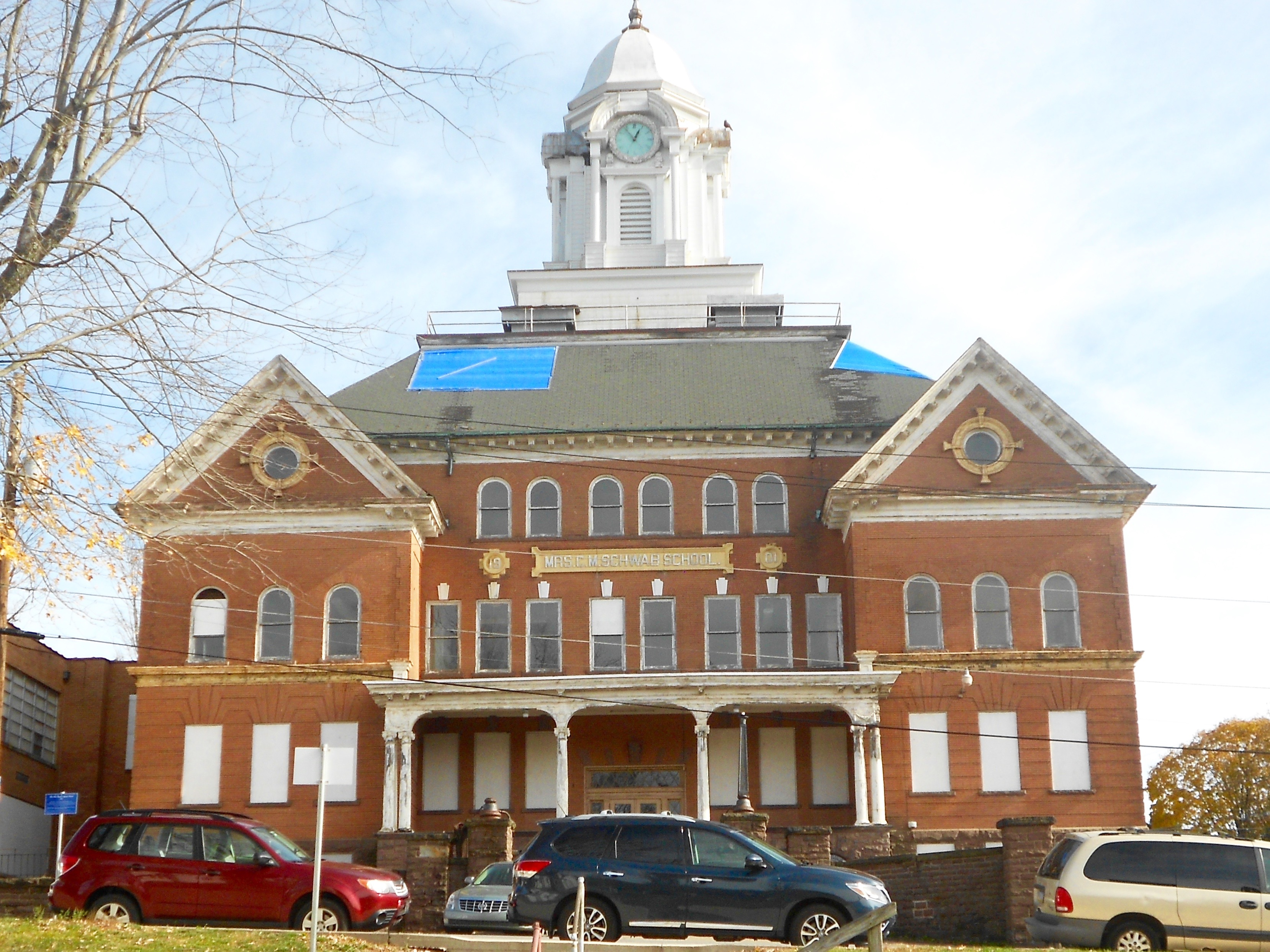
- The former Mrs. C.M. Schwab School, built in 1901

- Seal

- Location of Weatherly in Carbon County, Pennsylvania.

- Location of Weatherly in Pennsylvania Weatherly (the United States)
- Coordinates: 40°56′25″N 75°49′36″W
- Country: United States
- State: Pennsylvania
- County: Carbon

Government
  - Mayor: Michael Bellizia, Jr.

Area
  - Total: 2.98 sq mi (7.72 km^{2})
  - Land: 2.98 sq mi (7.72 km^{2})
  - Water: 0 sq mi (0.00 km^{2})
- Elevation: 1,094 ft (333 m)

Population (2020)
  - Total: 2,541
  - Density: 852.9/sq mi (329.32/km^{2})
- Time zone: UTC-5 (EST)
  - Summer (DST): UTC-4 (EDT)
- ZIP code: 18255
- Area codes: 570 and 272
- FIPS code: 42-81856
- Website: weatherlypa.gov

Weatherly is a borough in Carbon County, Pennsylvania, United States. It is part of Northeastern Pennsylvania.

As of the 2020 census, Weatherly had a population of 2,541.

== History ==
Originally called "Black Creek", the town's name changed to "Weatherly" in 1848. Clock-maker David Weatherly, also an executive of the Beaver Meadow Railroad, made an agreement with the town that he would build them a clock if they would rename the town "Weatherly". They changed the name of the town to Weatherly, however David Weatherly returned to Philadelphia to be treated for cancer and died before he could build the promised clock. Charles and Eurana Schwab funded the clock that was built into the clock tower on top of the town's school, but the town kept the name Weatherly. Early in the twentieth century, there were silk mills, foundries, a candy factory, a fabricating plant, and a cigar factory. In 1900, 2,471 people lived there, and in 1910, the population was 2,501.

== Geography ==
Weatherly is located in northwestern Carbon County at 40°56′25″N 75°49′36″W (40.940257, -75.826722). It is situated at an elevation of 1,100 feet (340 m) above sea level in the Ridge-and-Valley Province of the Appalachian Mountains, between Spring Mountain and Round Head Mountain to the north and Broad Mountain to the south.

According to the U.S. Census Bureau, the borough has a total area of 2.98 square miles (7.72 km^{2}), all of it land.

== Demographics ==
Historical population
Census	Pop.	Note	%±
1870	1,076		—
1880	1,977		83.7%
1890	2,961		49.8%
1900	2,471		−16.5%
1910	2,501		1.2%
1920	2,356		−5.8%
1930	2,531		7.4%
1940	2,754		8.8%
1950	2,622		−4.8%
1960	2,591		−1.2%
1970	2,554		−1.4%
1980	2,891		13.2%
1990	2,640		−8.7%
2000	2,612		−1.1%
2010	2,525		−3.3%
2020	2,541		0.6%
U.S. Decennial Census

As of the census of 2000, there were 2,612 people, 931 households, and 679 families residing in the borough. The population density was 866.8 inhabitants per square mile (334.7/km^{2}). There were 1,033 housing units at an average density of 342.8 per square mile (132.4/km^{2}). The racial makeup of the borough was 97.97% White, 0.27% African American, 0.08% Asian, 0.04% Pacific Islander, 0.23% from other races, and 0.42% from two or more races. Hispanic or Latino of any race were 0.69% of the population.

The most common ancestries in Weatherly are Italian (25.2%), Polish (15.8%), German (12.4%), Irish (10.9%), and Slovak (5.5%)

There were 931 households, out of which 32.9% had children under the age of 18 living with them, 57.9% were married couples living together, 11.5% had a female householder with no husband present, and 27.0% were non-families. 23.8% of all households were made up of individuals, and 13.7% had someone living alone who was 65 years of age or older. The average household size was 2.57 and the average family size was 3.03.

In the borough, the population was spread out, with 23.0% under the age of 18, 5.8% from 18 to 24, 25.2% from 25 to 44, 22.1% from 45 to 64, and 23.9% who were 65 years of age or older. The median age was 42 years. For every 100 females there were 86.8 males. For every 100 females age 18 and over, there were 84.1 males.

The median income for a household in the borough was $38,219, and the median income for a family was $43,047. Males had a median income of $32,679 versus $21,607 for females. The per capita income for the borough was $16,192. About 8.7% of families and 10.8% of the population were below the poverty line, including 21.8% of those under age 18 and 3.9% of those age 65 or over.

== Transportation ==
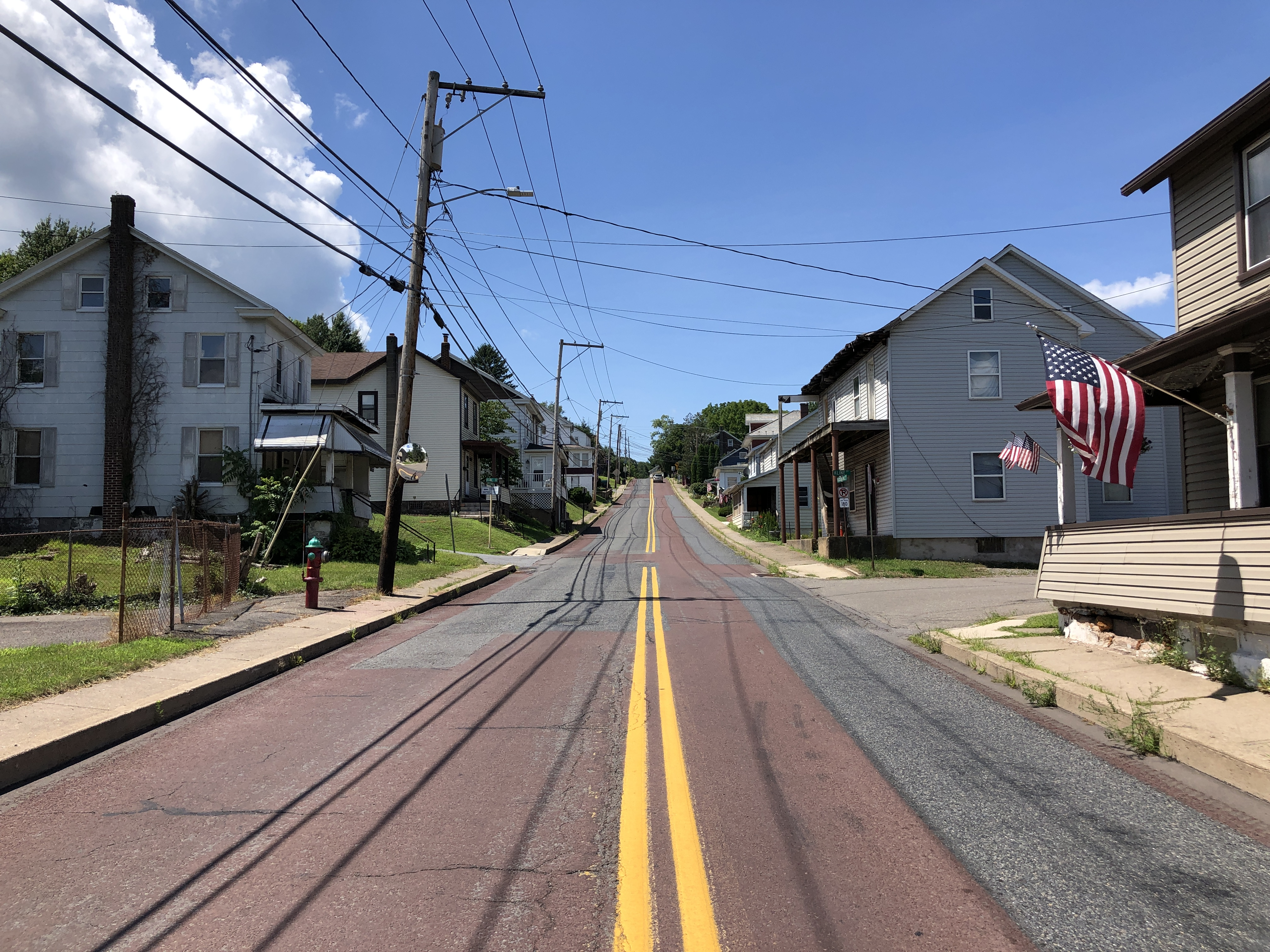
Hudsondale Street in Summit Hill

As of 2007, there were 14.58 miles (23.46 km) of public roads in Weatherly, of which 4.33 miles (6.97 km) were maintained by the Pennsylvania Department of Transportation (PennDOT) and 10.25 miles (16.50 km) were maintained by the borough.

No numbered highways pass through Weatherly. Main thoroughfares in the borough include Hudsondale Street, Main Street, Plane Street and Hill Street. The closest numbered highway is Pennsylvania Route 93.

== Education ==
The Weatherly Area School District serves about 800 students. The elementary and middle schools share one building, while the high school is located just across the street. The Weatherly Area High School has been used since 1991, when, after 90 years, the Mrs. C.M. Schwab school was closed to the public.

== Notable residents ==
- Roland W. Brown, botanist and geologist
- Justin McCarthy, painter
- Emma Schwab, wife of steel magnate Charles M. Schwab
- Elmer Warner, politician
- Thomas Jerome Welsh, bishop of the Roman Catholic Church from 1974 to 1997

== Gallery ==
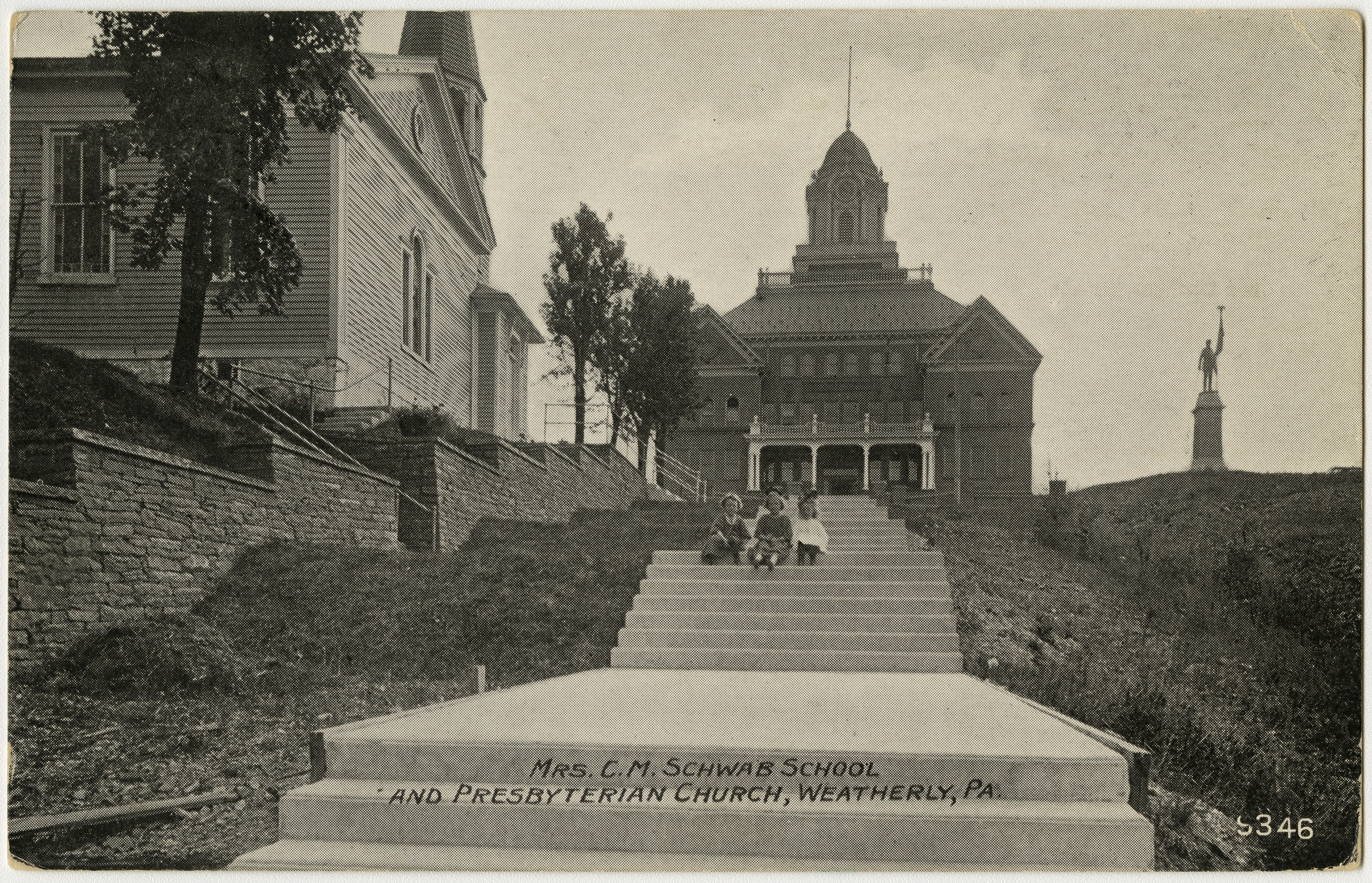
Presbyterian church, Schwab School and Civil War Memorial on an old postcard

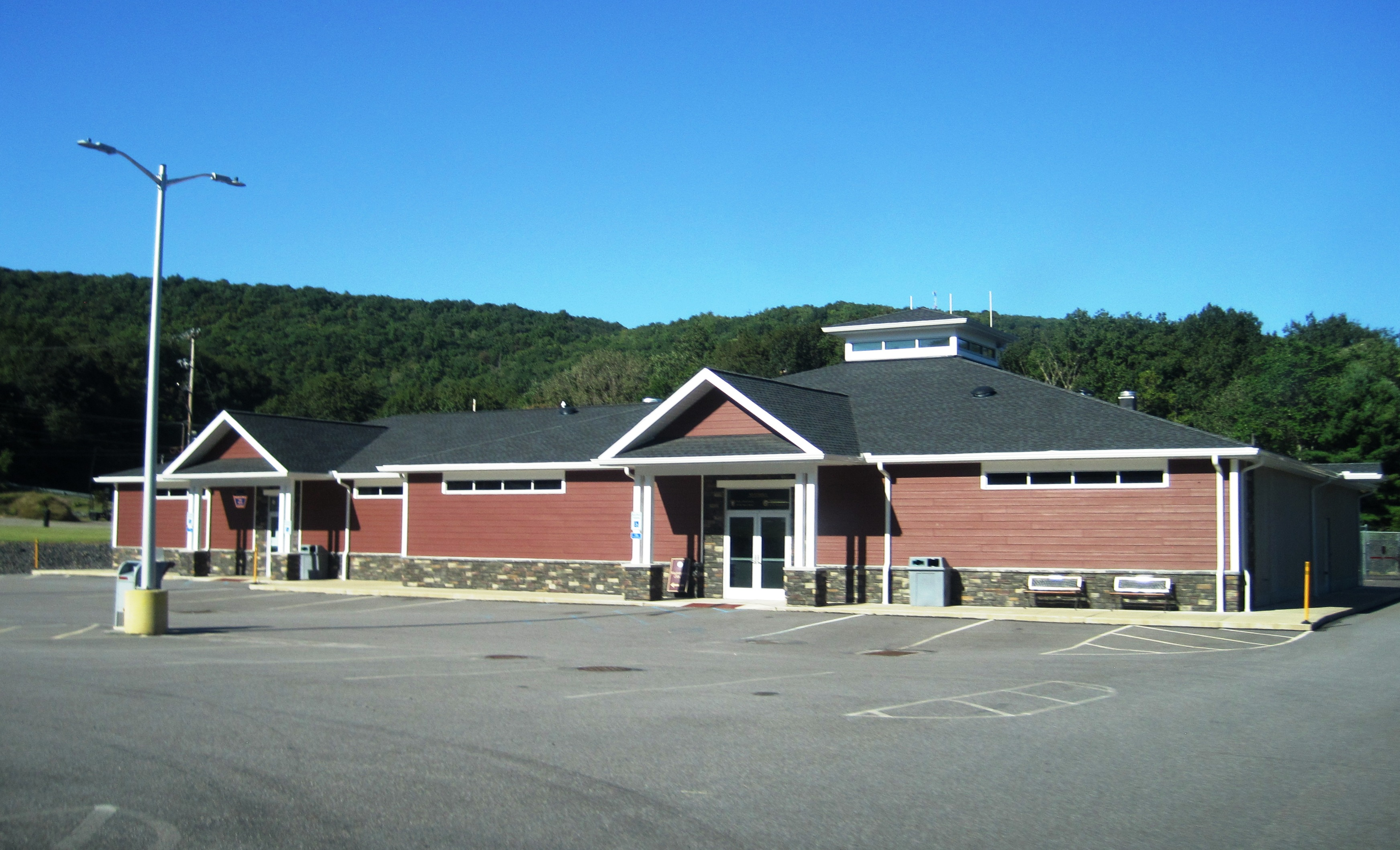
Borough hall

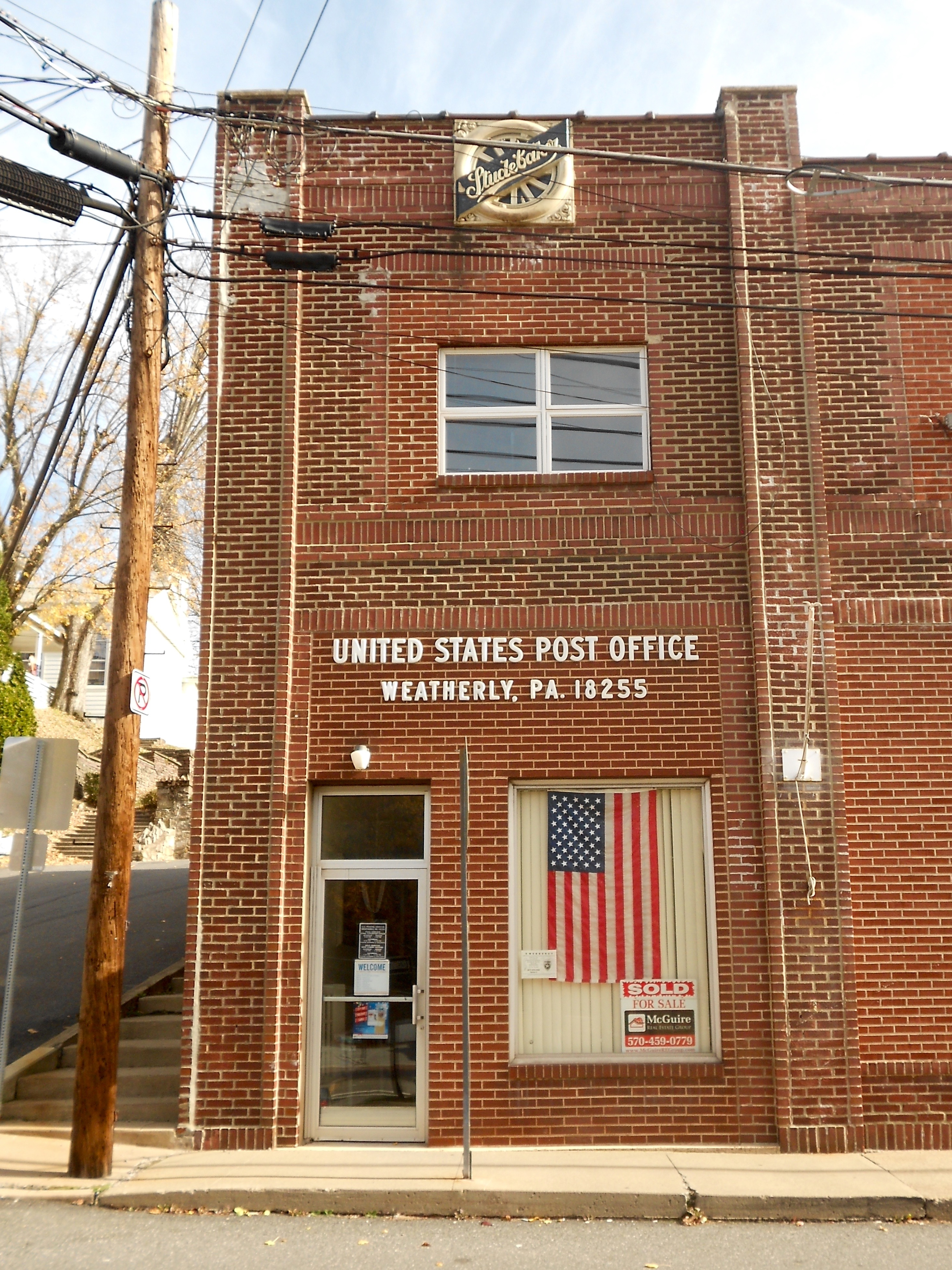
Post Office

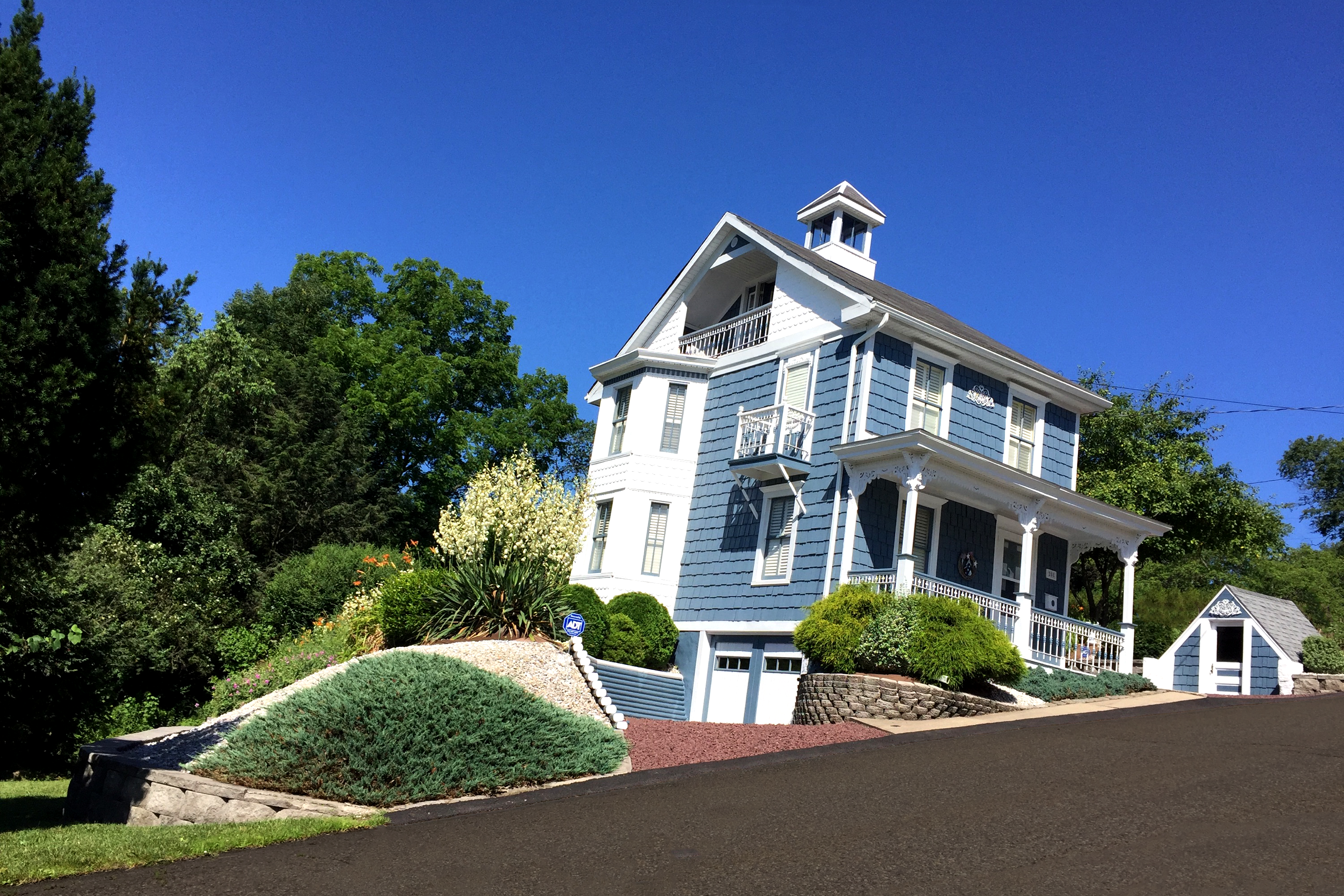
Late 1800s House in Weatherly, PA
