= Justin McCarthy (dancer) =

American-Indian choreographer

- Born: 1957 (age 68–69); East Grand Rapids, Michigan, United States
- Citizenship: United States (former); India
- Occupations: dancer, dance instructor and choreographer
- Years active: 1989-present
- Career
- Dances: Bharatanatyam

Justin McCarthy (born 1957) is an American-born Indian Bharatnatyam dancer, instructor and choreographer. He teaches Bharatnatyam at the Shriram Bharatiya Kala Kendra at Delhi, where he has been for the last three decades. He moved to India in 1979, learnt Bharatanatyam from danseuse Leela Samson for ten years, before beginning to teach it at the Shriram Bharatiya Kala Kendra at Delhi, where he has teaching ever since. Before this, he received his early training at the Dance School of Berkeley and later trained under Subbaraya Pillai, a leading Guru of the Pandanallur style of Bharatanatyam at Chennai. He is also a pianist of Western classical music, and adept in Carnatic music.

== Early life and training ==
Justin McCarthy was born and brought up in East Grand Rapids, Michigan, in a family of Irish descent. He graduated from East Grand Rapids High School in 1974. He learnt piano and received his early dance training at the Berkeley School of Dance. Later he moved to California, where in the mid-'70s after watching a Bharatanatyam performance at the Golden Gate Park, he soon started learning Bharatanatyam from two American dancers, Lesandre Ayrey and Mimi Janislauuski, students of the Balasaraswati, subsequently, he decided to leave for India.

After his move to India, he first trained under Subbaraya Pillai, a leading Guru of the Pandanallur style of Bharatanatyam at Chennai. Next, he trained under Bharatanatyam danseuse Leela Samson for ten years at Shriram Bhartiya Kala Kendra, Delhi. Meanwhile, he also learnt Tamil and Sanskrit languages, apart from learning Carnatic music vocal.

== Career ==
After performing as a soloist, he has been teaching Bharatanatyam at the Shriram Bharatiya Kala Kendra in Delhi for the last two decades. He is also the Director of Performing Arts at Ashoka University.

Apart from a Western classical pianist, he is also a keyboardist, plays harpsichord, a baroque keyboard instrument and teaches piano to young children. He has been living in Delhi for the past 30 years and has acquired Indian citizenship.

Justin entered dance choreography in the early 1990s with a poem from Sangam literature, Madurai Kanchi, still one of his noted works. Having learnt Carnatic music, he also composed music for his choreographic works. His choreographed Kshetrayya, based on the imagined life of a 17th-century poet-musician by the same name, was a "hit", and his 2009 production, Rajavilasam — Splendours of the Courtesans performed by Gati Forum also received rave reviews.

In 2010, his dance repertoire troupe, presented a production Lokaalokam, a fusion of three Indian classical dance forms, Chhau, Kathak and Bharatanatyam at the "Ananya Dance Festival" in Delhi's 16th-century Purana Qila.
