= Ceallach ua Maílcorgus =

Ceallach ua Maílcorgus (died 999) was the ollam (chief poet) of Connacht.

The Annals of the Four Masters record his death under the year 999. No surviving poems by him are known.

Preceded by Senchán Torpéist	Chief Poet of Connacht ?–999	Succeeded by Feardana Ua Carthaigh
