= Joseph McCarthy (disambiguation) =

Joseph McCarthy (1908–1957) was a United States Senator and anti-Communist who is the namesake for McCarthyism.

Joseph or Joe McCarthy may also refer to:

== Sports ==
- Joe McCarthy (catcher) (1881–1937), American baseball catcher
- Joe McCarthy (baseball manager) (1887–1978), American baseball manager
- Joe McCarthy (wrestler) (1929–2012), American professional wrestler
- Joey McCarthy (born 1972), American NASCAR driver
- Joe McCarthy (outfielder) (born 1994), American baseball outfielder
- Joe McCarthy (rugby union) (born 2001), American-born Irish rugby union player

== Military ==
- Joseph J. McCarthy (1911–1996), American Medal of Honor recipient at the Battle of Iwo Jima
- Joseph Aidan MacCarthy (1914–1995), Irish-born medical officer in the Royal Air Force
- Joe McCarthy (RCAF officer) (1919–1998), American-born volunteer pilot in the Royal Canadian Air Force who flew in Operation Chastise

== Others ==
- Joseph Edward McCarthy (1876–1955), American Roman Catholic Bishop of Portland, 1932–1955
- Joseph W. McCarthy (1884–1965), American architect
- Joseph McCarthy (lyricist) (1885–1943), American song lyricist and director of ASCAP
- Joe McCarthy (Irish musician) (born 1936), Irish musician with the showband group The Dixies
- Joseph G. McCarthy (born 1938), American plastic surgeon
