= Liam Murphy (Gaelic footballer) =

Irish Gaelic footballer

Personal information
- Born: Gneeveguilla, County Kerry
- Height: 5 ft 9 in (175 cm)

Sport
- Sport: Gaelic football
- Position: Forward
Club
- Years: Club
- 1990s-2010s: Gneeveguilla
Club titles
- Kerry titles: 3
Inter-county
- Years: County
- 2000: Kerry
Inter-county titles
- Munster titles: 0
- All-Irelands: 0
- NFL: 0
- All Stars: 0

Liam Murphy (born in Gneeveguilla, County Kerry, Ireland) is Gaelic footballer. He played with Kerry at different levels in the 1990s and 2000s.

== Club ==
He had some successes at club level in both Kerry and Cork. In Kerry with his local Gneeveguilla club and with the Kerry team and in Cork with UCC.

He was part of the East Kerry team that won 3 Kerry Senior Football Championship titles in a row from 1997 to 1999. He also won a Minor County Championship in 1996 and an Under 21 Championship in 1999 with the division.

With Gneeveguilla, he won a County Junior Championship in 2000. In 2003 Gneeveguilla won their first East Kerry Senior Football Championship title in 20 years with Murphy involved in that win. In 2010, after losing the 2009 final, Gneeveguilla won the County Intermediate Championship and later went on to win the Munster Intermediate Club Football Championship.

He also won the 1999 Cork Senior Football Championship title with UCC, and later a Munster Senior Club Football Championship

== Schools ==
Murphy had much success at Vocational Schools level with Rathmore Post Primary School and the Kerry county team. With Rathmore Post Primary he won an All-Ireland Vocational Schools Championship with the school in 1995 and was a Runner-Up in 1996.

With the county team he was part of the Kerry Vocational Schools team that made it to the 1996 All-Ireland Vocational Schools Championship final but lost out this time to Donegal. He was again part of the team in 1997, this time he helped his side to victory over Tyrone.

== Career ==
Minor

He first came on the intercounty scene in 1995 as part of the Kerry minor but had little success as Kerry lost out to Cork. He was again part of the team that won the Munster title in 1996, Kerry later qualified for the All-Ireland final. But despite three points from Murphy his lost out to Laois. In all he played seven games at minor level over two seasons scoring 1-25 (28 points)

Under 21

Murphy later joined the county's Under 21 team in 1999 in a season. He was full forward in all of Kerry's game including the Munster final win over Cork. Kerry later qualified for the All-Ireland final but were beaten by Westmeath. In his five games at Under 21 level he scored 1-06 (9 points)

Junior

He then moved on to the Kerry Junior team in 1999 lining out in a surprise loss to Clare He was again part of the team in 2000 and won a Munster Championship after a win over Clare in the final. Kery made it to the final but once again Murphy lost out at the All Ireland stage this time to Roscommon. He played four games at Junior level but failed to score.

Senior

Despite playing a leading role at underage and Junior level he only made a handful of National League appearances with the Kerry senior team in 2000.
