= Howard W. Smith =

American politician (1883–1976)

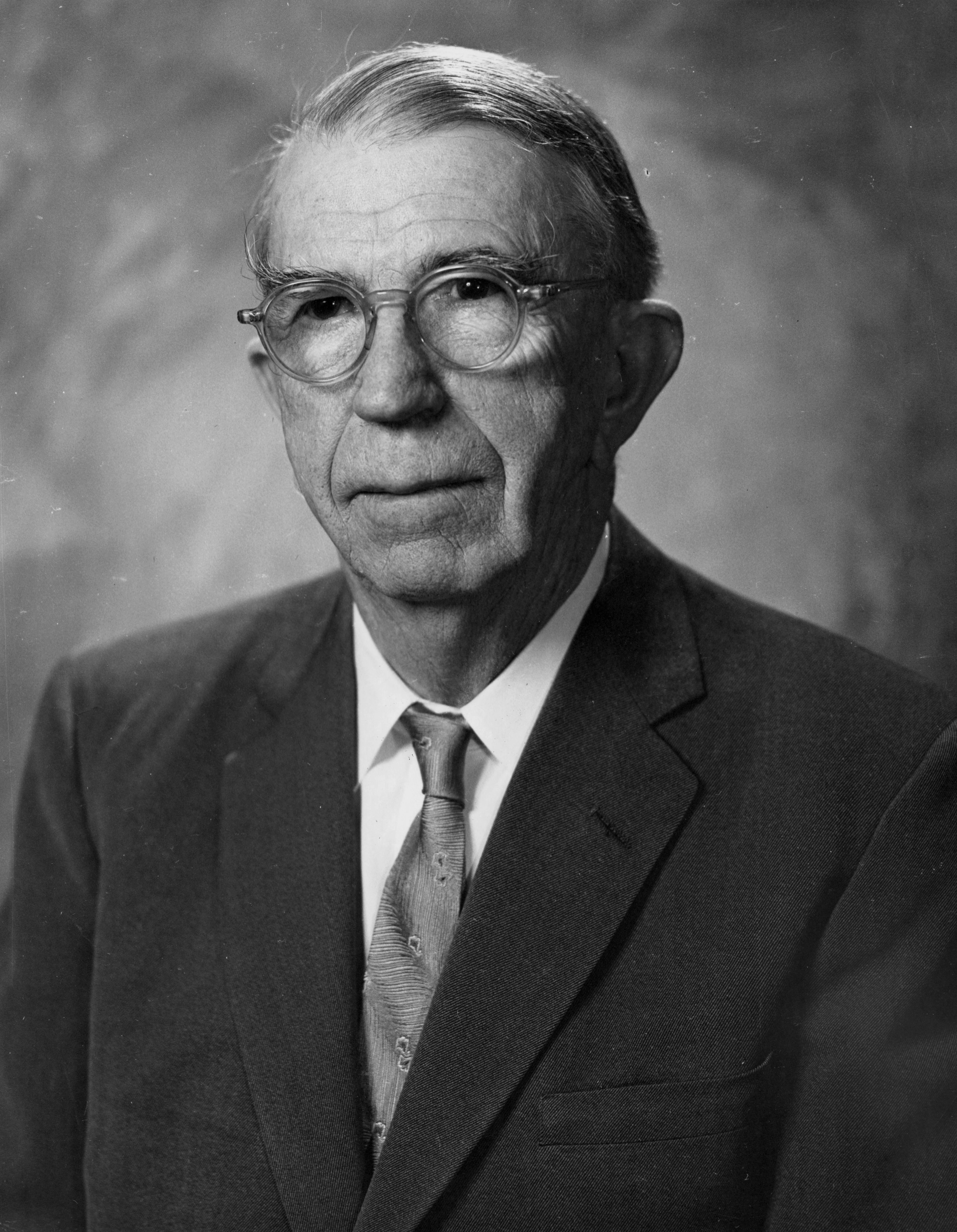
- Portrait of Smith, c. 1960

Chair of the House Rules Committee
- In office January 3, 1955 – January 3, 1967
- Speaker: Sam Rayburn; John W. McCormack
- Preceded by: Leo E. Allen
- Succeeded by: William M. Colmer

Member of the U.S. House of Representatives from Virginia
- In office March 4, 1931 – January 3, 1967
- Preceded by: R. Walton Moore
- Succeeded by: William L. Scott
- Constituency: 8th district (1931‍–‍1933); At-large (1933‍–‍1935); 8th district (1935‍–‍1967)

Judge of the Virginia Circuit Court for the 16th Judicial Circuit
- In office July 1928 – April 19, 1930
- Preceded by: Samuel G. Brent
- Succeeded by: Walter T. McCarthy

Judge of the Alexandria Corporation Court
- In office October 26, 1922 – July 1928
- Preceded by: Robinson Moncure
- Succeeded by: William P. Woolls

Commonwealth's Attorney for Alexandria
- In office September 1, 1918 – October 26, 1922
- Preceded by: Samuel G. Brent
- Succeeded by: William P. Woolls

Personal details
- Born: Howard Worth Smith; February 2, 1883 Broad Run, Virginia, U.S.
- Died: October 3, 1976 (aged 93) Alexandria, Virginia, U.S.
- Resting place: Little Georgetown Cemetery; Broad Run, Virginia, U.S.
- Party: Democratic
- Spouses: Lillian Proctor (m. 1913; died 1919); Ann Corcoran (m. 1923)
- Children: 2
- Education: University of Virginia (LLB)
- Occupation: Lawyer; judge; politician; banker; farmer

Howard Worth "Judge" Smith (February 2, 1883 – October 3, 1976) was an American politician. A Democratic U.S. Representative from Virginia, he was a leader of the informal but powerful conservative coalition.

Smith offered an amendment to insert "sex" after the word "religion" as a protected class of Title VII of the Civil Rights Act of 1964. The Congressional Record shows Smith made serious arguments, voicing concerns that white women would suffer greater discrimination without a protection for gender. Reformers, who knew Smith was hostile to civil rights for blacks, assumed that he was doing so to defeat the whole bill.

The prohibition of sex discrimination was added on the floor by Smith. While Smith strongly opposed civil rights laws for blacks, he supported such laws for women. Smith's amendment passed by a vote of 168 to 133.

== Early life and education ==
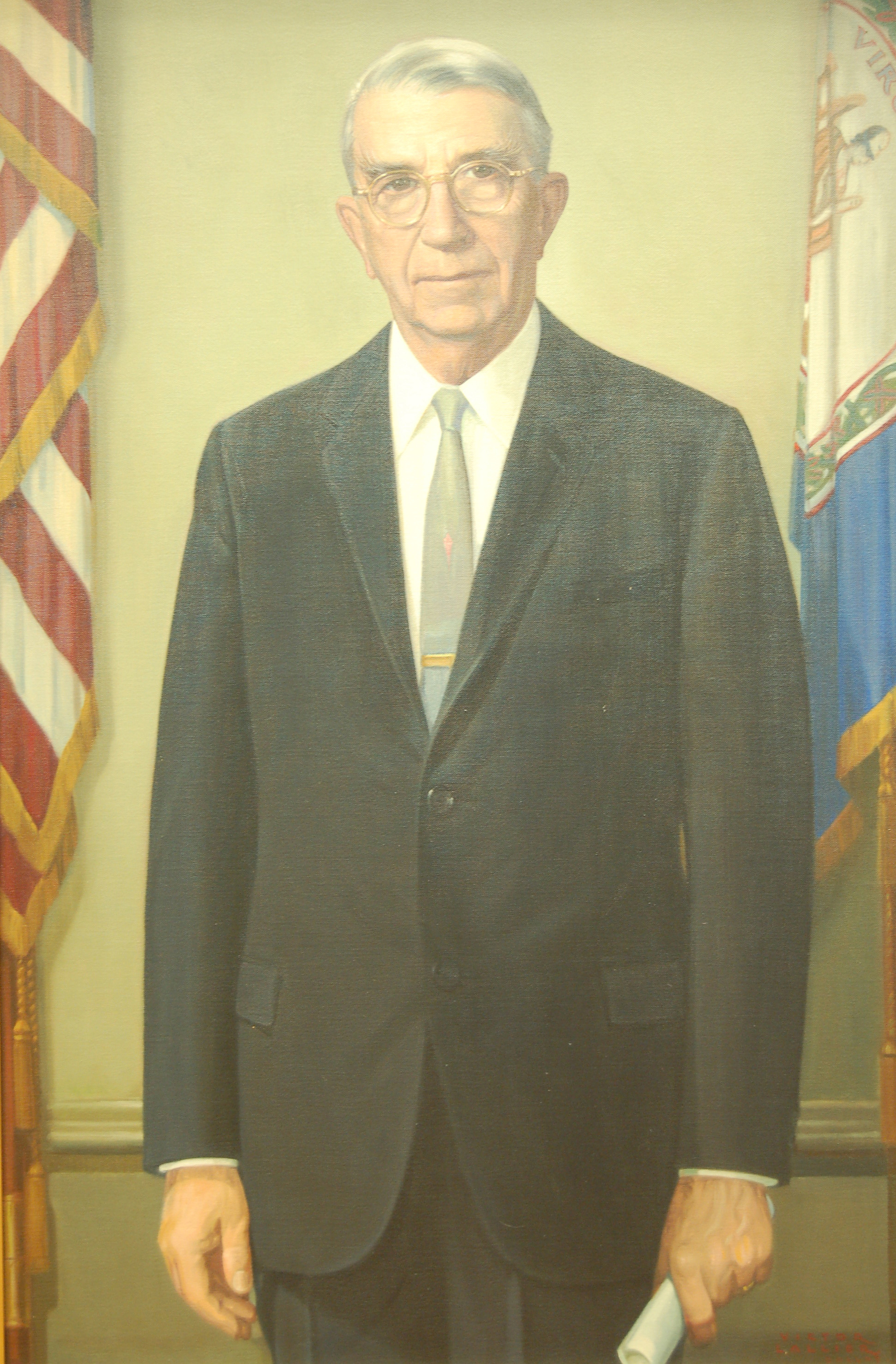
Smith's congressional portrait

Howard Worth Smith was born in Broad Run, Virginia, on February 2, 1883. He attended public schools and graduated from Bethel Military Academy in Warrenton, Virginia during 1901. He took his LLB at the law department of the University of Virginia at Charlottesville in 1903. Smith was admitted to the bar in 1904 and practiced in Alexandria, Virginia.

During World War I, Smith was assistant general counsel to the Federal Alien Property Custodian. From 1918 to 1922 he was Commonwealth's Attorney for Alexandria. He served as judge of Alexandria's corporation court from 1922 to 1928. From 1928 to 1930, Smith served as judge of Virginia's sixteenth judicial circuit. Smith was often referred to as "Judge Smith" even while in Congress, and his additional ventures included banking, farming, and dairying.

== Representative ==
He was elected in 1930 to the U.S. House of Representatives. He initially supported New Deal measures such as the Tennessee Valley Authority Act and the National Industrial Recovery Act. A leader of the conservative coalition who opposed the New Deal, he led the opposition to the National Labor Relations Board (NLRB), serving as head of a special House committee dominated by members of the coalition. The committee conducted a sensationalist investigation that undermined public support for the NLRB and, more broadly, for the New Deal. In June 1940, amendments proposed by the Smith Committee passed by a large margin in the House, partly because of Smith's new alliance with William Green, president of the American Federation of Labor. The AFL was convinced the NLRB was controlled by leftists who supported the rival Congress of Industrial Organizations in organizing drives. New Dealers stopped the Smith amendments, but Roosevelt replaced the CIO-oriented members on the NLRB with men acceptable to Smith and the AFL.

Smith proposed the Alien Registration Act of 1940, an anticommunist law, which became known as the Smith Act. It required resident aliens to register. It also banned advocating the overthrow of the U.S. government or its political subdivisions. American Communist Party chairman Gus Hall was one of many communists later convicted of violating its provisions. The U.S. Supreme Court ruled in Yates v. United States (1957) that the First Amendment protected much radical speech, which halted prosecutions under the Smith Act.

=== Opposition to civil rights ===
As chairman of the United States House Committee on Rules starting in 1954, Smith controlled the flow of legislation in the House. An opponent of racial integration, Smith used his power as chairman of the Rules Committee to keep much civil rights legislation from coming to a vote on the House floor.

He was a signatory to the 1956 Southern Manifesto that opposed the desegregation of public schools ordered by the Supreme Court in Brown v. Board of Education (1954). A friend described him as someone who "had a real feeling of kindness toward the black people he knew, but he did not respect the race."

When the Civil Rights Act of 1957 came before Smith's committee, Smith said, "The Southern people have never accepted the colored race as a race of people who had equal intelligence and education and social attainments as the whole people of the South." Others noted him as an apologist for slavery who used the Ancient Greeks and Romans in its defense.

Speaker Sam Rayburn tried to reduce his power in 1961, with only limited success.

Smith delayed passage of the Civil Rights Act of 1964. One of Rayburn's reforms was the "Twenty-One Day Rule" that required a bill to be sent to the floor within 21 days. Under pressure, Smith released the bill.

Two days before the vote, Smith offered an amendment to insert "sex" after the word "religion" as a protected class of Title VII of the Civil Rights Act of 1964. The Congressional Record shows Smith made serious arguments, voicing concerns that white women would suffer greater discrimination without a protection for gender. Reformers, who knew Smith was hostile to civil rights for blacks, assumed that he was doing so to defeat the whole bill. In 1968, Leo Kanowitz wrote that, within the context of the anti-civil rights coalition making "every effort to block" the passage of Title VII, "it is abundantly clear that a principal motive in introducing ["sex"] was to prevent passage of the basic legislation being considered by Congress, rather than solicitude for women's employment rights." Kanowitz notes that Representative Edith Green, who was one of the few female legislators in the House at that time, held that view that legislation against sex discrimination in employment "would not have received one hundred votes," indicating that it would have been defeated handedly.

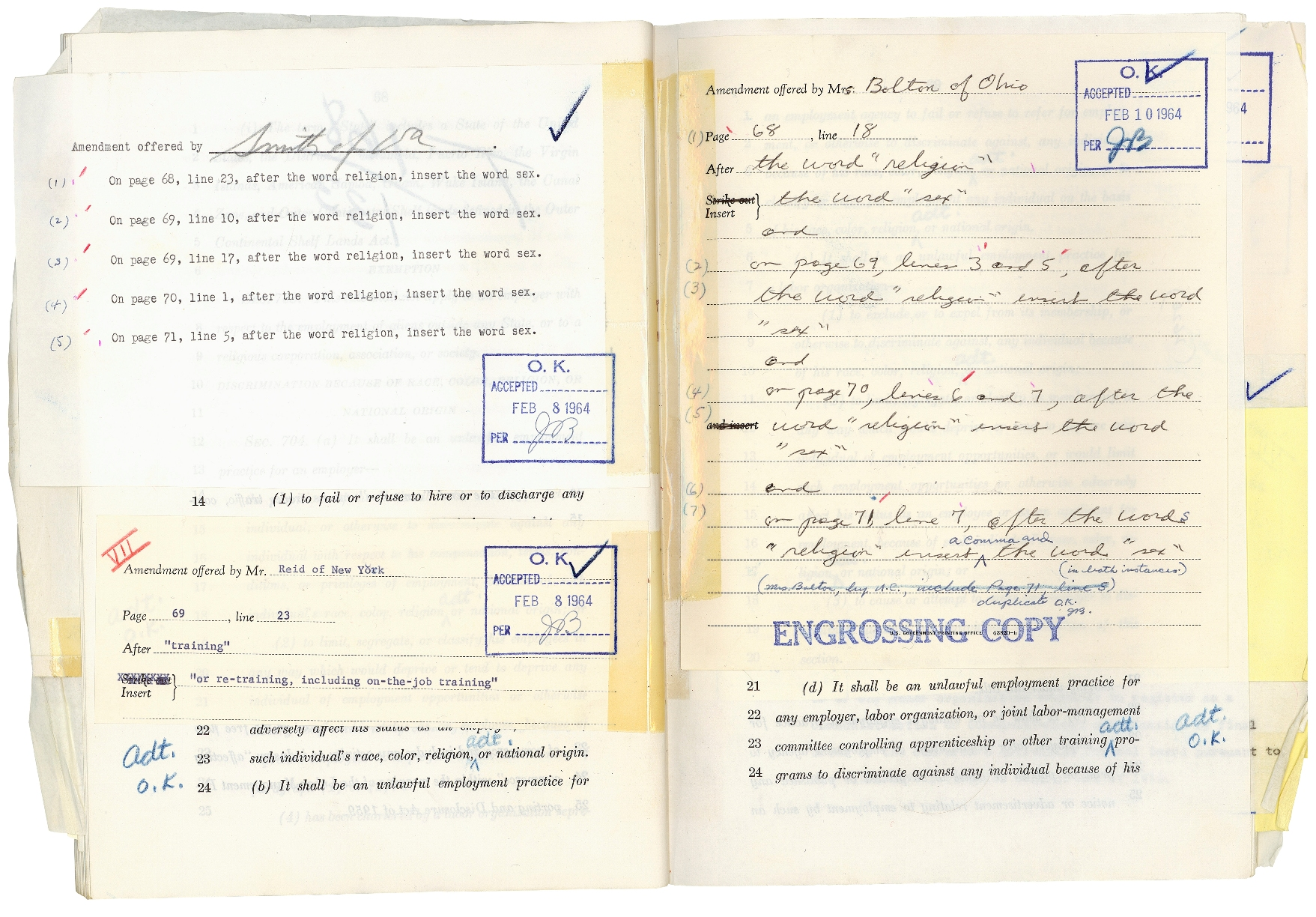
House Rules Committee clerk's record of markup session adding "sex" to bill.

In 1964, the burning national issue was civil rights for blacks. Activists argued that it was "the Negro's hour" and that adding women's rights to the bill could hurt its chance of being passed. However, opponents voted for the Smith amendment. The National Woman's Party (NWP) had used Smith to include sex as a protected category and so achieved their main goal.

The prohibition of sex discrimination was added on the floor by Smith. While Smith strongly opposed civil rights laws for blacks, he supported such laws for women. Smith's amendment passed by a vote of 168 to 133.

Smith expected that Republicans, who had included equal rights for women in their party's platform since 1940, would probably vote for the amendment. Some historians speculate that Smith, in addition to helping women, was trying to embarrass northern Democrats, who opposed civil rights for women since labor unions opposed the clause.

Smith insisted that he sincerely supported the amendment and along with Representative Martha Griffiths was the chief spokesperson for the amendment. For 20 years, Smith had sponsored the Equal Rights Amendment, with no linkage to racial issues, in the House. He for decades had been close to the NWP and its leader, Alice Paul, one of the leaders in winning the vote for women in 1920 and the chief supporter of equal rights proposals since then. She and other feminists had worked with Smith since 1945 to try to find a way to include sex as a protected civil rights category.

Griffiths argued that the new law would protect black women but not white women and so was unfair to white women. Furthermore, she argued that the laws "protecting" women from unpleasant jobs were actually designed to enable men to monopolize those jobs, which was unfair to women who were not allowed to try the jobs. The amendment passed with the votes of Republicans and Southern Democrats. Republicans and Northern Democrats voted for the bill's final passage.

When Bostock v. Clayton County was decided in 2020, legal scholars postulated that Smith's insertion of "sex" into Title VII of Civil Rights Act of 1964 protected sexual orientation and gender identity from employment discrimination.

Smith had a part in temporarily blocking the Economic Opportunity Act of 1964 because "Job Corps provision would allow coeducational and interracial job camps."

=== Defeat ===
After U.S. Senator Carter Glass died in 1946, Smith sought the nomination to succeed him. The Byrd Organization, of which Smith was a member, instead nominated A. Willis Robertson, who was elected to the Senate.

Smith was defeated in the 1966 primary by a considerably more liberal Democrat, State Delegate George Rawlings. Although Smith remained neutral in the general election, many of his supporters defected to Republican William L. Scott, who soundly defeated Rawlings in November.

== Later life ==
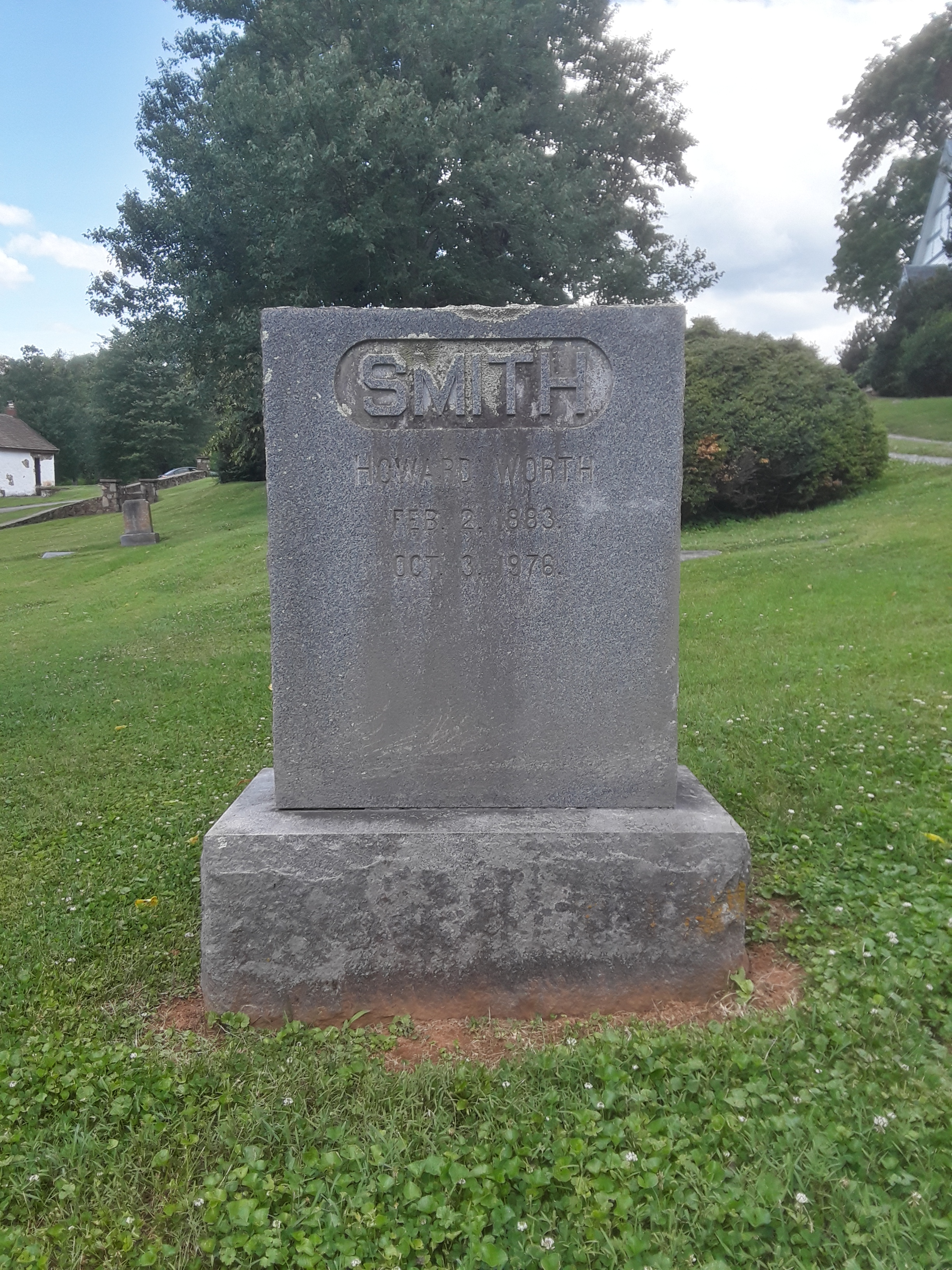
Smith's grave in Little Georgetown Cemetery

Smith resumed the practice of law in Alexandria, where he died at 93 on October 3, 1976. He was interred in Little Georgetown Cemetery, Broad Run, Virginia.

== Portrait controversy ==
In January 1995, the House Rules Committee chairman, Republican Congressman Gerald B. H. Solomon, had a portrait of Smith by Victor Lallier hung in the Committee hearing room. The Congressional Black Caucus requested that it be removed. Georgia Congressman John Lewis said:

It is an affront to all of us ...[Smith is] perhaps best remembered for his obstruction in passing this country's civil rights laws. A man who in his own words never accepted the colored race as a race of people who had equal intelligence and education and social attainments as the White people of the South...

Solomon said he displayed the portrait to acknowledge Smith's co-operative work with Republicans when he was chairman but that he was unaware of his segregationist views. The portrait was later removed.

== Portrayals ==
Smith was portrayed by American actor Ken Jenkins in the 2016 HBO TV movie All the Way, in which his segregationist views posed as a central and divisive opposition to President Lyndon B. Johnson's proposal of the Civil Rights Act of 1964.

U.S. House of Representatives
Preceded by R. Walton Moore	Member of the U.S. House of Representatives from Virginia's 8th congressional district 1931–1933	Succeeded by District abolished Himself after district re-established in 1935
Preceded by District re-established John S. Wise before district eliminated in 1885	Member of the U.S. House of Representatives from Virginia's at-large congressional seat 1933 – 1935	Succeeded by District abolished
Preceded by District re-established Himself before district abolished in 1933	Member of the U.S. House of Representatives from Virginia's 8th congressional district 1935–1967	Succeeded by William L. Scott
Political offices
Preceded by Leo E. Allen	Chairman of the United States House Committee on Rules; 1955–1966	Succeeded by William M. Colmer
