= Muireadhach Ua Cárthaigh =

Irish poet, 11th century

Muireadhach Ua Cárthaigh (died 1067) was Chief Poet of Connacht.

== Overview ==
Muireadhach Ua Cárthaigh, was in 1067 "drowned in Loch Calgaich." He was described as "the chief poet and chief ollamh of Connaught." No surviving poems are known.

The Uí Cárthaigh (anglicised Carthy) family were located in Ui Maine, though apparently not members of the dynasty.

== See also ==
- Ó Cárthaigh

Preceded by Ceallach ua Maílcorgus	Chief Poet of Connacht ?–1067	Succeeded by In Druí Ua Cárthaigh
