= Carty =

Carty or Carthy is a surname likely to have originated from the Irish name Ó Cárthaigh (Irish: [oː ˈkaɾˠhəj]; anglicised as O'Coraic). It took its current form Carty during later historical events when many Gaelic Irish names were anglicised. It has been speculated that some Irish immigrants to America and/or their descendants added Mc, changing their names to McCarty in the incorrect belief that they were returning the name back to its original form.

The Carty name originates from the south of the island of Ireland (County Wexford) and could have been a subclan of the much larger McCarthy clan, and a member of the Clan Eoghanachta. It has been recorded that the Carty clan was a scattered sept or clan in pre Norman Ireland which may have resulted from an event such as having come off the wrong end of a tribal dispute. Carty settlements can be found across Ireland sometimes in locations that were easy to defend such as Coney Island, County Sligo which hosts the remains of a small Carty settlement (town and beach). Carty is a common name today in the Irish counties of Wexford, Sligo, Cork, Galway and Roscommon. It is common in County Longford under the spelling of Carthy until the last thirty years.

Nicholas Le Poer Trench, 9th Earl of Clancarty, 8th Marquess of Heusden (born 1952) is an Irish peer, as well a nobleman in the Dutch nobility. He served as an elected Crossbench member of the British House of Lords.

== Cartys outside Ireland ==
In Montserrat, Carty is a common name, due to the Irish settlers and indentured servants on the Island, and some of the African slaves were given the name, which was a common occurrence at the time. The same is true in Anguilla, where there are still European descendants on the island as well as those of African descent.

In 1873, Paul Carty emigrated with his family from Sligo, Ireland to Canada in order to take up the position of Chief Inspector of the Royal Newfoundland Constabulary. Cartyville is named after his son Michael H. Carty who went on to become a famous Newfoundland lawyer and politician.

== Cartys in County Down in Elizabethan times ==
According to an Elizabethan map of the 1500s, Carty was an important name in the Ards peninsula in Down in the 1500s. Little more is known of this sept at the time.

== Surname ==
- In Druí Ua Carthaigh (died 1097), Chief Poet of Connacht
- Arthur Carty (born 1940), Canadian scientist
- Denzil Angus Carty (1904–1975), American Episcopal priest
- Donald J. Carty (born 1946), chairman of Porter Airlines
- E. Bower Carty (1916–2001) former chairman of the World Scout Committee
- Elizabeth Carty, Miss North Carolina Teen USA 2004
- Frank Carty (1897–1942), Irish Republican Army leader
- Germán Carty (born 1968), Peruvian former football player
- Jay Carty (1941–2017), American former basketball player
- John Carty (Irish politician) (1950–2014), Irish politician
- John Carty (musician), Irish musician
- John J. Carty (1861–1932), American electrical engineer
- Johndale Carty (born 1977), American former football defensive back
- Kacey Carty (born 1997), Caribbean cricketer
- Michael Carty (1916–1975) Irish politician
- Michael H. Carty (1860–1900), Canadian lawyer and politician.
- Mother Praxedes Carty (1854–1933), Irish American educator and religious sister
- Paddy Carty (1929–1980), Irish flute player
- Rico Carty (1939–2024), Dominican former baseball player
- Todd Carty (born 1963), Irish actor and director

== See also ==
- Carry (name)
