= Richard McCarty =

Richard McCarty may refer to:

- Richard C. McCarty (born 1947), American psychologist and academic
- Richard E. McCarty, American biologist
- Richard McCarty (politician) (1780–1844), United States Representative from New York

== See also ==
- Rick McCarty, American college baseball coach
