= Joe McCarthy (Irish musician) =

Irish musician

Joe McCarthy (born Joseph Terence McCarthy, 6 August 1936, Cork, Ireland) is an Irish musician, who was for many years one of the best known faces of the showband group The Dixies.

He was born into a well-known local family of stonemasons and lived in Copleys Street in Cork city centre. McCarthy's uncle "Buddy" was a well-known dance promoter and had at one time a dancehall on nearby Union Quay. As a youth Joe joined the Cork Butter Exchange Brass Band and learned to play the French Horn but later became best known as a drummer. He was also regarded, by many, as the funniest man in Ireland for over fifty years.

In 1954 Joe and two of his friends, Sean Lucey and Theo Cahill formed a dance band which they called The Dixielanders. This was later to be shortened to The Dixies and in the 1960s became one of the best known showbands in Ireland.

During the 1960s a number of other musicians joined the band and some left but the most significant was the arrival of vocalist Brendan O'Brien in the late 1960s. In 1968 the band had their greatest success when their version of Leapy Lees "Little Arrows" shot to No.1 in the Irish singles chart.

During the late 1970s the band broke up after lead singer Brendan O'Brien was electrocuted on stage and seriously injured due to a faulty microphone.

McCarthy went solo and did relatively successful but tragedy struck in 1981 when his eldest son Aidan, and Aidan's wife Linda were killed in a car accident. Four months later Joe's mother died and he went out of the music business for over a year.

However he returned and was instrumental in bringing the Dixies back together with a new line up in December 1982. He stayed with the band until 1990 before again embarking on a solo career. To this day he continues to play on an almost nightly basis at venues around Cork city and county.
