= J. Michael McCarthy =

American mechanical engineer

- Born: John Michael McCarthy; 1952 (age 73–74)

Academic background
- Education: Loyola Marymount University (BS); Stanford University (MS, PhD)

Academic work
- Institutions: University of California, Irvine
- Main interests: Kinematics; Robotics; Computer-aided design; Mechanical linkages

John Michael McCarthy (born c. 1952) is an American mechanical engineer known for his work in robotics, kinematics, and linkages. He is a Distinguished Professor of Mechanical and Aerospace Engineering at the University of California, Irvine (UCI), where he has taught since 1986.

== Biography ==
McCarthy attended Loyola Marymount University in Los Angeles, earning a bachelor's degree in mechanical engineering in 1974. He later attended Stanford University, where he earned a master's degree in 1975 and a doctorate in mechanical engineering in 1979.

He joined the faculty of the UC Irvine Samueli School of Engineering in 1986. He was appointed Henry Samueli Chair and director of the Center for Engineering Science in Design from 2006 to 2014. He was also director of the UCI Performance Engineering Program from 2010 to 2020.

McCarthy's research has focused on robotic systems, mechanical linkages, and geometric modeling. His research team maintains the Synthetica, Sphinx, and MecGen software packages used in the computer-aided design of spherical and spatial linkage systems.

He was chief technology officer (CTO) of Accuray in 2001, where he helped develop and deploy robotic surgery devices using radio wave control. Since 2005, McCarthy has headed his eponymous consulting firm McCarthy Design Associates, specializing in intellectual property and patents for machine design.

McCarthy is a fellow of the American Society of Mechanical Engineers (ASME) and Society for Industrial and Applied Mathematics. He was a chief editor for the ASME Journal of Mechanical Design from 2002 to 2007 and the founding editor for the Journal of Mechanisms and Robotics from 2007 to 2014. He was secretary for the Orange County Engineering Council in 2012. He was also a visiting professor at the Stanford University School of Engineering where he taught Kinematic Synthesis of Mechanisms in 2018.

== Racing ==
McCarthy has participated, advised, and refereed Formula racing for three decades. He competed in the Xtreme Gravity Racing (XGR) Competition in 2006 and 2007 and won Most Innovative Design for a novel virtual kingpin steering linkage. He was chair of the governing board of SAE International's Southern California section from 2009 to 2011. He has been a project advisor for UCI Anteater Racing, a college Formula SAE competition team, since 2003.

== Awards ==
- Outstanding Service Award, ASME (2008)
- Fariborz Maseeh Best Teaching Award (2009)
- Machine Design Award, ASME (2009)
- UCI Teaching Excellence in Undergraduate Engineering Award (2010)
- Mechanisms and Robotics Award (2011)
- Robert E. Abbott Lifetime Service Award (2013)

== Books ==
- Geometric Design of Linkages, Springer (2000); 2nd Ed. 2010; ISBN 978-1441978912
- 21st Century Kinematics, Springer (2012); ISBN 978-1447145097
- Introduction to Theoretical Kinematics: The Mathematics of Movement, MDA Press (2018); ISBN 978-0978518035
- Kinematic Synthesis of Mechanisms, MDA Press (2019); ISBN 978-0978518059
- Design of Mechanical Walking Robots, MDA Press (2021); ISBN 978-0978518066
