= Nicholas McCarthy =

Nicholas McCarthy or Nick McCarthy may refer to:

- Nick McCarthy (born 1974), English musician based in Germany
- Nicholas McCarthy (director) (born 1970), film director and writer
- Nicholas McCarthy (pianist), British pianist
- Nick McCarthy (rugby union), an Irish rugby union player who plays for the States
