= Mícheál Ó hAodha =

Irish poet and nonfiction writer (born 1969)

- Born: 1969 (age 56–57)
- Occupation: Poet

Academic work
- Institutions: University of Limerick

Mícheál Ó hAodha (born 1969) is an Irish poet and nonfiction writer. He also works in the departments of history and comparative literature at the University of Limerick, where he is a part-time lecturer.

== Works ==
Ó hAodha's poems have been collected in the books

- Dúchas Dóchasach ["Survivor": Representations of the New Irish] (as Michael Hayes, illustrated by Jean Hakizimana, Cambridge Scholars Publishing 2007)
- Slán le hÉireann [A Farewell to Ireland: Migrant Poems] (Coiscéim, 2012)
- Leabhar Dubh an tSneachta [The Black Book of Snow] (2015)
- Leabhar na nAistear [The Book of Journeys] (Coiscéim, 2017)
- Leabhar na nAistear II (Coiscéim, 2019)

He is also the author of:

- Canting with Cauley: a Glossary of Travellers' Cant/Gammon (with William Cauley, A. & A. Farmar, 2006)
- Parley with me: a Compendium of Fairground Speech (A. & A. Farmar, 2006)
- Irish Travellers: Representations and Realities (as Michael Hayes, Liffey Press, 2007)
- Postcolonial Artist: Johnny Doran and Irish Traveller Tradition (with David Duohy, Cambridge Scholars Publishing, 2008)
- "Insubordinate Irish": Travellers in the Text (Manchester University Press, 2011)

He has a particular interest in minority groups including Irish Travellers and the Irish-speaking minority of the west of Ireland and has written many books in collaboration with Travellers, Roma, fairground/circus people and others. He has also written on the experiences of Irish emigrants, and the Irish experience in Britain.
