= Deluxe Corporation =

American financial services company

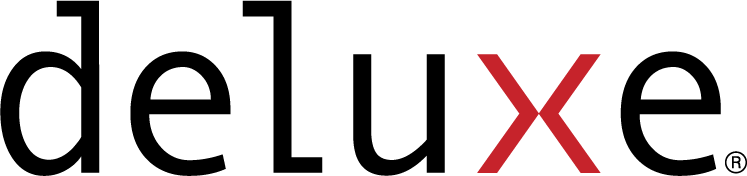
- Type: Public
- Traded as: NYSE: DLX; S&P 600 component
- Industry: Financial services
- Founded: 1915; 111 years ago, in Saint Paul, Minnesota
- Headquarters: 801 South Marquette Avenue; Minneapolis, Minnesota, United States 55402
- Number of locations: 39 locations - corporate offices, distribution and fulfillment centers (2024)
- Key people: Barry C. McCarthy (President and CEO) Chip Zint (CFO) Paul R. Garcia (Chairman of Board of Directors)
- Revenue: ▼US$ 2.12 billion (2024)
- Operating income: ▲US$ 192.17 million (2024)
- Net income: ▲US$ 53 million (2024)
- Total assets: ▼US$ 2.83 billion (2024)
- Total equity: ▼US$ 621 million (2024)
- Number of employees: 4,981 (2024)
- Divisions: Print; B2B Payments; Data Solutions; Merchant Services
- Website: www.deluxe.com

Deluxe Corporation is an American financial services company that provides payment processing, data services, checks and promotional products, and merchant services. It operates in four divisions: B2B payments, data, print, and merchant services. As of 2025, the company serves millions of small businesses and thousands of financial institutions, processing more than $2.8 trillion in payments annually. According to its May 6, 2026 earnings call, 51% of the company's revenue is generated by its payments and data divisions.

Founded in 1915 in Saint Paul, Minnesota, Deluxe relocated its headquarters to downtown Minneapolis in 2021. The company operates facilities in the United States and Canada for production, fulfillment, and administrative functions.

== History ==
=== 1915–1959 ===
Deluxe Corporation was founded in 1915 as Deluxe Check Printers by William Roy (W.R.) Hotchkiss after obtaining a $300 personal loan. Hotchkiss patented several printing innovations, including the Hotchkiss Imprinting Press (1925) and the Hotchkiss Lithograph Press (1928), as well as the first personal flat-pocket checkbook and holder. For much of its early history, Deluxe operations focused exclusively on check printing, with business services added later.

=== 1960–1989 ===
In 1965, Deluxe became a publicly traded company and adopted magnetic ink character recognition (MICR) technology for check printing. By the 1980s, competition in the check printing industry increased, and demand for printed checks began to slow. In 1988, the company simplified the name to Deluxe Corporation.

=== 1990–2010 ===
The adoption of electronic payment systems in the 1990s reduced demand for printed checks, prompting Deluxe to diversify. The company began selling business forms, promotional products, and payroll services, and in the late 1990s and early 2000s acquired firms to expand transaction processing and software capabilities.

In 2004, Deluxe acquired New England Business Services (NEBS), a small business products provider. In 2008, Deluxe announced a strategic shift from primarily print products to a broader business services portfolio. Acquisitions during this period included Hostopia (web hosting), Logo Mojo (logo design), PartnerUp (market intelligence), and MerchEngines (search engine marketing).

=== 2010–2015 ===
Deluxe continued to diversify by acquiring many companies in areas including marketing, payroll, and digital services. Purchases included online printing service PsPrint, marketing firm OrangeSoda, email marketing platform VerticalResponse (2014), and transaction processor Wausau Financial Services (2014). The company also began offering electronic check (eCheck) solutions.

In 2015, Deluxe launched Small Business Revolution, a reality television series distributed on Hulu and Amazon Prime Video, highlighting small business stories.

=== 2015–2020 ===
During this period, Deluxe sought to balance its declining print business with growth in digital services. In December 2016, the company acquired First Manhattan Consulting Group—better known as FMCG Direct—for approximately $200 million. FMCG Direct offered data-driven marketing analytics and insights for financial institutions. The deal enhanced Deluxe's data-driven marketing services and was integrated into its Financial Services segment.

In 2019, the company secured a contract with Synchrony Financial, providing opportunities to sell lockbox processing, data-driven marketing, and treasury management services. In 2020, CEO Barry McCarthy implemented a new organizational structure and management team, including the company's first chief revenue officer. The Small Business Revolution series gained recognition in 2021, including a Daytime Emmy Award nomination.

While the company has accelerated its expansion into payments and data services under CEO Barry McCarthy, Deluxe's check printing business remains a significant revenue source and one of the largest in the U.S. market.

=== 2021–2026 ===
The company announced it would open a FinTech and Customer Innovation Center in Sandy Springs, Georgia, focusing on payment and cloud services.

In April 2021, Deluxe acquired First American Payment Systems, a payment processing company, for $960 million, its largest acquisition at that time, doubling the revenue of its payments segment.

Under McCarthy's leadership, Deluxe payments and data revenue grew significantly, from about 17% of total revenue in 2020 to more than 40% in 2025, while print continued to contribute roughly $700 million annually. The company's "North Star" strategic initiative, launched in 2023, aimed to focus resources on high-growth segments, improve cash flow, and reduce debt.

In August 2025, Deluxe acquired CheckMatch from J.P. Morgan’s Kinexys unit to expand its Deluxe Payment Network, which digitizes paper check delivery and integrates lockbox services. McCarthy has stated that the Deluxe strategy is to continue growing in payments and data while maintaining its check printing operations as a profitable legacy business. Deluxe agreed to acquire Celero Commerce, for $625 million, announcing the deal in June 2026.

=== Company acquisitions ===
Year	Company	Business	Notes
1994	T/Maker	Computer software	Acquired in 1994. The software product lines were later sold to Broderbund.
2004	NEBS (New England Business Services)	Small Business products, stationery	Acquired for approximately $587 million.
2008	Aplus.net, Hostopia	Web hosting	Acquired to expand online services.
2008	VerticalResponse	Email marketing	Expanded Deluxe's digital marketing offerings
2014	Wausau Financial Services	Transaction processing	Acquired to expand payments processing capabilities.
2016	180fusion	Digital marketing	Purchase price undisclosed.
2016	Liquid Web (assets)/RDM Corporation	Web hosting and payment processing	Purchased specific assets from Liquid Web; RDM provided banking software.
2018	MyCorporation, LogoMix, First Data (assets)	Incorporation services, logo design, merchant services	Part of expansion into business formation and branding services.
2021	First American Payment Systems	Payment processing	Acquired for $960 million, doubling payments segment revenue.
2025	CheckMatch (from J.P. Morgan’s Kinexys unit)	Digital lockbox, check digitization	Integrated into Deluxe Payment Network to expand B2B payments capabilities.
2026	Celero Commerce	Payment processing	Acquired for $625 million.

== Corporate overview ==
Deluxe Corporation is a publicly traded company listed on the New York Stock Exchange under the ticker symbol DLX. Headquartered in Minneapolis, Minnesota the company operates four primary business divisions: B2B payments, data, print, and merchant services.

Through its payments platforms, Deluxe processes more than $2.8 trillion in annual transactions for clients that include small businesses, large enterprises, financial institutions, and government agencies. The print division continues to produce personal checks, business checks, business forms, and other printed products for consumers and organizations.

As of 2025, Deluxe remains one of the largest commercial check printers in the United States by volume, even as payments and data solutions account for a growing share of its revenue. For check printing, customers cite Deluxe's national scale, security features, and long-standing relationships with banks and businesses while its integrated payments and data solutions appeal to businesses seeking to consolidate services with a single provider.

== Competitive overview ==
Deluxe competes in multiple sectors, including payment processing, business services, and check printing. In the check printing market, historical competitors have included the John H. Harland Company, described by The New York Times in 2000 as the second-largest printer of checks in the United States, as well as in-house printing operations at retailers such as Walmart.
