= Richard E. McCarty =

Richard E. McCarty is the William D. Gill Professor of Biology at Johns Hopkins University. He also served as Dean of The Johns Hopkins Krieger School of Arts and Sciences for several years. In addition to lecturing in the Biology Department, McCarty oversees a research laboratory, in which graduate and undergraduate students, and post-doctoral fellows conduct various plant biochemistry-related research.

He received his B.A. degree from Johns Hopkins, as well as his Ph.D. degree. He has published dozens of scientific papers about his plant biology research, and is on the review board of several scientific journals as well.

McCarty is the son of Maclyn McCarty, American geneticist who found that the genetic material of living cells is composed of DNA.
