= Carthy =

Carthy is a surname, and may refer to:

- Brian Carthy, Gaelic games correspondent and commentator
- Deborah Carthy-Deu (born 1966), Puerto Rican actress
- Eliza Carthy (born 1975), English folk musician
- John Carthy (1972–2000), Irish citizen who was shot dead by the Garda Emergency Response Unit
- John Dennis Carthy (1923–1972), British zoologist
- Martin Carthy (born 1941), English folk musician

== See also ==
- Carty (name), for derivation
- McCarthy (disambiguation)
