= Charles William McCarthy =

Irish Australian organist, physician, composer

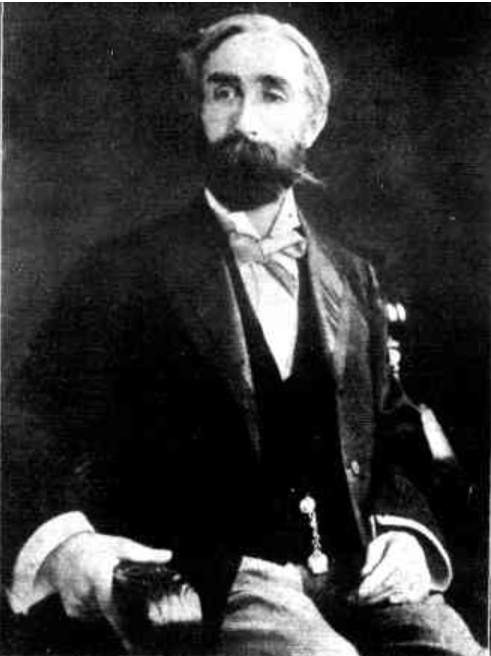
- Portrait of Charles William McCarthy

Background information
- Born: 31 March 1848; Fethard, County Tipperary, Ireland
- Died: 7 June 1919 (aged 71)
- Occupations: Physician, soldier, Composer
- Instruments: organ, violin
- Years active: 1890–1910

Charles William McCarthy, M.D., F.R.C.S.I., was a musician and writer. He was born in Fethard, County Tipperary on 31 March 1848 and died on 7 June 1919.

== Works ==
- 1887 Still Apart
- Our boys, you bet! recruiting song
- The boys of the Dardanelles : song-march (words by Harry Taylor)
- March - The toast of ANZAC
- The boys of the Dardanelles song-march (words by Harry Taylor)
- Back to Tipperary
- Oh! Mother Ashtore
- Lyceum Waltz
- The American boys : a march with vocal refrain

== Personal life and death ==
His daughter Maud was a violinist who married fellow Australian composer Raimund Pechotsch.

McCarthy died on 7 June 1919 and was buried at Waverley Cemetery, following a funeral at St Mary's Cathedral. The Australian poet, Roderic Quinn, wrote a poem in his memory.
