= Brian Carthy =

Irish Gaelic games commentator

Brian Carthy works as a Gaelic games correspondent and commentator for RTÉ, specialising in Gaelic games.

== Early life and family ==
Carthy is a native of Ballymore, near Strokestown, County Roscommon. His mother was Susan.

In 2012, his son John Brian won an All-Ireland U-21 Football Championship medal playing in goal for Dublin against Brian's native Roscommon and was part of the U-21 squad again in 2013.

== Broadcasting career ==
Carthy's first day at RTÉ was 26 May 1980.

In 2011, Carthy was "downgraded" by RTÉ. This prompted a response from numerous Gaelic games figures, including Mickey Harte, Kieran McGeeney and Justin McNulty, who felt this mistreatment of Carthy was unfair. Those who disagreed with RTÉ's treatment of Carthy wrote a four-page letter to director general Noel Curran and boycotted the organisation.

Carthy launched a podcast in August 2022, focusing on Senior Club Championship results.

== Writing career ==
In possession of a nationwide profile, Carthy has also written a number of books with a sporting theme.
