= Kate McCarthy (disambiguation) =

Kate McCarthy (born 1992) is an Australian rules footballer.

Kate McCarthy may also refer to:

- Kate McCarthy (Emmerdale), character on Emmerdale in 2004
- Kate McCarthy (director), British director who has worked with Jessica Harris
- Kate McCarthy (cyclist) (born 1995), New Zealand, winner of the 2024 Gravel and Tar La Femme

== See also ==
- Katie McCarthy (disambiguation)
