= Rick McCarthy =

Rick McCarthy may refer to:

- Rick McCarthy, character in Dreamcatcher (2003 film)
- Rick McCarthy, character, see List of Alias characters

== See also ==
- Richard McCarthy (disambiguation)
