= David McCarty (American football) =

American football player (born 1987)

No. 3
- Position: Tailback

Personal information
- Born: November 19, 1987 (age 38); Gansevoort, New York, U.S.
- Listed height: 6 ft 0 in (1.83 m)
- Listed weight: 215 lb (98 kg)

Career information
- High school: LaSalle Institute, Troy, New York
- College: Albany

Awards and highlights
- Albany career leader in rushing yards (3,353); Albany career leader in all-purpose running yards (3,979); Albany career leader in 100-yard rushing games (19)
- Stats at ESPN

David McCarty (born November 19, 1987) is an American former college football player who was a running back for the Division I Albany Great Danes from 2007 to 2009. A native of Gansevoort, New York, he attended the LaSalle Institute in Troy, New York, before enrolling at the University of Albany. While playing for Albany, he was the second leading rusher in the nation with 1,852 yards. He also set all-time school records for rushing yards (3,353), all-purpose running yards (3,979), and 100-yard rushing games (19). He also scored at least one touchdown in 20 consecutive games and ranks third in Albany school history in career touchdowns (32) and scoring (192 points). In April 2010, McCarty attended the Tampa Bay Buccaneers' rookie minicamp. However, he was not allowed to participate after an EKG test administered by the Buccaneers showed he had an irregular heartbeat.

== Additional sources ==
- McCarty rushes for 167 yards to lead Albany over Robert Morris, Associated Press Archive, November 3, 2007; * McCarty gives Danes'offense its punch, The Daily Gazette (Schenectady, NY), August 19, 2009; * McCarty key for Danes, The Daily Gazette, August 18, 2009;
- Albany's McCarty on record romp, The Saratogian, November 14, 2008;
- Great Danes, McCarthy run past host Red Flash, The Tribune Democrat, October 4, 2009;
- McCarty, Johnson excel for UAlbany, The Daily Gazette, November 18, 2007;
- McCarty healthy for UAlbany homecoming, The Record (Troy, NY), October 10, 2009; * McCarty can climb another rung, The Daily Gazette, October 25, 2008;
- David McCarty (LaSalle/UAlbany) Joins NFL's TB Buccaneers, WRGB CBS TV (Albany), April 27, 2010; *Inspiring Students: Passion on the Gridiron (feature story on McCarty), University of Albany, August 25, 2008;
- "McCarty's 2 TDs lead Albany to 55-10 win". The Seattle Times. October 10, 2009. Archived from the original on June 22, 2011.
- Released McCarty still hopeful of NFL shot, The Troy Record, May 4, 2010,
- UAlbany's David McCarty, a Gansevoort native, heads to Tampa Bay Buccaneers' camp, The Saratogian, April 28, 2010;
- McCarty's 2 TDs lead Albany to 55-10 win, Associated Press Archive - October 10, 2009;
- McCarty's 2 TDs lead Albany past St. Francis 27-6, Associated Press Archive - October 3, 2009;
- McCarty's 237 yards leads Albany past Duquesne, Associated Press Archive - October 4, 2008;
- McCarty's OT run leads Albany past Hofstra, Associated Press Archive - September 14, 2008;
- McCarty rushes for 167 yards to lead Albany over Robert Morris, Associated Press Archive - November 3, 2007;
- McCarty rushes for 2 TDs to give Albany 58-21 win, Associated Press Archive - October 21, 2007;
- McCarty Cleared by Doctor, The Times Union, May 18, 2010 (Former University at Albany running back David McCarty said Monday his doctor gave him a clean bill of health after McCarty tested for an irregular heartbeat during a physical with the Tampa Bay Buccaneers last month.)
- McCarty shot with Bucs put on hold: Test on UAlbany running back shows an irregular heartbeat, McClatchy-Tribune Regional News (USA) - May 4, 2010 (University at Albany running back David McCarty, who hoped to participate in the Tampa Bay Buccaneers'rookie minicamp over the weekend, never made it on the field after failing a physical. McCarty, a La Salle Institute graduate, said an EKG test administered by the Buccaneers on Friday showed he had an irregular heartbeat. ...);
- McCarty runs with NFL opportunity: Ex-UAlbany back to take part in Tampa Bay's minicamp, McClatchy-Tribune Regional News (USA) - April 29, 2010
- McCarty, Richards three-peat All-NEC choices, The Daily Gazette, December 5, 2009;
- McCarty hobbled for Danes'game: Tailback may be limited vs. Central Connecticut, McClatchy-Tribune Regional News (USA) - October 31, 2009;
- Injured McCarty might not play: UAlbany tailback may miss battle of unbeatens, McClatchy-Tribune Regional News (USA) - October 28, 2009.
