= Barry C. McCarthy =

American business executive

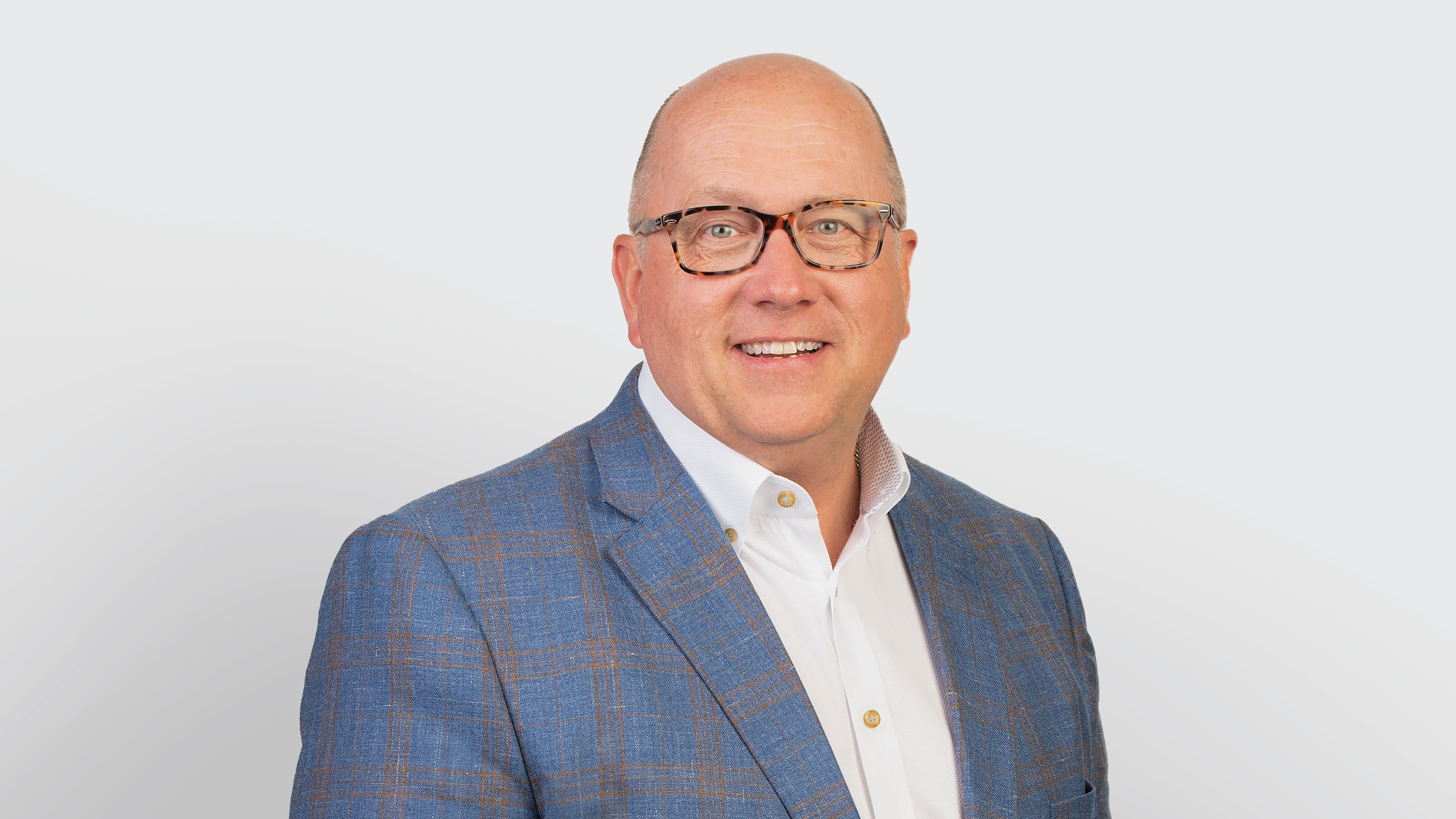
- Barry C. McCarthy, CEO; Deluxe Corporation
- Born: 1963; Chicago, Illinois, United States
- Education: University of Illinois at Urbana–Champaign (BS); Kellogg School of Management at Northwestern University (MBA)
- Occupation: Business executive
- Title: President and CEO, Deluxe Corporation
- Term: November 2018–present
- Predecessor: Lee Schram
- Spouse: Jean Ann McCarthy

Barry C. McCarthy (born 1963) is an American business executive, author, and television producer. McCarthy is President and chief executive officer of Deluxe Corporation.

== Early life and education ==
Barry C. McCarthy was born in 1963 in Chicago, Illinois, the son of Thomas J. and Loretta (née Lind) McCarthy. McCarthy's father was a store manager, and his mother was a schoolteacher. McCarthy earned a bachelor's degree at the University of Illinois Urbana-Champaign, and a Master of Business Administration from the Kellogg School of Management at Northwestern University.

McCarthy married Jean Ann Hood in 1991. They have three children together.

== Career ==
McCarthy began his career at Procter & Gamble. He held executive roles at Wells Fargo and Verisign. McCarthy co-founded MagnaCash, a financial services startup that was acquired by Yaga, Inc., in 2001.

McCarthy joined First Data Corporation in 2004. McCarthy held executive roles at the company, including executive vice president at Network and Security Solutions. McCarthy was responsible for the turnaround of the firm's financial services segment.

McCarthy was appointed President and Chief Executive Officer of Deluxe Corporation in 2018.

== Memberships ==
McCarthy is a board member of Deluxe Corporation, National Urban League, the Robert W. Woodruff Arts Center, Cristo Rey Atlanta Jesuit High School, Metro Atlanta Chamber of Commerce, Minnesota Business Partnership, and the Committee for Economic Development (CED). He is also a former board member of the Junior Achievement of Georgia, Catholic Charities Atlanta, and the Technology Association of Georgia.

== Awards ==
- McCarthy was the executive producer of the television show, "Small Business Revolution". The show was nominated for a television Emmy award in 2021 and 2022.
- In 2022, McCarthy was awarded the EY Entrepreneur of the Year Heartland Award.
- McCarthy was inducted into the Georgia Fintech Hall of Fame in 2024.

== Publications ==
- McCarthy, Barry C. (2021). Small Business Revolution, How Owners and Entrepreneurs Can Succeed. Wiley & Sons, Inc. ISBN 978-1-119-80264-8. It debuted at #2 on the Wall Street Journal Best Sellers list October 23, 2021.
