= Richard McCarthy =

Richard McCarthy may refer to:

- Richard D. McCarthy (1927–1995), American politician
- Richard McCarthy (cricketer) (born 1961), Australian cricketer
- Darby McCarthy (Richard Lawrence McCarthy), Indigenous Australian jockey

== See also ==
- Richie McCarthy (born 1988), Irish hurler
- Rick McCarthy (disambiguation)
