= Walter T. McCarthy =

American judge

Judge of the 35th Circuit Court of Virginia
- In office 1944–1972
- Preceded by: Position established

Judge of 16th Circuit Court of Virginia
- In office 1930–1944
- Preceded by: Howard W. Smith

Personal details
- Born: 1898 Richmond, Virginia, U.S.
- Died: March 18, 1985 (aged 86–87) Stuart, Florida, U.S.
- Spouse: Ruth Clark
- Children: 5
- Education: George Washington University; George Washington University Law School
- Occupation: judge; lawyer

Walter T. McCarthy (1898 – March 18, 1985) was an American lawyer and judge. He served as a circuit court judge from 1930 to 1972 in Arlington, Virginia.

== Early life ==
Walter T. McCarthy was born in 1898, in Richmond, Virginia and moved to Arlington, Virginia at a young age. He did not finish high school. He graduated from George Washington University and then graduated from George Washington University Law School. He was a member of Kappa Sigma fraternity.

== Career ==
In 1930, McCarthy became the judge of Virginia's 16th Circuit Court, which then represented Arlington County, Fairfax County, Prince William County and the city of Alexandria. He succeeded Howard W. Smith. He was the youngest circuit court judge appointed in Virginia at the time. In 1944, McCarthy was elected to Virginia's 35th Circuit Court, representing Arlington County. In the 1950s, McCarthy ruled in a major decision that gave Arlington County Board the right to reject zoning applications in order to curb growth. He also ruled on other decisions that formed much of Arlington County's zoning laws. In 1958, McCarthy ruled that racial segregation at churches, movie theaters and other public places was unconstitutional.

McCarthy retired in 1972, but continued hearing cases until 1980.

== Personal life ==
McCarthy married Ruth Clark of Washington, D.C. Together, they had five children: Steve, Wilson, Walter, Robert and Helen.

== Death and legacy ==
McCarthy died on March 18, 1985, while on vacation in Stuart, Florida.

The Walter T. McCarthy Law Library in the Arlington Courthouse was named after him.
