= Matt McCarthy =

Matt McCarthy may refer to:

- Matt McCarthy (comedian) (born 1979), American stand-up comedian, writer, and actor
- Matt McCarthy (basketball) (born 1996), Australian basketball player
- Matt McCarthy, former American minor league baseball player who wrote the autobiography Odd Man Out: A Year on the Mound with a Minor League Misfit
- Matthew McCarthy (born 1981), former Australian rules footballer
