= Robert McCarthy =

Robert McCarthy may refer to:

- Robert McCarthy (tennis) (1924–2001), Australian tennis player
- Robert E. McCarthy (1940–2022), American politician in the state of Massachusetts
- Robert I. McCarthy (1920–2007), American politician in the state of California
- Robert J. McCarthy, American hotel executive
- Robert W. McCarthy (1924–2015), American politician in the state of Illinois
- Bob McCarthy (born 1946), Australian rugby league footballer and coach
- Bob McCarthy (footballer) (born 1948), English footballer

== See also ==
- Robert-Jon McCarthy (born 1994), Australian, naturalized Irish, road cyclist
