= Gneeveguilla GAA =

Gaelic Games Club in County Kerry, Ireland

Gneeveguilla
- Gníomh go Leith
- Founded: 1960
- County: Kerry
- Colours: Yellow and green
- Grounds: Paddy O'Leary Memorial Park
- Coordinates: 52°07′10.11″N 9°16′15.00″W

Playing kits
Standard colours

Gneeveguilla are a Gaelic football team from County Kerry, Ireland. They play in the Kerry Intermediate Football Championship, Kerry County Football League (Division 1) and the East Kerry Senior Football Championship.

The club was founded in 1960. Its facilities include a bar, meeting rooms, office, kitchen, gym and dressing rooms. The hall received renovations and extensions in late 2013.

The club has won several county and provincial titles, and reached the All-Ireland Junior Club Football Championship final in 2022. Club member Ambrose O'Donovan was captain of the Kerry team which won the Centenary All-Ireland in 1984.

== Honours ==
- County Club Championships: (1) 1980
- Kerry Intermediate Football Championship: (1) 2010
- Munster Intermediate Club Football Championship: (1) 2010
- Kerry Premier Junior Football Championship: (1) 2021
- Munster Junior Club Football Championship: (1) 2021
- Kerry Junior Football Championships: (2) 1978, 2000,
- Kerry Minor Football Championships: (1) 1985
- East Kerry Senior Football Championships: (4) 1979, 1980, 1983, 2003

== Notable players ==
- Charlie McCarthy
- Liam Murphy
- Ambrose O'Donovan 1984 All-Ireland Senior Football Championship winning captain.
