= Joanne McCarthy =

Joanne McCarthy may refer to:

- Joanne McCarthy (basketball), American basketball player
- Joanne McCarthy (journalist), Australian journalist

== See also ==
- Joanne McCartney, British politician
