= David McCarthy =

David or Dave McCarthy may refer to:

- David McCarthy (politician) (1925–1973), unionist politician in Northern Ireland
- David McCarthy (sprinter) (born 1983), Irish sprint athlete from Dublin who medalled at the 2004 World Indoors
- David McCarthy (long-distance runner) (born 1988), Irish long-distance athlete from Waterford who medalled at the 2009 European Under-23s
- David J. McCarthy Jr., dean of the Georgetown University Law Center
- Dave McCarthy (Gaelic footballer) (born 1949), Irish Gaelic football player
- Dave McCarthy (hurler) (born 1994), Irish hurler
