= Katie McCarthy =

Katie McCarthy may refer to:

- Katie McCarthy, character in All Good Things (film)
- Katie McCarthy, character in Deceit played by Emily Barclay
- Catherine McCarthy, producer of Fossil Detectives

== See also ==
- Kate McCarthy (disambiguation)
