= Charlie McCarthy (Gaelic footballer) =

Irish Gaelic footballer

Personal information
- Born: Gneeveguilla, County Kerry
- Height: 5 ft 9 in (175 cm)

Sport
- Sport: Gaelic football
- Position: Half back
Club
- Years: Club
- 1990's-2000's: Gneeveguilla
Club titles
- Kerry titles: 3
Inter-county
Years	County	Apps (scores)
1996	Kerry	4 (0-00)
Inter-county titles
- Munster titles: 1
- All-Irelands: 0
- NFL: 0
- All Stars: 0

Charlie McCarthy (born in Gneeveguilla, County Kerry, Ireland) played Gaelic football with his local club Gneeveguilla. At the age of 19 he was a member of the Kerry senior inter-county team during the 1996 Championship campaign. That year Kerry won their first Munster Championship since 1991. McCarthy was part of the Kerry team that won the 1995 and 1996 All Ireland Under 21 titles. He also won an All Ireland Minor Medal with Kerry in 1994, the last time Kerry won the All Ireland minor competition. McCarthy played centre back and won the "man of the match award" in that game. He won three consecutive Kerry Senior County Championship medals with East Kerry in 1997, 1998 and 1999.
