= Justin McCarthy (artist) =

American painter (1891–1977)

- Born: May 13, 1891; Hazleton, Pennsylvania
- Died: July 14, 1977 (aged 86); Tucson, Arizona

Justin McCarthy (May 13, 1891–July 14, 1977) was a self-taught American artist. His work is in many important collections, including those of the American Folk Art Museum, the Milwaukee Art Museum, the Petullo Collection, the Philadelphia Museum of Art, and the Smithsonian American Art Museum. The New York Times has praised his "paintings and drawings of gestural force and narrative interest." McCarthy's imagery anticipates the Pop art of the 1960s.

== Life and work ==
McCarthy lived for almost his entire life in the small town of Weatherly, Pennsylvania, where his family was well established (a patrician background uncommon among self-taught artists). He failed his second year exams while in law school at the University of Pennsylvania, which led to a severe mental breakdown, after which he was institutionalized for years before returning "to his family's decayed mansion, where he lived with his mother." (Note: For the fact that the breakdown followed on the failure of his exams, see any of the references (except Hughes).) This breakdown saved him from the trenches of World War I, but considerably reduced his professional prospects. McCarthy then turned to art as a therapeutic outlet from the menial work he was limited to by his precarious mental health. His mother died in 1940, leaving him alone in the big, dilapidated house (which was grand enough to have its own theatre for the staging of plays). His art depicts figures from popular culture as well as animals, biblical scenes, and everyday life. Pictorially, he had a predilection for glamorous women—movie stars, fashion models, and other celebrities—as well as sports heroes. This interest in popular culture was not uncommon among American artists in the 1920s: both Stuart Davis and Gerard Murphy incorporated the visual argot of advertising into a bright Cubist syntax. Unlike these proto-Pop artists, however, McCarthy's style is expressionist, with a highly gestural and textured appearance that readily calls to mind works by European masters such as Emil Nolde and Chaïm Soutine. (The most significant early "discoverer" and promoter of McCarthy's art, Sterling Strauser, characterized his style as "naive expressionist.")
