= Carolyn A. McCarty =

American psychologist (born 1972)

- Born: Carolyn Askren McCarty; 1972 (age 53–54)
- Other name: Cari McCarty
- Occupation: Professor
- Title: Research Professor

Academic background
- Education: University of California, Los Angeles
- Thesis: Affective attitudes among mothers of clinic-referred children (2000)
- Doctoral advisor: John R. Weisz

Academic work
- Discipline: General Pediatrics
- Sub-discipline: Psychiatry, mental health, major depressive disorders
- Institutions: University of Washington

Carolyn Askren McCarty (born 1972) is an American psychologist. She is a research professor of pediatrics and adjunct research associate professor of psychology in the department of pediatrics at University of Washington (UW). McCarty is the director of research and development in adolescent medicine at UW. She was the lead author on a study about health care resources available for suicidal teenagers. In 2000, McCarty completed a Ph.D. at the University of California, Los Angeles. Her doctoral advisor was John R. Weisz.

From September 2014 to September 2020, McCarty led a project with the Agency for Healthcare Research and Quality, entitled "Improving Teen Care With Health IT".
