= Feardana Ua Cárthaigh =

Feardana Ua Cárthaigh (died 1131), Chief Poet of Connacht.

== Overview ==
The Annals of the Four Masters state, sub anno 1131, that "Feardana Ua Carthaigh, chief poet of Connaught", was killed at the battle of Loch Semhdighdhe in Mide.

The Ua Cárthaigh (anglicised Carthy) family were located in Ui Maine, though apparently not members of the dynasty.

== See also ==
- Michael Carty (1916–1975), Irish politician.

| Preceded by Muireadhach Ua Carthaigh | Chief Poet of Connacht; 1097?–1131 | Succeeded by Aindileas Ua Chlúmháin |
