= John Dennis Carthy =

British zoologist and ethologist

John Dennis Carthy (7 April 1923 – 13 March 1972) was a British zoologist and ethologist whose primary study subjects were the sensory systems and behaviour of invertebrates. He published 11 books and numerous scientific articles.

== Life and career ==
John D Carthy went to Bedford School, and received his undergraduate training at Christ’s College at the University of Cambridge. During WW2 he served in the Operational Research Section of the RAF Bomber Command, after which he returned to Cambridge, and completed first his undergraduate studies and subsequently obtained a PhD at Cambridge in 1950. He joined the faculty of the Zoology Department at Queen Mary College, London in 1950, where he remained until his death in 1972.

In 1967, he became the first Scientific Director of the Field Studies Council, where he led the establishment of the Oil Pollution Research Unit at Orielton Field Studies Centre, Pembrokeshire and the setting up of the Epping Forest Conservation Centre. He was a fellow of the Institute of Biology and a Secretary of the Association for the Study of Animal Behaviour (ASAB) and the Society for Experimental Biology and a council member of the Royal Entomological Society (vice presidency in 1962). In honour of his contributions, a prize is awarded annually to a final year BSc Psychology student at Queen Mary University of London who shows substantial academic achievement.

John Carthy was a prominent science communicator, with many appearances on popular radio and television programmes, e.g. the BBC’s "Meet the Professor", "Tonight", "Nature Parliament" and "Young Scientists of the Year".

== Books ==
- John D Carthy "Animal Navigation: how Animals Find their Way about" Allen & Unwin, London, 1956
- John D Carthy "An Introduction to the Behaviour of Invertebrates" Allen & Unwin, London, 1958
- John D Carthy "The World of Feeling" Phoenix House, London, 1960
- John D Carthy & Charles Lionel Duddington (eds) "Viewpoints in Biology" Butterworths, London 1962
- John D Carthy & Francis John Govier Ebling (eds) "The Natural History of Aggression" Academic Press, London, New York, 1964
- John D Carthy "The Behaviour of Arthropods" W. H. Freeman, San Francisco, 1965
- John D Carthy & Aaron E Klein "Animals and their ways; the science of animal behavior" Natural History Press, Garden City, 1965
- John D Carthy "The Study of Behaviour" St Martins Press, New York, 1966
- John D Carthy & G.E. Newell "Invertebrate Receptors" Academic Press, New York, 1968
- John D Carthy & Don R Arthur "The Biological Effects of Oil Pollution on Littoral Communities: Proceedings of a Symposium Held at the Orielton Field Centre, Pembroke, Wales, on 17th, 18th and 19th February 1968", Field Studies Council, London, 1968.
- John D Carthy & Colin Threadgall "Animal Camouflage" McGraw Hill, New York, 1972.

== Articles ==
- Odour trails of Acanthomyops fuliginosus. Nature, 166, 1950, p. 154;
- The orientation of two allied species of British ant. I. Visual direction finding in Acanthomyops niger. Behaviour, 3, 1951, pp. 275–303;
- Odour trail laying and following in Acanthomyops fuliginosus. Behaviour, 3, 1951, pp. 304–318;
- Do animals see polarized light? New Scientist, 10, 1961, pp. 660–662;
- Color vision in invertebrates. In: Symp. of the Inst. of Biology, No. 12 "Colour and Life", London 1964
