= McCarthy =

McCarthy (also spelled MacCarthy or McCarty) may refer to:

- MacCarthy dynasty, a Gaelic Irish clan
- McCarthy, Alaska, United States
- McCarty, Missouri, United States
- McCarthy Road, a road in Alaska
- McCarthy (band), an indie pop band
- Château MacCarthy, a Bordeaux wine
- McCarthy Tétrault, a Canadian law firm
- McCarthy evaluation, programming-language semantics also called short-circuit evaluation
- McCarty Creek, a stream in Missouri, United States
- McCarthy Scales of Children's Abilities, a psychological test given to young children
- McCarthy-Dundon, an Irish roadman gang
- MacCarthy Island, island on Gambia River, in eastern Gambia

== People ==
- McCarthy (surname)

== See also ==
- McCarthyism, a practice of making accusations, named after U.S. Senator Joseph McCarthy
