= Steve McCarthy (boxer) =

Former Boxer

Personal information
- Nickname: Big Mac
- Nationality: British
- Born: 30 July 1962 London, England
- Died: 30 June 2017 (aged 54) Southampton, England
- Height: 5 ft 11 in (1.80 m)
- Weight: Light Heavyweight

Boxing career
- Stance: Southpaw

Boxing record
- Total fights: 17
- Wins: 12
- Win by KO: 5
- Losses: 4
- Draws: 1

Steve McCarthy (30 July 1962 – 30 June 2017) was a British former boxer who had been British light heavyweight champion in 1990.

== Career ==
Southampton local McCarthy began his professional career in February 1987 with a win over Russell Burnett. He was unbeaten in his first 10 fights, which included a win over Serg Fame in November 1988 to take the BBBofC Southern Area light heavyweight title at Applemore Recreation Centre, and a points victory over former Belgian Light Heavyweight and Cruiserweight championYves Monsieur.

Highly rated and tipped for potential stardom, he suffered his first defeat in September 1989 to Tony Wilson in an eliminator for the English title at Southampton Guildhall, in one of boxing's most unusual fights. Entering the fight as the underdog against the former British Champion, McCarthy dominated the opening stanzas proceeding to knock Wilson down in the third round and was looking to finish the fight with Wilson pinned on the ropes. The fight was stopped when Wilson's 62-year-old mother climbed into the ring and started attacking McCarthy with her shoe, and Wilson's corner man also entered the ring. McCarthy believed he had won and left the ring, but bizarrely referee Adrian Morgan insisted that the fight should continue. McCarthy refused (the injury caused by Wilson's mother required four stitches) and Wilson was declared the winner by technical knockout. A riot ensued and Wilson's mother had to be dragged from the ring by her hair by a security guard; McCarthy returned to the ring but only to calm the crowd. A BBBofC enquiry upheld the result but ordered a rematch, but McCarthy pulled out, suffering from flu.

McCarthy's next fight came in October 1990 at Battersea Town Hall in a rematch against Fame for the British light-heavyweight title vacated by Tom Collins; McCarthy won on points to become British champion in what was dubbed as a "masterclass" from the new British Champion.

McCarthy suffered his first defeat at the hands of another boxer in April 1992 when he was disqualified in the ninth round against German Olympic gold medallist Henry Maske in Düsseldorf. He also lost via disqualification to Dariusz Michalczewski in Hamburg in September that year. In April 1993 he was stopped by Simon Harris in the fifth round, and he finished his career in February 1994 with a points win over Karl Barwise.
