= Little Black Creek =

Physical characteristics
- Source
  - location: confluence of two unnamed tributaries on the border between Hazle Township and Lattimer
  - elevation: between 1,740 and 1,760 feet (530 and 540 m)
- Mouth
  - location: Black Creek in Hazle Township
  - coordinates: 40°58′39″N 75°58′57″W
  - elevation: 1,492 ft (455 m)
- Length: 2.2 mi (3.5 km)
- Discharge
  - average: 0.6 cu ft/s (0.017 m^{3}/s)

Basin features
- Progression: Black Creek → Nescopeck Creek → Susquehanna River → Chesapeake Bay

Little Black Creek is a tributary of Black Creek in Luzerne County, Pennsylvania, in the United States. It is approximately 2.2 miles (3.5 km) long and flows through Lattimer, Harleigh, and Hazle Township. The watershed of the creek is largely on coal mining land. It only has an intermittent flow and some of its waters drain into the Jeddo Tunnel instead of Black Creek. The creek is in the Eastern Middle Anthracite Field. There is at least one bridge crossing the creek.

== Course ==
Little Black Creek begins at the confluence of two unnamed tributaries on the border between Hazle Township and Lattimer. It flows west and slightly south for more than a mile before turning south-southwest for some distance. By this point, the creek has begun to flow along the border between Hazle Township and Harleigh. After several tenths of a mile, the creek fully enters Hazle Township and crosses Pennsylvania Route 309. A short distance further downstream, it reaches its confluence with Black Creek.

== Geography and geology ==
The elevation near the mouth of Little Black Creek is 1,492 feet (455 m) above sea level. The elevation of the creek's source is between 1,740 and 1,760 feet (530 and 540 m) above sea level. Both the source and the mouth of the creek are in the United States Geological Survey quadrangle of Hazleton.

The Jeddo Tunnel drains water from the Little Black Creek Coal Basin. Jeddo Tunnel A passes through this coal basin. Little Black Creek is one of four surface streams that successfully exits the Jeddo Tunnel basin. It is the third-largest of the streams that do so.

Little Black Creek has been described by Bloomsburg University professor Duane Braun as having "sharp, multiple crest hydrography". The stream bed of the creek changes course at least fairly regularly. The creek is near the Woodside Coal Basin, which is a natural sub-basin that has been reclaimed. Coal basins are under 30 percent of the creek's drainage basin and the area in the vicinity of the creek has been heavily mined.

== Hydrology and watershed ==
The Little Black Creek Coal Basin has an area of 4.64 square miles (12.0 km^{2}). Most of the watershed is in Hazle Township and Butler Township, but a small portion of the northeastern part of the watershed is in the borough of Freeland. The entirety of the watershed is within the Jeddo Tunnel drainage basin. The creek's watershed makes up 14 percent of the Jeddo Tunnel watershed.

Most of the watershed of Little Black Creek is in the Eastern Middle Anthracite Field, which is part of the Anthracite Upland Section of the Ridge and Valley Province. The watershed of Little Black Creek is adjacent to the watersheds of Black Creek and Nescopeck Creek.

The headwaters of Little Black Creek are east of Pardeesville and the mouth of the creek is near Hazleton. A pond is located in the upper reaches of the watershed.

Little Black Creek does not perennially have any discharge. Instead, it has an intermittent or rare discharge. The runoff levels of the creek was measured six times between October 1997 and October 1998. The runoff was measured to be 0 all but two times. The remaining two times, the runoff was 1 cubic foot per second and 2.4 cubic feet per second. The Little Black Creek Coal Basin contributes 11.43 cubic feet per second of water to the Jeddo Tunnel's outflow.

== History ==
The Nescopeck Path historically crossed Little Black Creek.

A concrete slab bridge carrying Pennsylvania Route 309 over Little Black Creek was built in 1928. It is 22.0 feet (6.7 m) long. There are plans to reestablish the channel of the creek or construct it from scratch in its upper reaches. There are ten mining permits in the Little Black Creek Coal Basin. The upper reaches of the creek has had its course altered by mining.

Little Black Creek was entered into the Geographic Names Information System on January 1, 1990. Its identifier in the Geographic Names Information System is 1202231.

Little Black Creek is mentioned in The North American Journals of Prince Maximilian of Wied.

== See also ==
- Gravel Run (Black Creek), next named tributary of Black Creek going downstream
- List of rivers of Pennsylvania
