= Descendants of William Bradford (Plymouth governor) =

William Bradford (1590–1657) was the governor of Plymouth Colony (now part of Massachusetts) for most of his life. Descendants of William Bradford, some of whom are listed here, have achieved noteworthy standing in numerous fields.

== Descendants ==
- Serena Armstrong-Jones, Countess of Snowdon, wife of David Armstrong-Jones, 2nd Earl of Snowdon
- Mabel Keyes Babcock, American landscape architect
- Augustus Williamson Bradford (January 9, 1806 – March 1, 1881), a Democrat, was the 32nd Governor of Maryland in the United States from 1862 to 1866. He served as governor during the Civil War.
- The Baldwin brothers: Alec, Daniel, William, and Stephen, American actors
- Ambrose Bierce, American dystopian novelist and satirist
- Gamaliel Bradford I (1704–1778), an American colonel and great-grandson of William Bradford
- Gamaliel Bradford II (1731–1807), an American (Patriot) lieutenant colonel in the Continental Army during the American Revolutionary War
- Gamaliel Bradford III (1763–1824), an American sea captain and privateer in the Quasi-War with France; the USS Bradford (DD-545) was named for him
- Gamaliel Bradford IV (1795–1839), an American physician, superintendent of Massachusetts General Hospital, and abolitionist
- Gamaliel Bradford V (1831–1911), an American banker from Boston, Massachusetts who helped organize the American Anti-Imperialist League
- Gamaliel Bradford VI (1863–1932), American biographer, critic, poet, dramatist, and journalist
- Robert F. Bradford (1902-1983), American lawyer, Republican Party strategist, and Governor of Massachusetts from 1947 to 1949
- William Bradford (1624–1703), son of Governor William Bradford of the Mayflower and military commander of the Plymouth forces during King Philip's War
- William Bradford (1729–1808), American physician, lawyer, and U.S. Senator from Rhode Island
- William Bradford (1823–1892), American painter, photographer, and explorer
- James G. Carter, American congregational minister, Massachusetts State Representative, and pioneer of Normal schools and public education
- Julia Child, American entrepreneur and chef of French and French-influenced cuisine
- Frederic Edwin Church, American landscape painter
- Charles W. Comstock, United States Attorney for the District of Connecticut and former Connecticut judge
- The Dimmicks (SE was a first cousin of brothers MM and WH, and father of JB. SE was also the father-in-law to eventual second wife of Benjamin Harrison.)
  - J. Benjamin Dimmick (1858–1920), Mayor of Scranton, Pennsylvania
  - Milo Melankthon Dimmick (1811–1872), U.S. Representative from Pennsylvania, 1849–1853, candidate for president; Judge in Pennsylvania 1853
  - Samuel E. Dimmick (1822–1875), Pennsylvania Attorney General (1873–1875).
  - William Harrison Dimmick (1815–1861), Prosecuting Attorney of Wayne County, Pennsylvania, 1836–1837; Pennsylvania State Senator, 1845–1847; U.S. Representative from Pennsylvania, 1857–1861
- Frank Nelson Doubleday, American publisher, and his descendants, including Nelson Doubleday, Nelson Doubleday, Jr., and Russell Doubleday
- George Eastman, American inventor and the founder of the Eastman Kodak Company
- Clint Eastwood, American film actor, director, and producer
- Harold Eugene Edgerton, professor at MIT; developer of pioneering stop-action photographic techniques and electronic flashes
- Catherine Drew Gilpin Faust, (born September 18, 1947), is an American historian, college administrator, and the president of Harvard University.
- Sally Field (born November 6, 1946) is an American actress, singer, producer, director, and screenwriter.
- Charles Dana Gibson, Life magazine publisher and illustrator, best known for his "Gibson Girl" drawings
- Hugh Hefner, Playboy founder
- Daniel Gibson Knowlton, classicist bookbinder at Brown University
- Edward "Ned" Lamont, American businessman and politician, 89th Governor of Connecticut
- John Lithgow, American actor and philanthropist
- Jan Masaryk, Czechoslovak diplomat and politician
- George B. McClellan, Civil War general, Governor of New Jersey, Democratic opponent of Abraham Lincoln in the 1864 United States presidential election
- Michaela Paetsch (1961-2023), American violinist and the first American female to have recorded all 24 Paganini Caprices for solo violin.
- Thomas Pynchon, American short story writer and novelist
- Christopher Reeve, American film actor and political activist
- William Rehnquist, Associate Justice of the United States Supreme Court from 1972 to 1986 and Chief Justice of the United States from 1986 until his death in 2005
- Deborah Sampson, female member of the Continental Army in the American Revolutionary War
- Benjamin Spock, child care specialist and author
- Adlai Stevenson III, United States Democratic Senator representing Illinois from 1970 to 1981, two-time candidate for Governor of Illinois
- Arthur Ochs Sulzberger, Jr., publisher of The New York Times since 1992
- Charles Sumner, American statesman and Republican Party politician
- Telford Taylor, Second Chief Prosecutor at the Nuremberg Trials
- Dick Thornburgh, former Pennsylvania governor and US Attorney General
- Noah Webster, American educator, journalist, and lexicographer noted for the Webster's Dictionary
- William Collins Whitney, American financier and politician, and his descendants, the Whitney family
- Lyman Spitzer Jr., American theoretical physicist, astronomer and mountaineer. Namesake of NASA's Spitzer Space Telescope.
- Ariovistus Pardee, American engineer, coal baron, philanthropist, and director of the Lehigh Valley Railroad. Founder of Hazeltown, Pennsylvania.
- Ario Pardee Jr., officer in the Union Army during the American Civil War, son of Ariovistus Pardee.
- Calvin Pardee, businessman from Pennsylvania, son of Ariovistus Pardee.
- Harold E. B. Pardee, American cardiologist
- Nick Folk, American football placekicker for the New York Jets.

== See also ==
- William Bradford
