= Pardee (surname) =

Pardee is a surname. Notable people with the surname include:

- Alex Pardee (born 1976), American Artist
- Ario Pardee (1810–1892), American coal magnate
- Ario Pardee Jr. (1839–1901), American Civil War Brevet Brigadier general
- Arthur Pardee (1921–2019), American biochemist
- Calvin Pardee (1841–1923), American businessman
- Enoch H. Pardee (1829–1896), American medical doctor and politician
- Frederick S. Pardee (1932–2022), American economist, real estate investor and philanthropist
- George Pardee (1857–1941), 21st Governor of California
- Harold E. B. Pardee (1886–1973), American cardiologist
- Irving H. Pardee (1892–1949), American neurologist
- Jack Pardee (1936–2013), American football player and coach
- Joseph Pardee (1871–1960), American geologist
- Sarah Lockwood Pardee (Winchester), Builder of the Winchester Mystery House
- Timothy Blair Pardee (1830–1889), Ontario lawyer and political figure
- Rudy Pardee, founder of the LA Dream Team
