= Lenny Silverberg =

- Born: 1939; Brooklyn, New York

Lenny Silverberg (born 1939, Brooklyn, New York) is a multidisciplinary artist known for his portraits of the unhoused during a homeless crisis in New York City's SoHo neighborhood in the early 1980s, his works with artist Bruce Conner, and documenting his wife's decline through dementia in his book Either Way its Perfect.

Silverberg's works became popular in San Francisco, when the artist moved there to join friends in Haight-Ashbury and began to show in galleries throughout the city. In 1976, Thomas Albright of the San Francisco Chronicle described his work as "hard to describe...Their effect is one of wild convulsive emotional outpouring" and "he has some fresh and poetic ideas about the qualities of space and form and images".

== Museums and collections ==
- The Library of Congress collections
- Grundwald Collection at UCLA
- San Francisco Museum of Modern Art
- Achenbach Collection at The Legion Of Honor in San Francisco
- Center For Book Arts
