= Daniel G. Knowlton =

American classicist bookbinder

- Born: November 14, 1922; Washington, DC, USA
- Died: June 11, 2015 (aged 92); Bristol, Rhode Island
- Years active: 1956-1992
- Organization: Brown University
- Known for: Bookbinding, restoration
- Spouse: Lavina "Nina" Fales
- Children: Jean Catherine Knowlton; Daniel Charles Knowlton
- Parent(s): Daniel W. Knowlton; Josephine Gibson Knowlton

Daniel Gibson Knowlton (November 14, 1922 – June 11, 2015) was an American classicist bookbinder at Brown University. Knowlton was the nephew of illustrator Charles Dana Gibson and a descendant of Plymouth Colony governor William Bradford.

== Biography ==
Daniel Gibson Knowlton was born to Daniel W. Knowlton, assistant chief of counsel to the Interstate Commerce Commission, and Josephine Gibson Knowlton, the sister of renowned graphic artist and former Life magazine publisher Charles Dana Gibson. He was the great-great-grandson of U.S. Senator James DeWolf and the great-great-great-grandson of U.S. Senator William Bradford. At the age of four, he took a short flight with Charles Lindbergh, making him the youngest person to have flown with the aviation pioneer at that time. In 1928, he met President Herbert Hoover in the White House. At age 7, Knowlton was diagnosed with mastoiditis and endured operations that were only temporarily successful. His hearing disability was later corrected with the introduction of the hearing aid.

Knowlton studied bookbinding in Washington, D.C. under Marion Lane, who was trained by preeminent binder Francis Sangorski of London. In 1935, he acquired bookbinding equipment from a woman who was about to sell her bindery to the Library of Congress.

On October 19, 1949, Knowlton married Lavina "Nina" Fales of Bristol, Rhode Island in a ceremony held at his family's historic Longfield House. They had two children, Jean Catherine Knowlton and Daniel Charles Knowlton. In 1969, he inherited Longfield from his mother and passed on the house in 1972, when it was added to the National Register of Historic Places. Daniel Knowlton died on June 11, 2015.

=== Bookbinding work ===
In 1956, Knowlton became a member of the Guild of Bookworkers. That year, he started work at John Carter Brown Library at Brown University, which had been without an in-house bookbinder for 40 years. Over the years, he worked at the Annmary Brown, Rockefeller, and John Hay libraries across the campus.

In the early 1970s, Knowlton acquired Markey & Asplund Bookbinders from the Asplund family in Providence, Rhode Island. He expanded the bindery's operations by offering restoration services. Knowlton attracted apprentices of hand binding and offered certificates for his classes. His students included Karen Dugan, Steven Hales, Christine Merrikin Musser, Richard Minsky Eric Zimmerman, and Richard Frieder. Knowlton had met Minsky in 1968 at Brown University. Knowlton exhibited his work at the Center for Book Arts, founded by Minsky in 1974. In 1981, Knowlton sold the bindery to Eric Zimmerman and Richard Frieder. Frieder later sold his portion of the business to Eric and Kenda Zimmerman who moved it to Foster RI and operated it for many years.

Knowlton retired from Brown University in 1992. He continued to work and teach bookbinding part-time at his Longfield Studio in Bristol until 2014. He died in 2015, aged 92.
