= Gravel Run =

Gravel Run may refer to:

- Gravel Run (French Creek tributary), in Crawford County, Pennsylvania
- Gravel Run (Black Creek), in Luzerne County, Pennsylvania
- Gravel Run, Michigan, a historic settlement
- Gravel Run (Susquehanna River), in Northumberland County, Pennsylvania
