= Pardee =

Pardee may refer to:

== People ==
- Pardee (surname)
- Pardee Butler, American clergyman and abolitionist

== Places ==
=== United States ===
- Pardee, Kansas
- Pardee, Virginia
- Pardee, West Virginia
- Pardee Home
- Boston University Frederick S. Pardee School of Global Studies
- Frederick S. Pardee RAND Graduate School
- Pardee Reservoir and dam named in honor of George Pardee
