= Richard Minsky =

- Born: January 7, 1947 (age 79); New York City, USA
- Education: Brooklyn College; Brown University
- Organization: Center for Book Arts
- Known for: Bookbinding, book art
- Website: minsky.com

Richard P. Minsky (born January 7, 1947) is an American scholar of bookbinding and a book artist. He is the founder of the Center for Book Arts in New York City.

== Background ==
In 1960, Minsky obtained his first printing press at the age of 13 to replace the Superior "Cub" rotary Printing Press he had received as a gift in 1957. This Kelsey 5x8" platen press became the foundation for a lifelong career in the book arts.

In 1968, he graduated cum laude in economics from Brooklyn College. Minsky was awarded a fellowship at Brown University, where he received his master's degree in economics. He pursued a Ph.D. at The New School for Social Research, but left after two years to pursue bookbinding, art and music. He studied bookbinding in Providence, Rhode Island with master bookbinder Daniel Gibson Knowlton, whom he met at the John D. Rockefeller, Jr. Library at Brown University.

The most important thing isn't where you study – it's how good your work is. I don't hire anybody based on their schooling – I look at what they can do.

— Richard P. Minsky

In 1974, Minsky founded the Center for Book Arts in Manhattan, the first organization of its kind in the United States dedicated to contemporary interpretations of the book as an art object while preserving traditional practices of the art of the book. In 1978, he was named a US/UK Bicentennial Fellow in Visual Art by the National Endowment for the Arts and the British Council. Minsky stated that he does not believe in talent and that he simply continues to become better at bookbinding through his persistence since his first "awful" attempts in 1968.

In 2004, Yale University Library acquired Minsky's archive of published fine art editions and other works. The Robert B. Haas Family Arts Library at Yale University is hosting an exhibition of 50 years of Minsky's work from August to November 2010.

== SLART trademark dispute ==
In 2006, Minsky opened a virtual gallery in Second Life and published an e-mag, which was also distributed in world and published online, about art in the Second Life virtual world. He called both ‘SLART’. In 2007, Minsky applied for registration of the SLART trademark by the United States Patent and Trademark Office. The mark was registered on March 18, 2008.

In February 2008, Minsky contacted the Virtual Intellectual Property Organization (VIPO) to enforce his rights to the SLART trademark against users in the Second Life virtual world. VIPO was founded by intellectual property attorney Tamiko Franklin. On July 29, 2008, Minsky filed suit against Linden Lab, the creator of Second Life, because one of its users infringed on his trademark registration of SLART. Tamiko Franklin, under the Second Life avatar Juris Amat, sent cease and desist letters to users regarding unauthorized use in world of the registered SLART trademark.

In September 2008, Linden Lab responded by filing suit with the United States Patent and Trademark Office in an attempt to cancel Minsky's trademark registration. Franklin represented Minsky during the cancellation procedure filed by Linden Lab before the United States Patent and Trademarks Offices’ Trademark Trial and Appeal Board. On September 4, 2008, the U.S. District Court of Northern New York granted Minsky a temporary restraining order barring the use of SLART by other Second Life users.

The order provided that the trademark owner notify the online service provider of the identified infringement and allowed the provider two days to commence response to the infringement action and five days to complete it. The order also gave the trademark owner the right to obtain real-world identities of the infringer from the company if a prima facie case of infringement exists. This represents the first temporary restraining order granted by a federal judge for enforcement in a virtual environment of a federally registered trademark first used in a virtual environment. It affirmatively establishes the existence of virtual intellectual property rights.

The court order from federal judge Lawrence E. Kahn documented Minsky's contention that the term SLART has multiple colloquial or slang meanings, "including a slut's fart, a fart made while sleeping, and someone who is between a slut and a tart." In October 2008, the court granted a preliminary injunction in Minsky's favor. On October 10, Linden Lab sought to terminate Minsky's Second Life account. On January 22, 2009. the case was settled out of court and the trademark filing was cancelled on April 7, 2009.
