= 28th Pennsylvania Infantry Regiment =

Union Army infantry regiment

28th Pennsylvania Volunteer Infantry
- Active: June 28, 1861 – July 18, 1865
- Country: United States of America
- Allegiance: Union
- Branch: Infantry
- Engagements: American Civil War: Second Battle of Bull Run; Battle of Antietam; Battle of Chancellorsville; Battle of Gettysburg; Battle of Lookout Mountain; Battle of Missionary Ridge; Battle of Ringgold Gap; Atlanta campaign; Battle of Davis's Cross Roads; Battle of Resaca; Battle of Dallas; Battle of New Hope Church; Battle of Allatoona; Battle of Gilgal Church; Battle of Kennesaw Mountain; Battle of Peachtree Creek; Sherman's March to the Sea; Carolinas campaign; Battle of Bentonville

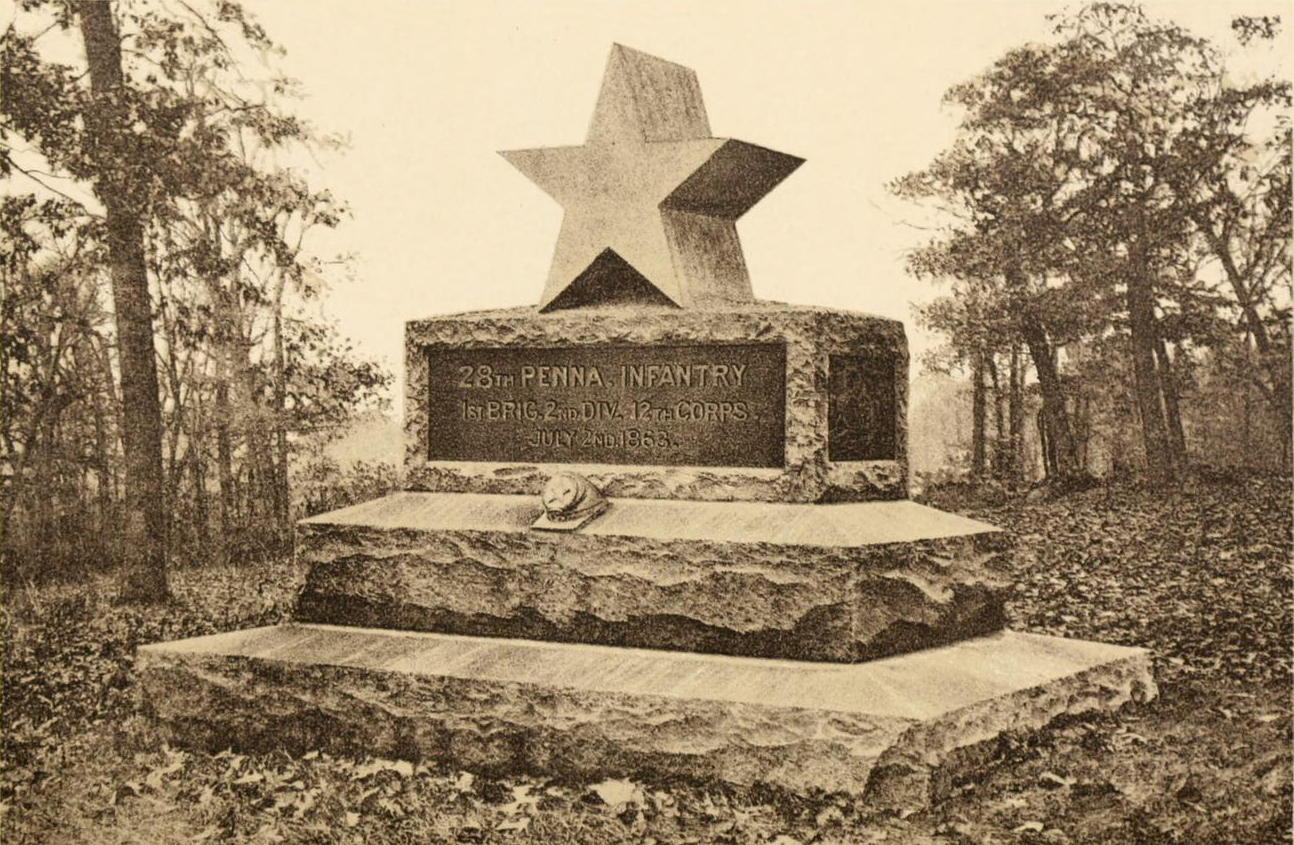
28th Pennsylvania Infantry Monument, Gettysburg Battlefield

The 28th Pennsylvania Volunteer Infantry (a.k.a. Goldstream Regiment) was an infantry regiment that served in the Union Army during the American Civil War. It was noted for its holding the high ground at the center of the line at Antietam as part of Tyndale's 1st Brigade, Greene's 2nd Division of Mansfield's XII Corps.

== Service ==
The 28th Pennsylvania Infantry was organized in Philadelphia, Pennsylvania for a three-year enlistment and mustered on June 28, 1861, under the command of Colonel John W. Geary. (Unusually, the regiment initially contained fifteen companies.)

The regiment was attached to George H. Thomas' Brigade, Department of the Shenandoah, to August 1861. 1st Brigade, Banks' Division, Department of the Shenandoah, to October 1861. Geary's Independent Brigade, Banks' Division, Army of the Potomac, to March 1862. 1st Brigade, 1st Division, Banks' V Corps, to April 1862. Geary's Independent Brigade, Department of the Shenandoah, to June 1862. 2nd Brigade, 1st Division, II Corps, Army of Virginia, to August 1862. 1st Brigade, 2nd Division, II Corps, Army of Virginia, to September 1862. 1st Brigade, 2nd Division, XII Corps, Army of the Potomac, to October 1863, and Army of the Cumberland, to April 1864. 1st Brigade, 2nd Division, XX Corps, Army of the Cumberland, to June 1865. 3rd Brigade, Bartlett's Division, XXII Corps, Department of Washington, to July 1865.

The 28th Pennsylvania Infantry mustered out July 18, 1865.

== Detailed service ==
Moved to Baltimore, Md., and Harpers Ferry, Va., July 27. Duty at Sandy Hook, opposite Harpers Ferry, until August 13, 1861. Moved to Point of Rocks, Md., and guard frontier from Nolan's Ferry to Antietam Aqueduct. Pritchard's Mills, Va., September 15 (Companies B, D, & I). Point of Rocks September 24. Knoxville October 2. Bolivar Heights October 16 (Companies A, D, F, & G). Nolan's Ferry October 30. Berlin November 10. Point of Rocks December 19. Crossed Potomac February 24–25. Operations in Loudon County, Va., February 25 – May 6. Occupation of Bolivar Heights February 26. Lovettsville March 1. Wheatland March 7. Occupation of Leesburg March 8. Upperville March 14. Ashby's Gap March 15. Capture of Rectortown, Piedmont, Markham, Linden, and Front Royal March 15–20. Operations about Middleburg and White Plains March 27–28. Thoroughfare Gap April 2. Warrenton April 6. Near Piedmont April 14. Linden May 15 (Company O). Reconnaissance from Front Royal to Browntown May 24. Guard railroad from White Plains to Manassas until May 24, and railroad and gaps of the Blue Ridge until June 23. Joined Banks at Middletown June 29. Reconnaissance to Thoroughfare Mountain August 9. Pope's Campaign in northern Virginia August 16 – September 2. White Sulphur Springs August 24. Second Battle of Bull Run August 30. Maryland Campaign September 6–24. Battle of Antietam September 16–17. Duty at Bolivar Heights until December. Reconnaissance to Lovettsville October 21. Companies L, M, N, and O transferred to 147th Pennsylvania Infantry October 28. Reconnaissance to Ripon, Va., November 9. Reconnaissance to Winchester December 2–6. Moved to Fredericksburg, Va., December 10–14. At Stafford Court House until April 27, 1863. "Mud March" January 20–24, 1863. Chancellorsville Campaign April 27 – May 6. Old Wilderness Tavern April 30. Battle of Chancellorsville May 1–5. Gettysburg Campaign June 11 – July 24. Battle of Gettysburg July 1–3. Fair Play, Md., July 13. Duty on line of the Rapidan until September. Movement to Bridgeport, Ala., September 24 – October 3. Reopening Tennessee River October 26–29. Battle of Wauhatchie, Tenn., October 28–29. Chattanooga-Ringgold Campaign November 23–27. Battle of Lookout Mountain November 23–24. Battle of Missionary Ridge November 25. Ringgold Gap, Taylor's Ridge November 27. Guard duty on the Nashville & Chattanooga Railroad until April 1864. Regiment reenlisted December 24, 1863. Veterans on furlough January and February 1864. Expedition down the Tennessee River to Triana April 12–16. Atlanta Campaign May 1 – September 8. Demonstration on Rocky Faced Ridge and Dalton May 5–13. Dug Gap, or Mill Springs, May 8. Battle of Resaca May 14–15. Near Cassville May 19. Advance on Dallas May 22–25. New Hope Church May 25. Operations on line of Pumpkin Vine Creek and battles about Dallas, New Hope Church, and Allatoona Hills, May 25 – June 5. Operations about Marietta and against Kennesaw Mountain June 10 – July 2. Pine Hill June 11–14. Lost Mountain June 15–17. Gilgal, or Golgotha Church, June 15. Muddy Creek June 17. Noyes Creek June 19. Kolb's Farm June 22. Assault on Kennesaw June 27. Ruff's Station or Smyrna Camp Ground July 4. Chattahoochie River July 5–17. Peach Tree Creek July 19–20. Siege of Atlanta July 22 – August 25. Operations at Chattahoochie River Bridge August 26 – September 2. Occupation of Atlanta September 2 – November 15. Whitehall Road, near Atlanta, November 9. March to the sea November 15 – December 10. Siege of Savannah December 10–21. Carolinas Campaign January to April 1865. North Edisto, S.C., February 12–13. Red Bank Creek February 15. Congaree Creek February 15. Averysboro, N.C., March 16. Battle of Bentonville March 19–21. Occupation of Goldsboro March 24. Advance on Raleigh April 9–13. Occupation of Raleigh April 14. Bennett's House April 26. Surrender of Johnston and his army. March to Washington, D.C., via Richmond, Va., April 29 – May 20. Grand Review of the Armies May 24. Duty in the Department of Washington until July.

== Casualties ==
The regiment lost a total of 284 men during service; 6 officers and 151 enlisted men killed or mortally wounded, 3 officers and 124 enlisted men died of disease.

== Commanders ==
- Colonel John W. Geary – promoted to brigadier general April 25, 1862
- Colonel Gabriel De Korponay – discharged due to illness March 26, 1863
- Colonel Thomas J. Ahl – resigned March 18, 1864
- Colonel John H. Flynn – commanded at the Battle of Gettysburg while still at the rank of captain
- Lieutenant Colonel James Fitzpatrick – commanded during the Carolinas Campaign
- Major Ario Pardee, Jr. – commanded at the Battle of Antietam
- Major Lansford F. Chapman – commanded at the Battle of Chancellorsville, where he was killed in action
- Captain Conrad U. Meyer – commanded at the Battle of Chancellorsville after Maj. Chapman was killed in action

== See also ==
- List of Pennsylvania Civil War Units
- Pennsylvania in the Civil War
