= Milnesville, Pennsylvania =

Unincorporated community in Pennsylvania, US

- Unincorporated community
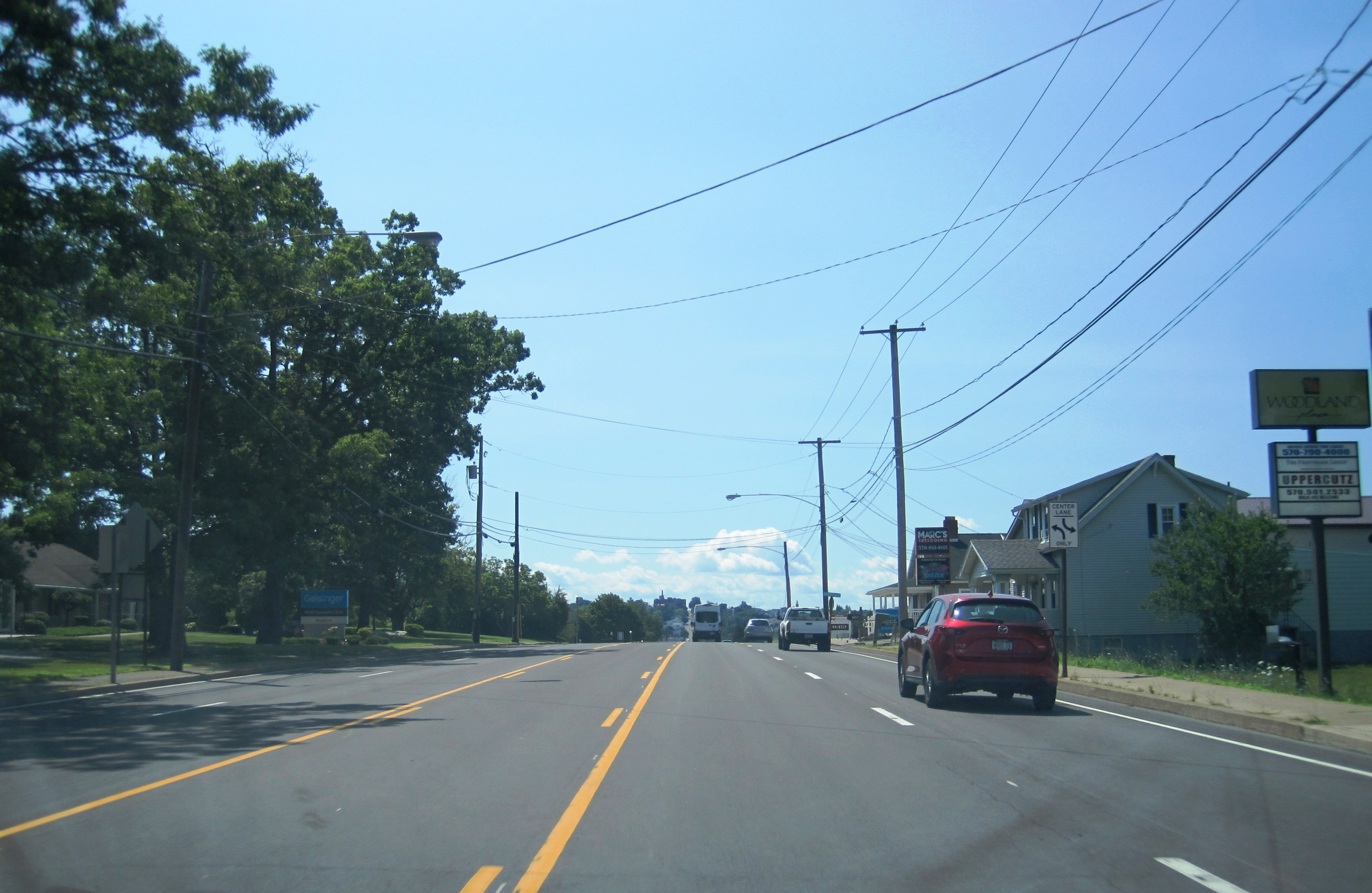
- Along PA 309 southbound

- Location within Pennsylvania Location within the United States
- Coordinates: 40°59′25″N 75°58′58″W
- Country: United States
- State: Pennsylvania
- County: Luzerne
- Township: Hazle
- Elevation: 1,608 ft (490 m)
- Time zone: UTC-5 (Eastern (EST))
  - Summer (DST): UTC-4 (EDT)
- ZIP code: 18239
- Area codes: 570 and 272
- GNIS feature ID: 1181295

Milnesville is an unincorporated community located in Hazle Township in Luzerne County, Pennsylvania. Milnesville is located along Pennsylvania Route 309, a short distance south of the Airport Beltway intersection to the north of Hazleton.
