= Hazle Township, Pennsylvania =

Township in Pennsylvania, US

Coordinates: 40°57′30″N 75°54′59″W

- Township
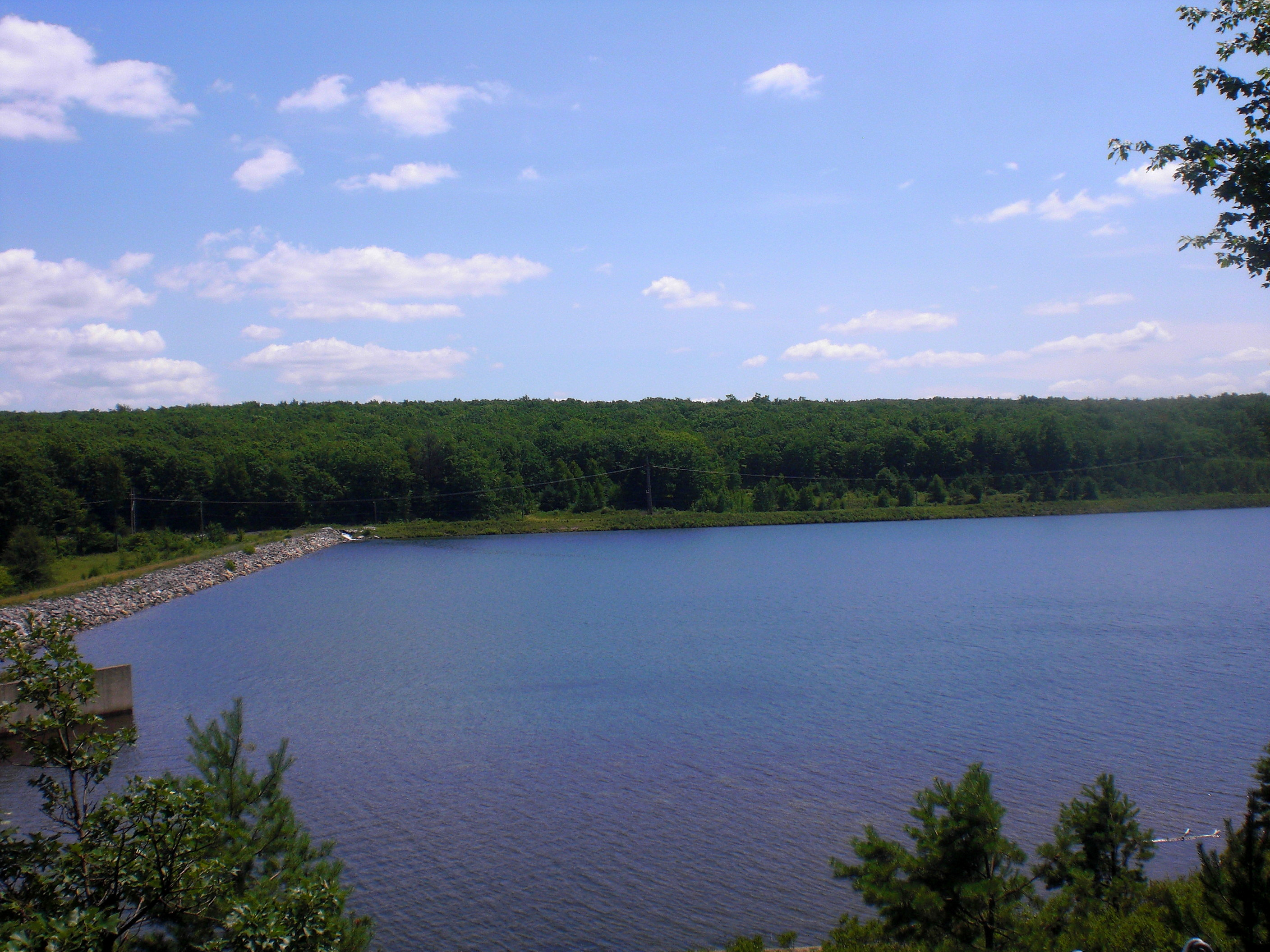
- Dreck Creek Reservoir in Hazle Township

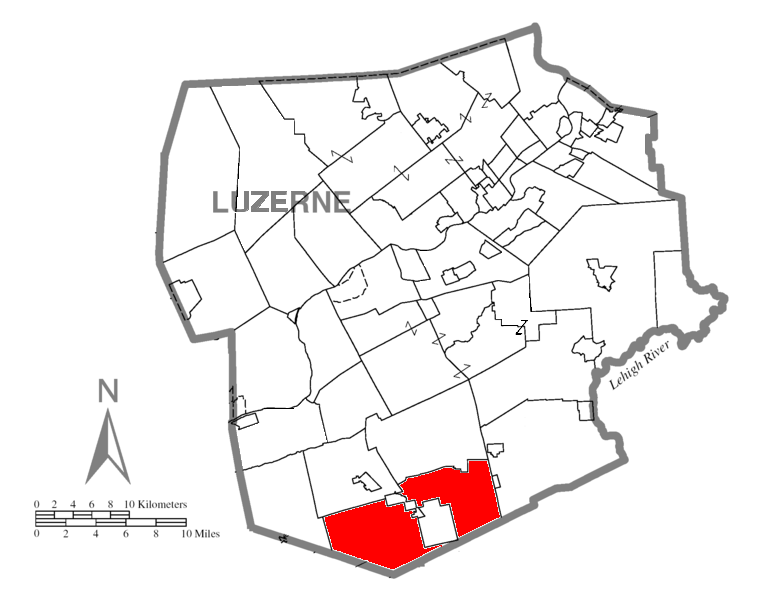
- Location of Hazle Township in Luzerne County, Pennsylvania

- Location of Luzerne County in Pennsylvania
- Country: United States
- State: Pennsylvania
- County: Luzerne
- Incorporated: 1839

Area
  - Total: 45.34 sq mi (117.42 km^{2})
  - Land: 45.07 sq mi (116.73 km^{2})
  - Water: 0.27 sq mi (0.69 km^{2})

Population (2020)
  - Total: 10,150 ▲
  - Estimate (2021): 10,170
  - Density: 211.2/sq mi (81.53/km^{2})
- Time zone: UTC-5 (Eastern (EST))
  - Summer (DST): UTC-4 (EDT)
- Area code: 570
- FIPS code: 42-079-33376
- Website: www.hazletownship.com

Hazle Township is a township in Luzerne County, Pennsylvania, United States. The population was 10,150 at the time of the 2020 census. The township surrounds the city of Hazleton and the borough of West Hazleton.

== History ==
=== Establishment ===
Delaware and Seneca tribes traveled through what is now southern Luzerne County to trade with other Native American settlements in New York and the Chesapeake Bay area. The most common route for the Native Americans was known as "Warriors Path", which was also used by white settlers in the 18th century. Broad Street (PA 93) is roughly the location of the trail.

Moravian missionaries were among the first Europeans to travel to the region; they wanted to convert Native Americans to Christianity. The Hazleton area was then a shallow valley with an abundance of hazel trees. It is speculated that the Native Americans were the first to refer to the area as "Hazle Swamp."

=== Coal mining ===
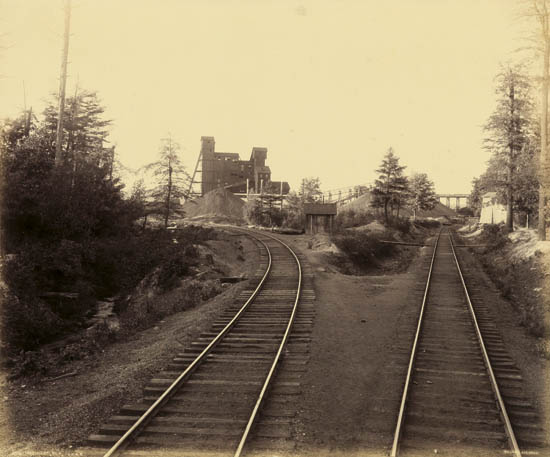
The Lattimer Colliery in 1890

At the beginning of the 19th century, Native Americans abandoned their territory in the east while European settlers continued to move into the region.

In 1804, a private company widened "Warriors Path", which was renamed the Berwick Turnpike. As a result, logging became the major industry in the area. Logging remained the largest industry in southern Luzerne County until the 1830s, when anthracite coal was discovered under the land that had been cleared. In 1836, the first mines and settlements were established in present-day Hazle Township.

Hazle Township was formed from a section of Sugarloaf Township in 1839; in 1856, a portion of Butler Township was added to Hazle Township. By the mid-19th century, the territory had changed dramatically from its early days. The expanding coal industry led to more extensive roads, railroads, and housing settlements. Immigrants, mostly from Europe, came to Greater Hazleton by the thousands to work in the dangerous mines. For the next century, large amounts of coal from Hazle Township were shipped by train to the lucrative Philadelphia market.

==== Lattimer Massacre ====
Mine workers began their protest march near Harwood; 19 were later killed by the Luzerne County sheriff in the Lattimer massacre.

On September 10, 1897, about 300 to 400 unarmed strikers, nearly all of Slovaks and Germans, marched to a coal mine owned by Calvin Pardee (in the town of Lattimer in Hazle Township) to support a newly formed UMW union. The demonstrators were confronted by law enforcement officials several times on the road; they were ordered to disperse, but kept marching.

The deputies had spent most of the morning joking about how many miners they would kill. While on a streetcar headed for Lattimer (with the sheriff and his comrades), one deputy was overheard saying "I bet I drop six of them when I get over there."

When the demonstrators reached Lattimer at 3:45 pm, they were met again by the sheriff and 150 armed deputies. Sources differ on the number of deputies present. One source claims only 86 deputies confronted the marchers. Sheriff Martin ordered the marchers to disperse, and then attempted to grab an American flag out of the hands of the lead marcher. A scuffle ensued, and the police opened fire on the unarmed crowd. Nineteen miners died, and anywhere from 17 to 49 others wounded. All had been shot in the back, and several had multiple gunshot wounds which indicated that they had been targeted by the deputies.

=== 20th century ===
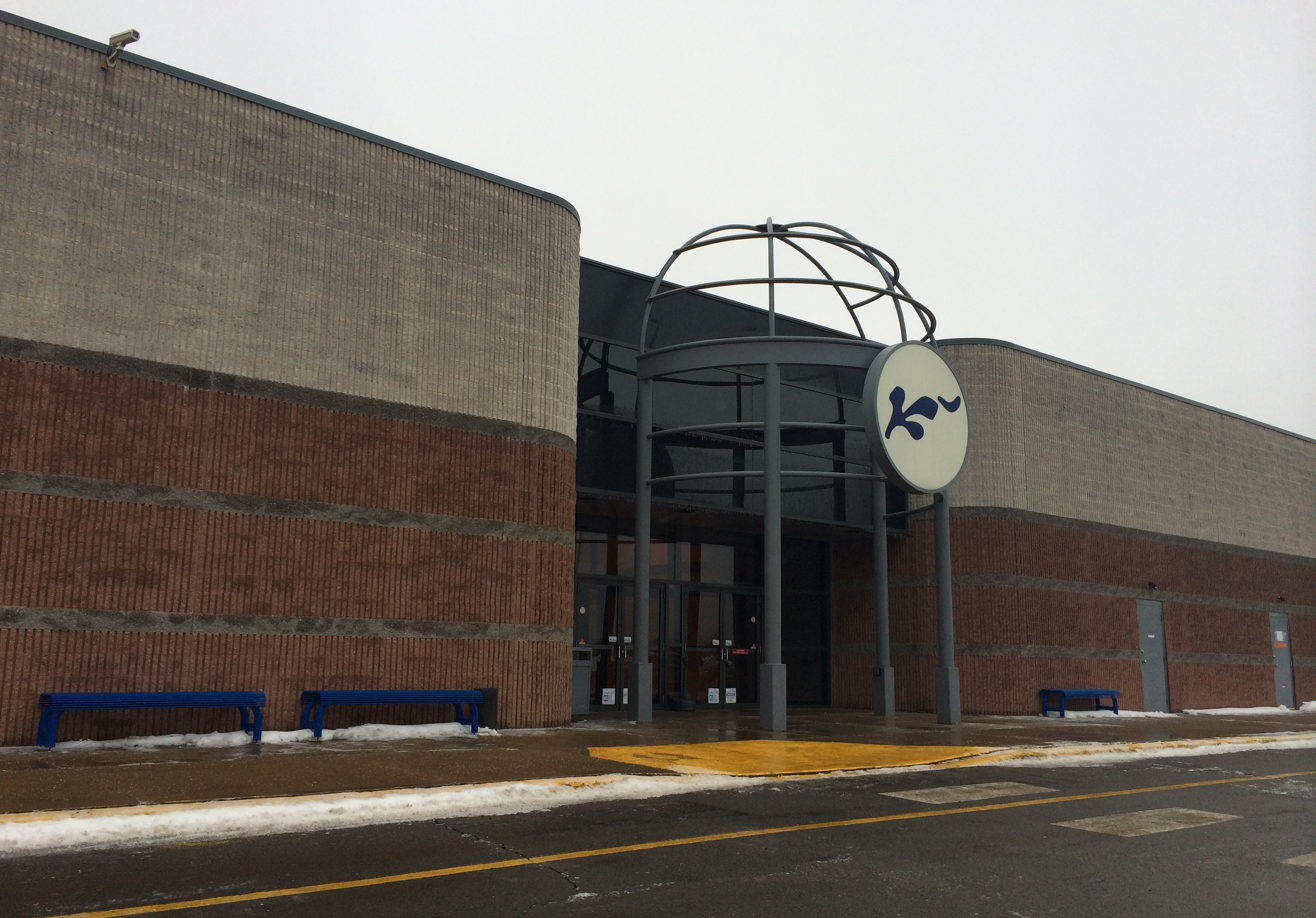
Laurel Mall in Hazle Township

The population of Hazle Township peaked at nearly 15,000 residents in the early 20th century. By the 1940s, the population began to dwindle; this was the result of the declining coal industry. Many mines closed in the 1940s and 1950s. Many residents were forced to seek jobs elsewhere.

Although the region was in the midst of an economic recession, local leaders were determined to turn the economy around. CAN-DO (Community Area New Development Organization) was formally organized in 1956 by founder Dr. Edgar L. Dessen. It was founded to bring new industry into the area. Their first priority was to raise money—through their "Dime a Week" campaign—in which area residents were encouraged to put a dime on their sidewalk each week to be collected by CAN-DO.

The company raised over $250,000 and was able to purchase over 500 acres (2.0 km2) of land, which was converted into an industrial park. CAN-DO was responsible for establishing the Valmont, Humboldt, and McAdoo industrial parks. CAN-DO also founded a white-collar business park in the late 1990s; it was named the CAN-DO Corporate Center, located in nearby Drums. Today, retail development and housing construction are on the rise in Hazle Township.

== Geography ==
According to the United States Census Bureau, the township has a total area of 45.3 square miles (117.4 km^{2}), of which 45.1 square miles (116.7 km^{2}) is land and 0.27 square miles (0.7 km^{2}), or 0.59%, is water. It is drained by the Susquehanna River and the Lehigh River. Hazle Township is located in the southern portion of Luzerne County; it surrounds most of Hazleton and West Hazleton. Its numbered routes include I-81, PA 93, PA 309, PA 424, PA 924, and PA 940. Hazleton Regional Airport is situated in the northern half of the township. Most of the community is made up of homes and businesses. Mountains, forests, creeks, lakes, and strip mines are also scattered throughout the township. Its villages include Beaver Brook, Drifton, Ebervale, Green Ridge, Harleigh, Harwood, Hollywood, Humboldt, Japan, Jeanesville, Lattimer, Milnesville, Oakdale, Pardeesville, and Stockton.

The township has a warm-summer humid continental climate (Dfb) and the hardiness zone is 6a. Average monthly temperatures in Humboldt range from 23.7 °F in January to 70.2 °F in July, while in Oakdale they range from 23.8 °F in January to 69.5 °F in July.

=== Neighboring municipalities ===
- Black Creek Township (west)
- Sugarloaf Township (north)
- West Hazleton (surrounds)
- Hazleton (surrounds)
- Butler Township (north)
- Foster Township (east)
- Jeddo (east)
- Banks Township, Carbon County (south)
- Kline Township, Schuylkill County (south)
- East Union Township, Schuylkill County (southwest)

== Demographics ==
Historical population
Census	Pop.	Note	%±
2000	9,000		—
2010	9,549		6.1%
2020	10,150		6.3%
2021 (est.)	10,170		0.2%

As of the census of 2000, there were 9,000 people, 3,775 households, and 2,536 families residing in the township. The population density was 200.3 inhabitants per square mile (77.3/km^{2}). There were 4,002 housing units at an average density of 89.1 per square mile (34.4/km^{2}). The racial makeup of the township was 98.67% White, 0.17% African American, 0.06% Native American, 0.31% Asian, 0.42% from other races, and 0.38% from two or more races. Hispanic or Latino of any race were 1.02% of the population.

There were 3,775 households, out of which 25.3% had children under the age of 18 living with them, 51.2% were married couples living together, 11.3% had a female householder with no husband present, and 32.8% were non-families. 29.8% of all households were made up of individuals, and 16.7% had someone living alone who was 65 years of age or older. The average household size was 2.32 and the average family size was 2.86.

In the township the population is fairly spread out, with 19.4% under the age of 18, 6.7% from 18 to 24, 24.6% from 25 to 44, 26.3% from 45 to 64, and 23.0% who were 65 years of age or older. The median age was 44 years. For every 100 females, there were 90.2 males. For every 100 females age 18 and over, there were 85.3 males.

The median income for a household in the township was $34,352, and the median income for a family was $44,028. Males had a median income of $32,993 versus $22,926 for females. The per capita income for the township was $18,139. About 9.3% of families and 11.5% of the population were below the poverty line, including 14.1% of those under age 18 and 12.6% of those age 65 or over.

== Government ==
Hazle Township is governed by three supervisors; each one is elected at-large.

- Jim Montone, chairman
- Dennis Dudeck, vice chairman
- Francis Boyarski

== Education ==
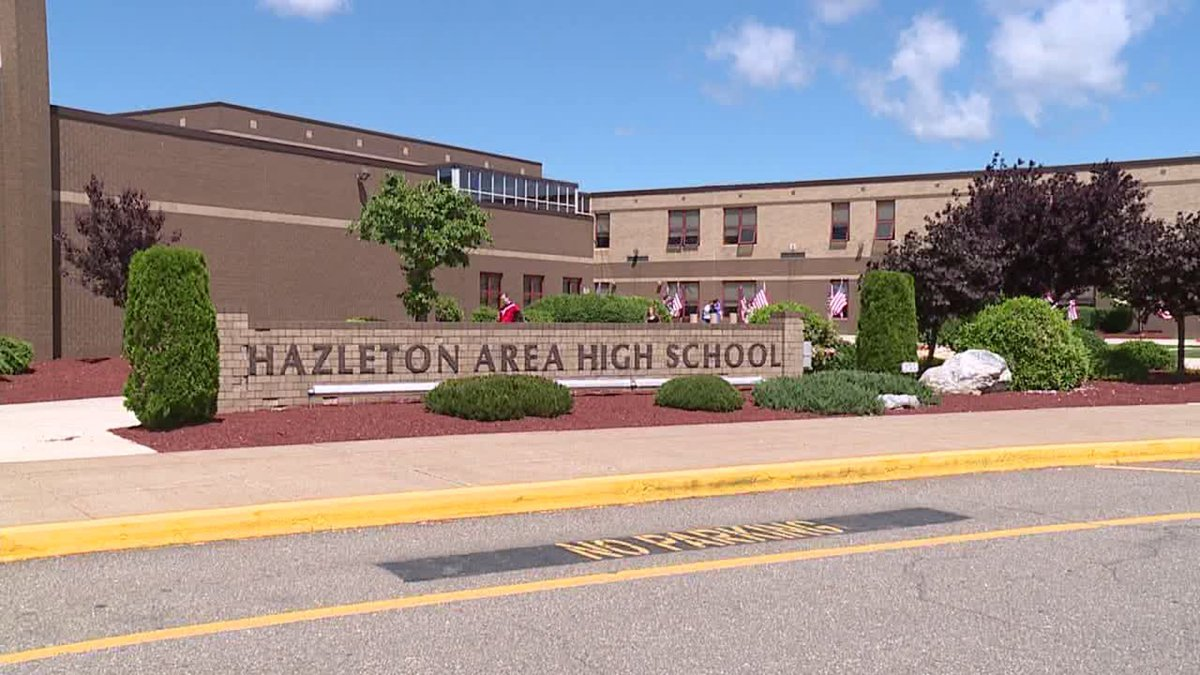
Hazleton Area High School in Hazle Township, June 2018

Hazle Township is part of Hazleton Area School District. The school district encompasses approximately 250 square miles (650 km^{2}). According to 2000 federal census data, it served a resident population of 70,042. By 2010, the district's population increased to 72,862 people. The school district's administrative headquarters is located in Hazle Township. The following schools are located in or near Hazle Township:

- Hazleton Area High School
- Maple Manor Elementary/Middle School
- Hazleton Area Career Center
- Hazle Township Early Learning Center

=== Colleges and universities ===
- Penn State Hazleton
- McCann School of Business & Technology

== Notable people ==
- Eckley Brinton Coxe (1839–1895), coal baron and Pennsylvania state senator
- Jack Palance (1919–2006), actor
