= 147th Pennsylvania Infantry Regiment =

Union Army infantry regiment

147th Pennsylvania Volunteer Infantry
- Active: September 29, 1862 – July 15, 1865
- Country: United States of America
- Allegiance: Union
- Branch: Infantry
- Engagements: Battle of Chancellorsville; Battle of Gettysburg; Battle of Lookout Mountain; Battle of Missionary Ridge; Atlanta campaign Battle of Resaca; Battle of Dallas; Battle of New Hope Church; Battle of Allatoona; Battle of Marietta; Battle of Kennesaw Mountain; Battle of Peachtree Creek; Siege of Atlanta; Sherman's March to the Sea; Carolinas campaign Battle of Bentonville

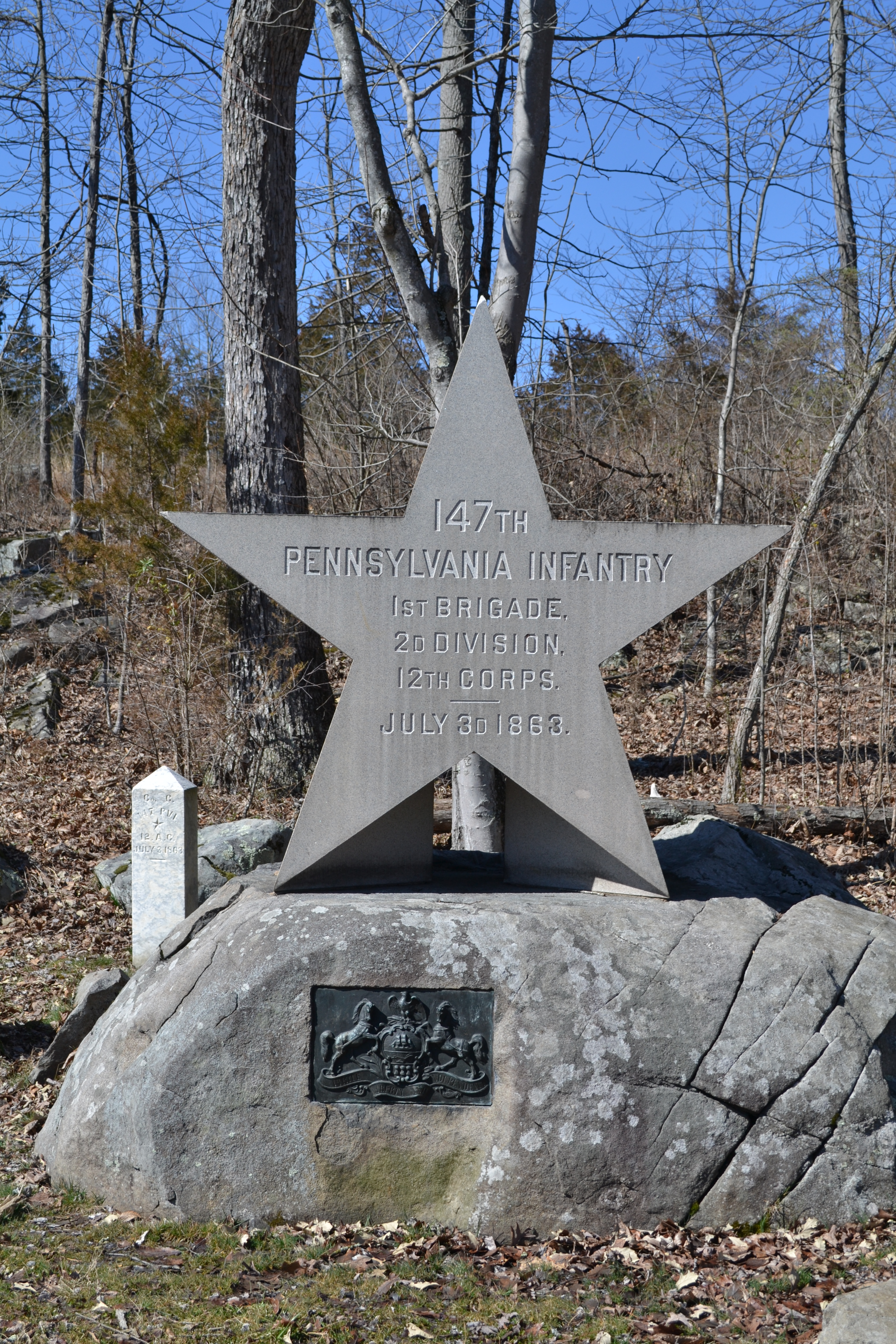
Monument to the 147th Pennsylvania Infantry at Gettysburg

The 147th Pennsylvania Volunteer Infantry was an infantry regiment that served in the Union Army during the American Civil War.

== Service ==
The 147th Pennsylvania Infantry was organized at Loudoun Heights, Virginia from surplus companies of the 28th Pennsylvania Infantry and mustered in as Companies A, B, C, D, and E for a three-year enlistment on October 10, 1862 under the command of Colonel Ario Pardee Jr. Companies F, G, and H were organized at Harrisburg, Pennsylvania September 29 through November 20, 1862. Company I was organized at Philadelphia on October 10, 1862. Company K was organized in October 1864 from men in Companies A through E who chose not to reenlist.

The regiment was attached to 1st Brigade, 2nd Division, XII Corps, Army of the Potomac, to October 1863, and Army of the Cumberland to April 1864. 1st Brigade, 2nd Division, XX Corps, Army of the Cumberland, to July 1865. Duty in the Department of Washington until July.

The 147th Pennsylvania Infantry mustered out of service on July 15, 1865. Companies F and G mustered out on June 6, 1865.

== Detailed service ==
Duty at Bolivar Heights, Va., until December 1862. Reconnaissance to Rippon, Va., November 9, and to Winchester, Va., December 2–6. Moved to Fredericksburg December 10–14. At Stafford Court House until April 27, 1863. Burnside's 2nd Campaign, "Mud March," January 20–24. Chancellorsville Campaign April 27-May 6. Battle of Chancellorsville May 1–5. Gettysburg Campaign June 11-July 24. Battle of Gettysburg July 1–3. Pursuit of Lee July 524. Movement to Bridgeport, Ala., September 24-October 3. Reopening Tennessee River October 26–29. Wauhatchie, Tenn., October 28–29. Chattanooga Ringgold Campaign November 23–27. Battles of Lookout Mountain November 23–24 and Missionary Ridge November 25. Ringgold Gap, Taylor's Ridge, November 27. Guard duty on Nashville & Chattanooga Railroad until April 1864. Expedition down the Tennessee River to Triana, Ala., April 12–16. Atlanta Campaign May 1-September 8. Demonstration on Rocky Faced Ridge May 8–11. Dug Gap or Mill Creek May 8. Battle of Resaca May 14–15. Near Cassville May 19. New Hope Church May 25. Operations on line of Pumpkin Vine Creek and battles about Dallas, New Hope Church, and Allatoona Hills May 26-June 5. Operations about Marietta and against Kennesaw Mountain June 10-July 2. Pine Hill June 11–14. Lost Mountain June 15–17. Gilgal or Golgotha Church June 15. Muddy Creek June 17. Noyes Creek June 19. Kolb's Farm June 22. Assault on Kennesaw June 27. Ruff's Station, Smyrna Camp Ground, July 4. Chattahoochie River July 6–17. Peachtree Creek July 19–20. Siege of Atlanta July 22-August 25. Operations at Chattahoochie River Bridge August 26-September 2. Occupation of Atlanta September 2-November 15. Near Atlanta November 9. March to the sea November 15-December 10. Siege of Savannah December 10–21. Carolinas Campaign January to April 1865. North Edisto River, S.C., February 12–13. Red Bank and Congaree Creek February 15 Averysboro, N.C., March 16. Battle of Bentonville March 19–21. Occupation of Goldsboro March 24. Advance on Raleigh, N.C., April 9–13. Occupation of Raleigh April 14. Bennett's House April 26. Surrender of Johnston and his army. March to Washington, D.C., via Richmond, Va., April 29-May 20. Grand Review of the Armies May 24.

== Casualties ==
The regiment lost a total of 142 men during service; 7 officers and 71 enlisted men killed or mortally wounded, 3 officers and 61 enlisted men died of disease.

== Commanders ==
- Colonel Ario Pardee Jr.

== Notable members ==
- Captain William E. Goodman, Company D - Medal of Honor recipient for action at the Battle of Chancellorsville

== See also ==
- List of Pennsylvania Civil War Units
- Pennsylvania in the Civil War
