= Ebervale, Pennsylvania =

Unincorporated community in Pennsylvania, US

- Unincorporated community
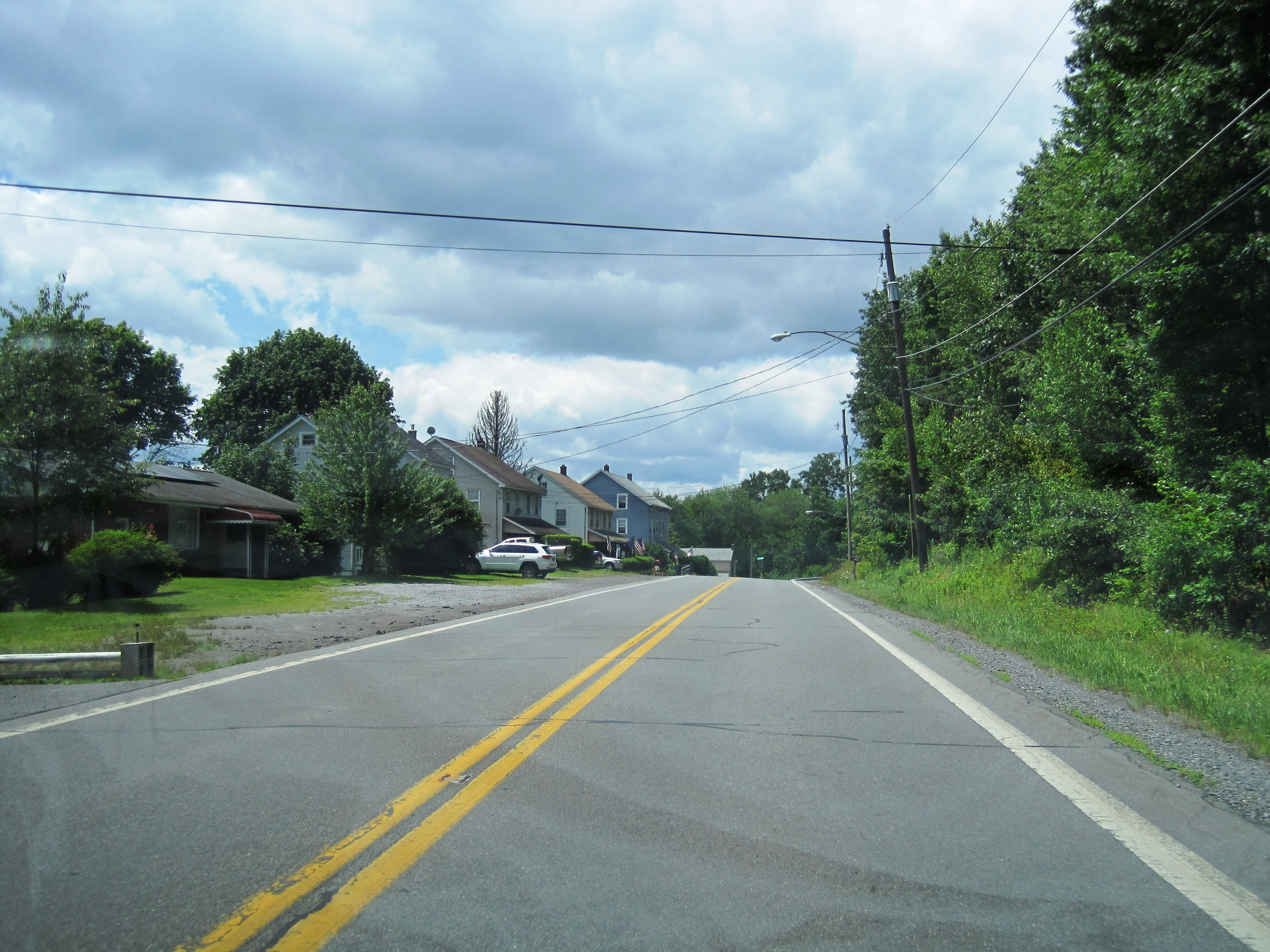
- Looking west along PA 940

- Location within Pennsylvania Location within the United States
- Coordinates: 40°59′10″N 75°56′29″W
- Country: United States
- State: Pennsylvania
- County: Luzerne
- Township: Hazle
- Elevation: 1,542 ft (470 m)
- Time zone: UTC-5 (Eastern (EST))
  - Summer (DST): UTC-4 (EDT)
- ZIP code: 18223
- Area codes: 570 and 272
- GNIS feature ID: 1173962

Ebervale is an unincorporated community located in Hazle Township in Luzerne County, Pennsylvania. Ebervale is located along Pennsylvania Route 940, northeast of Hazleton and west of Jeddo. The village takes its name from an Anglicization of the place name Ebbw Vale, a town in Wales.
