= Gravel Run (Black Creek tributary) =

Physical characteristics
- Source
  - location: Hazle Township, Luzerne County, Pennsylvania
  - elevation: between 1,560 and 1,580 feet (480 and 480 m)
- Mouth
  - location: Black Creek in Hazle Township, Luzerne County, Pennsylvania
  - coordinates: 40°58′28″N 75°59′53″W
  - elevation: 1,467 ft (447 m)
- Length: 0.5 mi (0.80 km)

Basin features
- Progression: Black Creek → Nescopeck Creek → Susquehanna River → Chesapeake Bay

Gravel Run is a tributary of Black Creek in Luzerne County, Pennsylvania, in the United States. It is approximately 0.5 miles (0.80 km) long and flows through Hazle Township. The stream drains part of the city of Hazleton. In the early 1900s, it was polluted by acid mine drainage. A borehole was dug near the mouth of the stream in the late 1800s.

== Course ==
Gravel Run begins in Hazle Township, very near the city of Hazleton. It flows northwest for a few tenths of a mile before turning north. Over the next few tenths of a mile, the stream passes near the Hazleton Area High School and flows down a small hill. A short distance further downstream, it reaches its confluence with Black Creek.

== Hydrology, geography and geology ==
The elevation near the mouth of Gravel Run is 1,467 feet (447 m) above sea level. The elevation of the stream's source is between 1,560 and 1,580 feet (480 and 480 m) above sea level.

A report by the Pennsylvania Department of Health in the early 1900s described Gravel Run as being a small stream. It was described as being 1 mile (1.6 km) long in the early 1900s.

A diamond drill borehole dug in the late 1800s at the mouth of Gravel Run revealed 15 different strata within roughly 100 feet (30 m) of the surface. The top 30 feet (9.1 m) consisted of surface wash and dark slate. The next 18 feet (5.5 m) contained coal with slate, soft gray sandy shale, pulverized rock and sand, gray shale and graphite, pulverized rock and coal, brown sandy clay and pulverized rock, light red and yellow-brown shale, and fine gray sandstone, in that order. The next 38 feet (12 m) consisted of dark gray sandstone and coarse gray sandstone with pebbles, in that order. The final 21 feet (6.4 m) contained gray sandstone, gray sandstone with pebbles, and gray sandstone with coal slate, in that order. Overall, the borehole revealed 38 different strata.

Gravel Run, like many streams in its vicinity, was polluted by acid mine drainage in the early 1900s. The acid mine drainage came from mines in and near the city of Hazleton.

== Watershed ==
Gravel Run is entirely within the United States Geological Survey quadrangle of Hazleton. It drains a portion of the northwestern part of the city of Hazleton. It drains the older part of the city as well as the Green Ridge Territory.

Gravel Run is one of eleven officially named streams in the watershed of Nescopeck Creek that has not been assessed by the Pennsylvania Fish and Boat Commission.

== History ==
Gravel Run was entered into the Geographic Names Information System on January 1, 1990. Its identifier in the Geographic Names Information System is 1202232. The stream appears in the Atlas of the Anthracite Coalfields of Pennsylvania, which was published in 1888.

Historically, the Pennsylvania Railroad owned a tract of land in the vicinity of Gravel Run. A diamond drill borehole was once dug on this property near the mouth of the stream. The sewers of Hazleton historically discharged into Black Creek via Gravel Run. In the early 1900s, there was a well near the headwaters of Gravel Run.

== See also ==
- Stony Creek (Black Creek), next tributary of Black Creek going downstream
- Little Black Creek, next tributary of Black Creek going upstream
- List of rivers of Pennsylvania
