= William E. Goodman =

William Ernest Goodman
- Born: December 10, 1838; Philadelphia, Pennsylvania, US
- Died: April 22, 1912 (aged 73); Pennsylvania, US
- Military career
- Allegiance: United States
- Branch: United States Army; Union Army
- Service years: 1861 - 1865
- Rank: Captain; Brevet Major
- Units: Company D, 147th Pennsylvania Infantry
- Conflicts: Battle of Chancellorsville; American Civil War
- Awards: Medal of Honor

William Ernest Goodman (December 10, 1838 – March 22, 1912) was an American soldier who fought in the American Civil War. Goodman received his country's highest award for bravery during combat, the Medal of Honor. Goodman's medal was won when he rescued the colors of the 107th Ohio Infantry from Confederate States Army forces during the Battle of Chancellorsville, in Virginia on March 3, 1863. He was honored with the award on January 11, 1894.

Goodman was born in Philadelphia. He was commissioned as an officer in September 1861, and mustered out with his regiment in July 1865.

== Medal of Honor citation ==
The President of the United States of America, in the name of Congress, takes pleasure in presenting the Medal of Honor to First Lieutenant (Infantry) William Ernest Goodman, United States Army, for extraordinary heroism on 3 May 1863, while serving with Company D, 147th Pennsylvania Infantry, in action at Chancellorsville, Virginia. First Lieutenant Goodman rescued the colors of the 107th Ohio Volunteers from the enemy.

== See also ==
- List of American Civil War Medal of Honor recipients: G–L
