= Ario Pardee Jr. =

Union Army officer in the American Civil War

Ariovistus Pardee Jr.
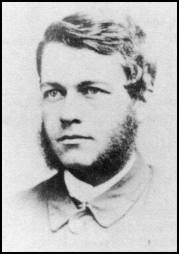
- Born: October 28, 1839; Hazleton, Pennsylvania, US
- Died: March 16, 1901 (aged 61); Wyncote, Pennsylvania, US
- Military career
- Allegiance: United States; Union
- Branch: United States Army; Union Army
- Service years: 1861 – 1865
- Rank: Colonel; Brevet Brigadier general
- Unit: 28th Pennsylvania Infantry
- Commands: 147th Pennsylvania Infantry; 1st Brigade, 1st Div., XX Corps
- Conflicts: American Civil War: Battle of Antietam; Battle of Chancellorsville; Battle of Gettysburg; Battle of Wauhatchie; Battle of Lookout Mountain; Battle of Ringgold Gap; Battle of Peachtree Creek; Battle of Bentonville

Ariovistus Pardee Jr. (October 28, 1839 – March 16, 1901) was an officer in the Union Army during the American Civil War. He rose to fame during the Battle of Gettysburg, where he led the defense of a portion of Culp's Hill on July 3, 1863. A monument on the Gettysburg Battlefield commemorates the spot as "Pardee Field."

== Early life ==
Ario (Ariovistus) Pardee Jr. was the eldest child of Ariovistus Pardee, a capitalist who founded Hazleton, Pennsylvania, and Elizabeth Jacobs. He was born in Hazleton on October 28, 1839. In 1847, his mother died in childbirth. The following year, his father married Anna Maria Robison, the family's governess. Pardee trained as a civil engineer at Rensselaer Polytechnic Institute. After graduating in 1858, he became involved in running his father’s anthracite coal mines. By the outbreak of the war, he was married to Mary Allison. Their only child was stillborn during the Civil War. Ario Pardee Jr. had no direct descendants.

== Civil War in the East ==
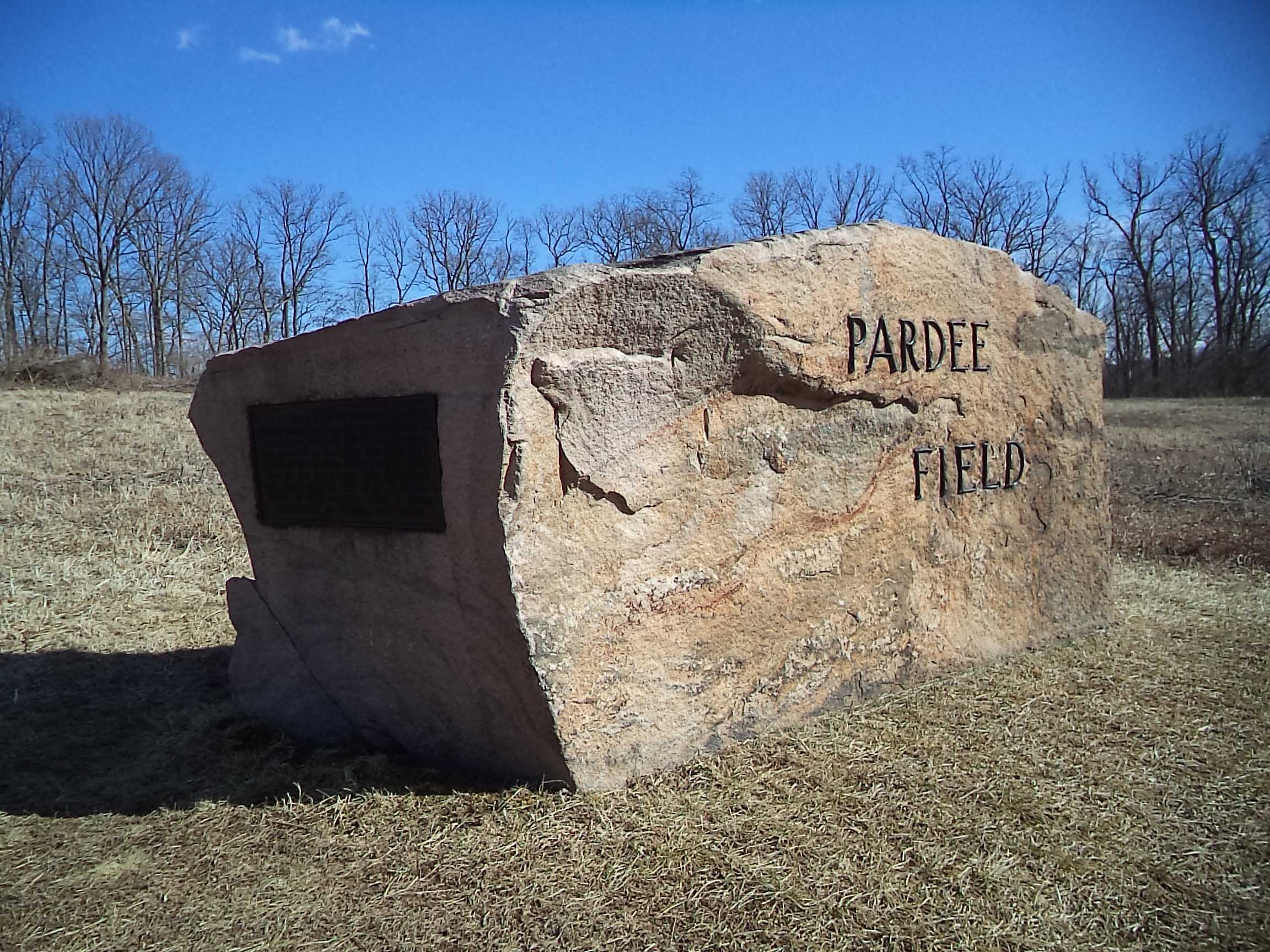
Pardee Field, at the Gettysburg Battlefield

Pardee joined the 28th Pennsylvania Infantry on June 28, 1861. It was encamped at Camp Coleman in Philadelphia, Pennsylvania in July while completing organization. After serving as captain of Company A, organized by his father, he was named major on November 1 of that year. (Col John W. Geary had been made a brigadier general, and Pardee was among those promoted in the follow-up to that promotion.) Pardee served under Geary in the Shenandoah Valley, when MG Nathaniel Banks was bested by Stonewall Jackson. Pardee criticized Geary's actions in that campaign, especially his abandoning Thoroughfare Gap in the face of a Confederate advance. Apparently, Pardee thought a force of 5,000 federals could withstand a force of 28,000 Confederates. His reasons for this opinion are unclear to this day. Pardee thought Geary overestimated dangers confronting him. (Geary's actions may have been the wiser, since both survived the war.) While serving under MG John Pope in Virginia, Pardee missed the Battle of Cedar Mountain; and Banks' command was not engaged at the Second Battle of Bull Run, being detailed to guard the rear of Pope's army. It only did some skirmishing after the battle had ended.

At the rank of major, Pardee led the regiment at the Battle of Antietam on September 17, 1862, serving in the brigade of Lt. Col. Hector Tyndale in Second Division of the XII Corps. Ario escaped uninjured, despite having a horse shot out from under him. BG George S. Greene, the division commander, commended Pardee for his conduct at Antietam. Pardee even took command of the brigade briefly, because Tyndale had been wounded. Shortly thereafter, on October 9 of that year, some companies of the 28th became part of the new 147th Pennsylvania Infantry, together with three newly recruited companies. Pardee was named lieutenant colonel and commander of the new regiment.

Pardee next saw combat in the Battle of Chancellorsville, where he led the regiment in the brigade of Col. Charles Candy in the Second Division of BG John White Geary, his former regimental commander. He retained command at the Battle of Gettysburg, during which he was engaged in the fighting on Culp's Hill on July 2, and July 3, 1863. A field on Culp’s Hill has been named for him, as a sign painted on a stone shows. The 147th Pennsylvania faced that field during the fighting on July 3, as XII Corps tried to win back ground lost to the Confederate troops of Lt. Gen. Richard S. Ewell on the day before. (Geary was ordered away by Gen Meade with two brigades on July 2, to assist in the battle on the left flank. Instead of going to reinforce the army's endangered left as intended, Geary mistakenly took Candy's command and Thomas L. Kane's brigade out of the battle for the rest of the day.) Their foes resumed the previous day's efforts to carry Culp’s Hill by attacking up hill. Pardee was told by Geary to maintain a steady volume of fire on the Confederates. This aided the repulse of the last attack of BG George H. Steuart's brigade across the field. The volume of fire, however, was such that ammunition became scarce. By 11:00 AM the Confederate attacks ended. The report of Col Charles Candy that Pardee's regiment advanced to the wall on the opposite side of the contested field is not supported by other accounts by credible witnesses.

== Civil War in the West ==
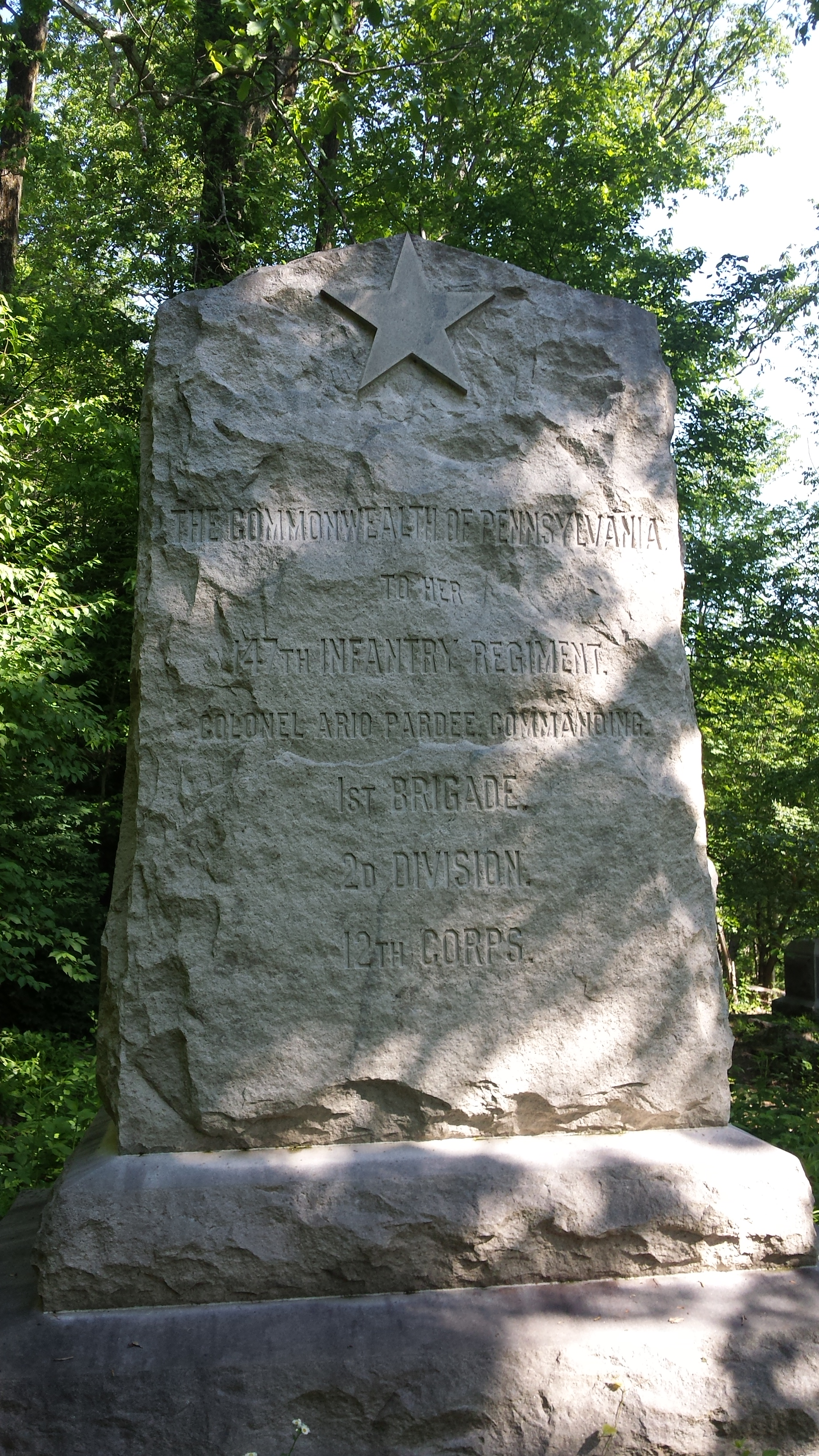
Monument on Lookout Mountain dedicated to the 12th Corps, which Pardee commanded.

Pardee went west with the rest of XII Corps and XI Corps, which had been sent to the relief of the Army of the Cumberland, besieged in Chattanooga, Tennessee by the Confederate Army of Tennessee. The regiment participated in the Battle of Wauhatchie, the Battle of Lookout Mountain and the Battle of Ringgold Gap while under the overall command of Maj. Gen. Joseph Hooker. Pardee, ordinarily a critic of Geary, praised his division commander's conduct at Wauhatchie.

Pardee was promoted to the rank of colonel on March 19, 1864. He then led the regiment in Col Candy's brigade in Brig. Gen. John W. Geary’s second division XX Corps in the Army of the Cumberland. This corps had been created out of XI Corps, XII Corps and some garrison troops. Hooker commanded the corps at the beginning of Maj. Gen. William T. Sherman’s Atlanta campaign. At the Battle of Peachtree Creek, Pardee's regiment held its ground against attacking Confederate forces while the regiments either side of it retreated. The 147th suffered heavy losses, and Pardee complained that his right flank was thrown into disorder by routed troops. Ario's cousin, Isaiah Platt, was also killed at this battle. They were in the same Infantry formation.

After Colonel Candy was mustered out of the service, Pardee usually led the first brigade of Geary’s Division in the later stages of the Atlanta Campaign, the March to the Sea and the Carolinas campaign. During that latter campaign, XX Corps became part of Maj. Gen. Henry Warner Slocum’s Army of Georgia. Pardee's last major battle as a brigade commander was the Battle of Bentonville in North Carolina.

Pardee received promotion to the brevet rank of brigadier general on January 12, 1865, for the Battle of Peachtree Creek. He was discharged from the service on June 13 of that year.

== Postbellum activities ==
After the Civil War, Pardee returned to Pennsylvania. There he went back into the coal business as a partner with his father and his brother Calvin. Ario Jr. was not heavily involved in the management of these enterprises. That fell to his father and then to brothers Calvin and Frank. Colonel Pardee's health seems to have been undermined by war service, which would explain his passive role. He also had interests in railroads and belonged to the Military Order of the Loyal Legion of the United States. Mary Pardee predeceased her husband, and he grew testy in old age. Ario Pardee Jr. died at Wyncote, Pennsylvania, on March 16, 1901.
