= Lattimer massacre =

1897 killing of unarmed striking miners

- Date: September 10, 1897
- Location: Lattimer, Pennsylvania, U.S. 40°59′41″N 75°57′38″W
- Goals: Wage increase
- Methods: Strikes, protest, demonstrations

Parties
| United Mine Workers | Sheriff's posse |

Lead figures
| Michael Cheslock | James F. Martin |

Number
| 300–400 | c. 100 |

Casualties and losses
| Deaths: at least 19; Injuries: dozens | Arrests: 74 |

The Lattimer massacre was the killing of at least 19 unarmed striking immigrant anthracite miners by a Luzerne County sheriff's posse at the Lattimer mine near Hazleton, Pennsylvania, United States, on September 10, 1897. The miners were mostly of Polish, Slovak, Lithuanian and German ethnicities. Scores more miners were wounded in the attack by the posse. The massacre was a turning point in the history of the United Mine Workers (UMW).

== Background ==
The economies of Central and Eastern Europe were struggling in the late 19th century. The European rural population was growing faster than either the agricultural or new industrial sectors of the economy could absorb, industrialization was disrupting both the agricultural and craft economy, and there was increasing competition from large-scale commercial and foreign agricultural producers. These were the factors that drove most of the mass immigration to the US, where the economy was booming and many industrial jobs were available requiring little English.

Large numbers of newly arrived Slavic immigrants worked in the anthracite coal industry in Northeastern Pennsylvania during the late 19th and early 20th centuries. Like many immigrant groups, they often took dangerous, low-paying jobs under harsh conditions and faced significant exploitation by mine operators. During periods of labor unrest, some mine owners recruited newly arrived immigrants to continue mine operations during strikes, which created tensions between ethnic groups already working in the mines. However, many Slavic immigrants were themselves vulnerable laborers seeking survival and opportunity, and over time they became active participants in labor unions and workers’ rights movements throughout the coal industry. Conditions in coal mines of the late 19th century were harsh. Mine safety was so poor that 32,000 miners in Northeast Pennsylvania had died since 1870. Wages, already low in a competitive industry, fell 17% during the mid-1890s after a coal industry slump.

Although wages had improved to some extent by the fall of 1897, anthracite coal companies in the region cut wages and consolidated operations within the mines, often worsening working conditions. In some cases, companies forced workers to lease homes from the company and required them to see only company doctors when injured.

The effects of the Lattimer Massacre were deeply felt throughout nearby anthracite coal communities including Freeland and Eckley, where generations of immigrant mining families — including Irish, Welsh, Slavic, Italian, and other ethnic groups — lived and worked under dangerous and exploitative conditions. Historians have noted that coal operators and local authorities often encouraged ethnic divisions among miners, despite the fact that many immigrant communities experienced similar discrimination and economic hardship. Over time, labor unrest and tragedies such as the Lattimer Massacre helped foster broader solidarity among workers across ethnic lines in the anthracite region.

Communities such as Freeland and Eckley were closely connected to the labor unrest surrounding the massacre. Irish immigrant miners in the region had themselves previously faced discrimination, poverty, and dangerous working conditions before later waves of Eastern and Southern European immigrants arrived. Scholars of anthracite labor history argue that mine owners frequently exploited ethnic tensions among workers in order to weaken labor organization and union activity.

In company towns such as Eckley, Freeland, Drifton, and surrounding anthracite patches, coal companies associated with the Coxe interests exercised extensive control over miners’ daily lives through company-owned housing, stores, and employment systems. Historians of the anthracite region have documented how miners and their families could face eviction, blacklisting, loss of income, and economic ruin during labor disputes and strikes. Immigrant mining families — including Irish, Slavic, Italian, Welsh, and other groups — often lived in extreme poverty while working under dangerous conditions for the benefit of powerful coal and railroad interests.

The violence surrounding the Lattimer Massacre reflected broader tensions throughout the anthracite coal region, where many mining communities feared retaliation, displacement, and financial devastation tied to labor organizing and resistance against company control. Oral histories and local family accounts from the region describe the long-term hardship and displacement experienced by many mining families connected to the Coxe coal operations.

== Events ==
=== Strike ===
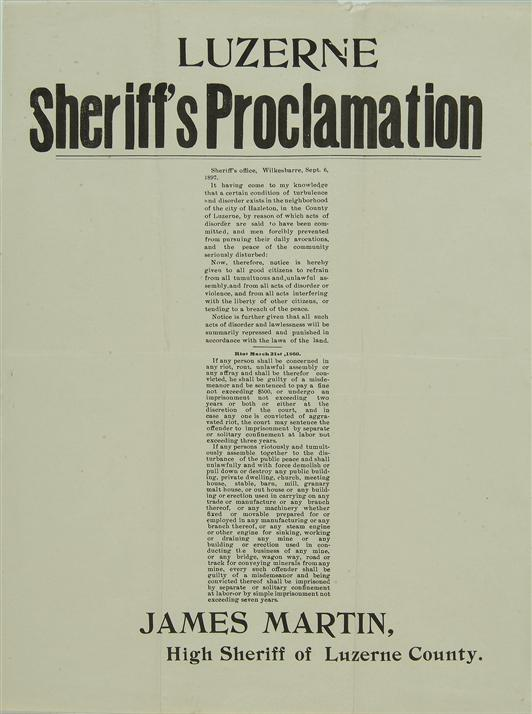
A proclamation by Sheriff Martin, dated September 6, 1897, warning against unlawful assembly, "tumult", and interference with the peaceful operation of any mines or mining equipment

In August 1897, the Honey Brook division of the Lehigh and Wilkes-Barre Coal Company laid off workers at its strip mines, cut the pay of the remaining employees, and raised fees for workers residing in the area's company towns. The company consolidated its mule stables, forcing teenage mule drivers to travel, unpaid, much farther each day to pick up their mules. After inconclusive talks, 25 to 35 teenaged drivers struck on August 14, 1897. A scuffle between a supervisor and some drivers led to additional walkouts by strip miners and underground coal miners; by August 16 nearly 2,000 workers were on strike.

Nearly all the miners joined the UMW (United Mine Workers) on August 18; within two days, almost all the mines in the region had closed due to the spreading strike. Many Slavic miners had not joined the nascent United Mine Workers.

The first wave of the strike ended on August 23, 1897, after the company agreed to pay overtime, bring wages up to the regional average, allow miners to see their own doctors when injured, and no longer force miners to live in company-owned housing.

A second strike began on August 25. Teenaged breaker boys at the A.S. Van Wickle coal breaker in the nearby village of Colerain struck for higher wages as well. When Van Wickle attempted to use Slavic workers as strikebreakers, the Slavs also joined the strike. Although the strike spread to two other nearby coal works, the company quickly agreed to raise wages up to the regional average, and the strike ended on about August 28.

When the new pay rates were announced on September 1, 1897, only a few workers received raises. but the mine owners reneged on their other promises.

The strikes resumed. On September 3, 3,000 workers marched on four mines, shutting them down.

The mine owners' private armed force, the Coal and Iron Police, proved too few in number to break the strike, so the owners appealed for help from Luzerne County Sheriff James F. Martin. Martin established a posse of about 100 English and Irish men to prevent any further marches. But, within five days, 8,000 to 10,000 miners were on strike. On September 8, mine owners demanded that the sheriff of Schuylkill County arrest several thousand miners who had assembled near Pottsville and had forced a mine to shut down, but the sheriff refused.

=== Massacre ===
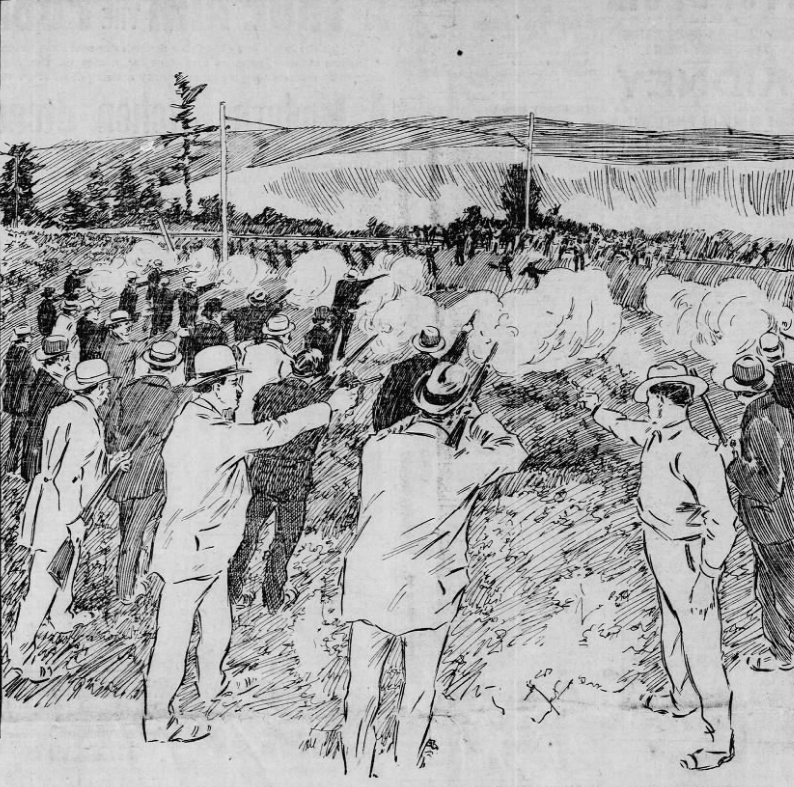
Retreating striking miners being shot in their backs by deputized posse, September 10, 1897

On Friday, September 10, 1897, about 300 to 400 unarmed strikers—nearly all of them Slavs and Germans—marched to a coal mine owned by Calvin Pardee at the town of Lattimer to support a newly formed United Mine Workers union. Their goal was to support the newly formed UMW union at the still-open Lattimer mine. The demonstrators were confronted by law enforcement officials several times on the road and ordered to disperse, but kept marching.

The deputies had spent most of the morning joking about how many miners they would kill. While on a streetcar headed for Lattimer with the sheriff and his posse, one deputy was overheard saying, "I bet I drop six of them when I get over there."

When the demonstrators reached Lattimer at 3:45 pm, they were met again by the sheriff and 150 armed deputies. Sheriff Martin ordered the marchers to disperse, and attempted to grab an American flag out of the hands of the lead marcher. A scuffle ensued, and the police opened fire on the unarmed crowd.

At least 19 miners were killed, and between 17 and 49 were wounded. Many had been shot in the back, and several had multiple gunshot wounds, which indicated that they had been targeted by the deputies.

== Aftermath ==
The strike led to temporary mass unrest in the area. After Sheriff Martin telephoned for help, the Pennsylvania National Guard was dispatched to the county to restore order. Late on the evening of September 10, 1897, more than 2,500 troops of the Third Brigade (partly stationed in Luzerne County) had been deployed. Local Slavic community leaders held a rally on September 11 to try to calm the workers, raise money for the support of families of the dead and wounded, and seek the prosecution of Sheriff Martin and his deputies.

Outraged miners searched in vain on September 12 for Lehigh and Wilkes-Barre Coal Company mine superintendent Gomer Jones, and destroyed his home when they could not find him. On September 20, a group of Slavic women armed with fireplace pokers and rolling pins led some 150 men and boys to shut down the McAdoo coal works, but were turned back by the quick arrival of National Guard troops. The Guard's artillery unit was withdrawn on September 24, and the rest of the troops five days later.

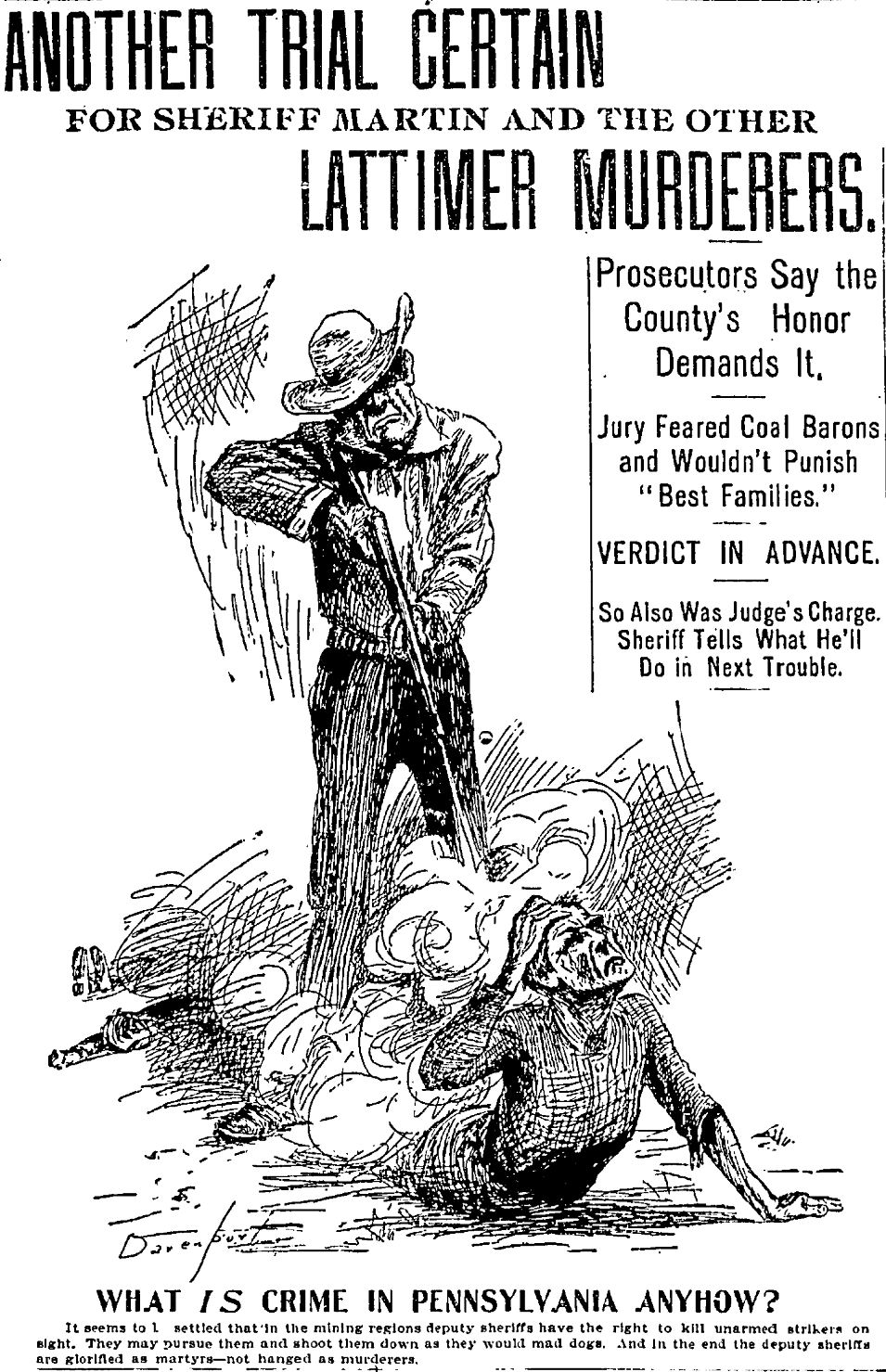
Deputy shooting a miner, while he is on the ground. Caption reads "What is crime in Pennsylvania anyhow?".

Sheriff Martin and 73 deputies were arrested and put on trial. At trial, the defendants claimed that the marchers had refused to obey an order to disperse and were charging toward the sheriff and his deputies.

Witness John Pusti gave a different account in formal testimony:

I was with the strikers when the shooting occurred. When we approached the Sheriff he walked to the middle of the road and told us to stop. Some few of the men went forward, and I then heard two volleys from the deputies. None of the strikers was armed. I was shot in the right arm and as I started to run I was shot in the right leg, the ball entering from the back and coming out in front.

Further medical evidence showed that nearly all the strikers had been shot in the back. Nonetheless, the sheriff and his deputies were acquitted.

The Lattimer massacre was a turning point in the history of the United Mine Workers (UMW). After having struggled to establish itself in Pennsylvania's coal mines, the massacre resulted in a dramatic entry of more than 10,000 new members. The incident also helped end a longstanding myth about the docility of non-English speaking miners. Three years later, the union was strong enough to win large wage increases and safety improvements for miners throughout the region.

These events significantly boosted the union career of John Mitchell, an activist for the UMW who was elected president of the national union because of his efforts during the Lattimer strikes.

The crossroads where the Lattimer massacre occurred did not have any commemoration for 80 years. In 1972, the United Labor Council of Lower Luzerne and Carbon counties and the UMW erected a small memorial on the site.

== List of victims ==
According to a contemporary report in the New York Herald, 21 men were killed in the Lattimer massacre:

- Michael Cheslock (Ceslak); the only miner who was a naturalized U.S. citizen
- Sebastian Bozestoski, age 35
- John Chobonshi, age 23
- Adalbert Czaja, age 27
- John Futa, age 29
- John Gastack, age 32
- Antonio Grazke, age 33
- Frank Kodel, age 24
- Andrew Kollick, age 30
- Andre Nikzkowuski, age 27
- Rulof Rekenits, age 35
- John Ruski, age 28
- John Sheka, age 27
- John Tranke, age 32
- John Turnasdich, age 27
- Stephen Urich, age 27
- Andrew Varicku, age 28
- Andrew Yerkman, age 31
- Stanley Zagorski, age 45
- Adam Zamoski, age 26
- Andrew Zeminski, age 31
- John Zernovick, age 33

== See also ==
- List of worker deaths in United States labor disputes
- List of incidents of civil unrest in the United States
