= Glendon Iron Company =

- Trade name: Glendon Iron Company
- Industry: Iron production
- Founded: 1842
- Founder: Charles Jackson, Jr.
- Defunct: 1896
- Fate: Failed in 1896
- Key people: Charles Jackson, Jr., William Firmstone, Francis Cabot Lowell II
- Products: Pig iron
- Production output: 7000 tons per year
- Owner: Charles Jackson, Jr. (initially)

The Glendon Iron Company was an iron company in the Lehigh Valley, in Pennsylvania, in the United States. It was the second iron furnace in Lehigh Valley to be fueled by anthracite. The company was established in 1842 and disestablished in 1896. Its leaders were primarily based in Boston and Hazleton. The company's main methods of export were via the Lehigh Canal and the Morris Canal. The company started out with a single furnace, but eventually came to own five furnaces.

== Description of the furnaces ==
The first furnace of the Glendon Iron company received its power from two waterwheels in the Lehigh Canal. The waterwheels were 15 feet (4.6 m) in diameter. The waterwheels powered a pair of horizontally positioned blast cylinders. The second furnace to be built was 45 feet (14 m) high. Its bosh measured 10 feet (3.0 m) by 14 feet (4.3 m). After 1850, it was powered by a common blast. The common blast was powered by both steam power and water power. The third furnace to be built was the same height as the second. However, its bosh was 14 feet (4.3 m) by 16 feet (4.9 m). This furnace was powered by the same common blast as the second furnace. The fifth furnace had a stack that was 75 feet (23 m) high. It had a bosh that had a diameter of 18 feet (5.5 m). The stack was made of sheet iron. This was the most productive of the furnaces owned by the Glendon Iron Company.

In 1874, the first furnace of the Glendon Iron Company was rebuilt by William Firmstone with the intent of modernizing it. After being rebuilt, the furnace was 63 feet (19 m) tall, and its bosh had a diameter of 18 feet (5.5 m). In 1881, the second and third furnaces were rebuilt by Frank Firmstone, William Firmstone's son. The purpose of the rebuilding was again to modernize the furnaces. After being rebuilt, the furnaces were both 80 feet (24 m) tall. They had boshes that were 18 feet (5.5 m) in diameter. All of the first three furnaces were modernized once more in between 1887 and 1889.

== History ==
The Glendon Iron Company was established in 1842. The land was secured by the Boston businessman Charles Jackson, Jr. The company began to produce pig iron in 1844. A second furnace was built in 1846. The third furnace belonging to the company was constructed in 1850. In 1852, the company purchased the Teabo mine in Hibernia, New Jersey. They stopped using this mine in 1892. Charles Jackson, Jr. bought the South Easton Iron Furnace for the Glendon Iron Company in 1854. The company was incorporated in 1862. A total of five furnaces were owned by the company by 1868. The company began to decline in 1884. It bought steam-blowing engines from the I.P. Morris Company in 1893, but failed to stop the decline.

Due to a decrease in demand for pig iron and difficult economic times, the company closed in 1896. The buildings of the company's furnace were demolished at the beginning of the 1900s. The demolition was completed by 1914. The steam-blowing engines were bought by the Empire Steel and Iron Company. The land that the Glendon Iron Company was on were eventually regained by the Lehigh Coal and Navigation Company.

The Glendon Iron Company was the largest industry in the vicinity of Easton for large portions of the 1800s.

== Employees and leaders ==
The leaders of the Glendon Iron Company were capitalists from Boston and Hazleton. The company was managed by William Firmstone. While under Firmstone's leadership, the company's furnace became one of the largest in Pennsylvania. When William Firmstone died in 1877, his son Frank took his place. Frank Firmstone resigned from the company in 1887. After Firmstone's resignation, John Thomas became the superintendent of the company. John S. Fackenthal succeeded Thomas for the position in 1889. By 1855, most of the residents of Glendon were employees of the company. The Glendon Iron Company was initially owned by Charles Jackson, Jr.

== Import, production, and export ==
A large amount of the pig iron produced by the Glendon Iron Company was mined in Williams Township, Northampton County. The mines used by the company contained six mine shafts. These ranged from 250 feet (76 m) deep for Shaft Number 6 to 325 feet (99 m) deep for the Glendon Shaft and Shaft Number 3. The remaining pig iron was brought to the furnace from New Jersey, via the Morris Canal. Magnetite was also brought to the company from New Jersey. The finished product was then sent to the Morris Canal by the Lehigh Navigation company. From the Morris Canal, the iron was shipped by sea to New York City and Boston, where it was rolled into bars at the Glendon Rolling Mill and also made into finished products. However, after the Glendon Rolling Mill closed in 1857, the Glendon Iron Company began selling their iron to what was known as the Grey Forge market instead. By 1846, the company was producing 7000 tons of iron per year. Typically, the 25% of the raw ore being used by the Glendon Iron Company was magnetite from New Jersey and the remaining 75% was brown hematite from the nearby Williams Township.

== See also ==
- Cambria Iron Company
