= Lattimer, Pennsylvania =

Unincorporated community in Pennsylvania, US

- Census-designated place
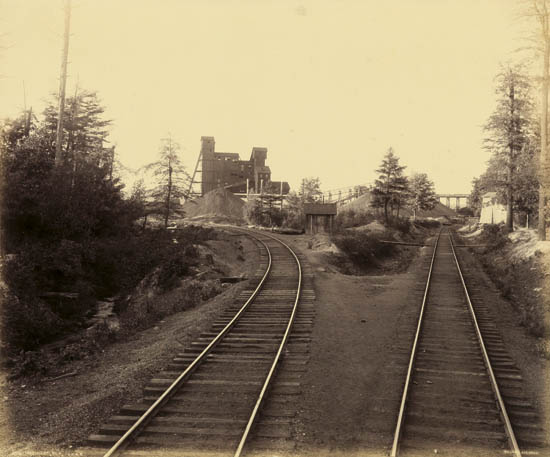
- The Lattimer Colliery, photographed circa 1890 by William H. Rau

- Location in Pennsylvania Location in the United States
- Coordinates: 40°59′38″N 75°57′40″W
- Country: United States
- State: Pennsylvania
- County: Luzerne
- Township: Hazle

Area
  - Total: 0.23 sq mi (0.59 km^{2})
  - Land: 0.23 sq mi (0.59 km^{2})
  - Water: 0 sq mi (0.00 km^{2})

Population (2020)
  - Total: 567
  - Density: 2,473.1/sq mi (954.86/km^{2})
- Time zone: UTC-5 (Eastern (EST))
  - Summer (DST): UTC-4 (EDT)
- ZIP code: 18234
- Area code: 570
- FIPS code: 42-41700

Lattimer is a village and census-designated place (CDP) in Hazle Township, Luzerne County, Pennsylvania, United States. The population was 554 at the 2010 census.

== History ==
The Lattimer massacre took place in the village on September 10, 1897; it resulted in the deaths of at least 19 unarmed striking immigrant anthracite coal miners. The miners, mostly of Polish, Slovak, Lithuanian, and German ethnicity, were shot and killed by a Luzerne County sheriff's posse. Scores more were wounded. The massacre was a turning point in the history of the United Mine Workers (UMW).

== Geography ==
Lattimer is located at 40°59′38″N 75°57′40″W.

According to the United States Census Bureau, the CDP has a total area of 0.23 square miles (0.6 km^{2}), all land. It is located directly northeast of the CDP of Harleigh and lies 1 mile (2 km) northeast of the city of Hazleton. Lattimer uses the Hazleton zip code of 18234.

== Demographics ==
Historical population
Census	Pop.	Note	%±
2020	567		—
U.S. Decennial Census

== Education ==
The school district is the Hazleton Area School District.

== Notable people ==
- Matt Broderick, former MLB player
- Wayne Foux, IT Pioneer Quantum Packets
- Jack Palance, Academy Award-winning actor
