= Pardeesville, Pennsylvania =

Unincorporated community in Pennsylvania, US

- Census-designated place
- Location in Pennsylvania Location in the United States
- Coordinates: 41°0′11″N 75°57′46″W
- Country: United States
- State: Pennsylvania
- County: Luzerne
- Township: Hazle

Government
  - Mayor: Matthew James Kundrick

Area
  - Total: 0.63 sq mi (1.64 km^{2})
  - Land: 0.63 sq mi (1.64 km^{2})
  - Water: 0 sq mi (0.00 km^{2})

Population (2020)
  - Total: 574
  - Density: 905.6/sq mi (349.65/km^{2})
- Time zone: UTC-5 (Eastern (EST))
  - Summer (DST): UTC-4 (EDT)
- Area code: 570
- FIPS code: 42-57904

Pardeesville is a census-designated place (CDP) in Hazle Township, Luzerne County, Pennsylvania, United States. The population was 572 at the 2010 census.

== Geography ==
Pardeesville is located at 41°0′11″N 75°57′46″W.

According to the United States Census Bureau, the CDP has a total area of 0.66 square miles (1.7 km^{2}), all land. Pardeesville's altitude is 1,670 feet (510 m) above sea level, and it is located just east of Pennsylvania Route 309 along the crest of Buck Mountain. It uses the Hazleton zip code of 18202.

== Demographics ==
Historical population
Census	Pop.	Note	%±
2020	574		—
U.S. Decennial Census

== Education ==
The school district is the Hazleton Area School District.
