= Center for Book Arts =

American nonprofit organization

The Center for Book Arts

Location
- 28 West 27th Street, 3rd Floor; Manhattan, New York 10001; United States
- Coordinates: 40°44′41.38″N 73°59′23.6″W

Information
- Type: Art Not-for-Profit
- Established: 1974
- Founder: Richard Minsky
- Executive Director: Corina Reynolds
- Classes offered: Bookbinding, letterpress printing, paper marbling, typography
- Campus type: Urban
- Website: centerforbookarts.org
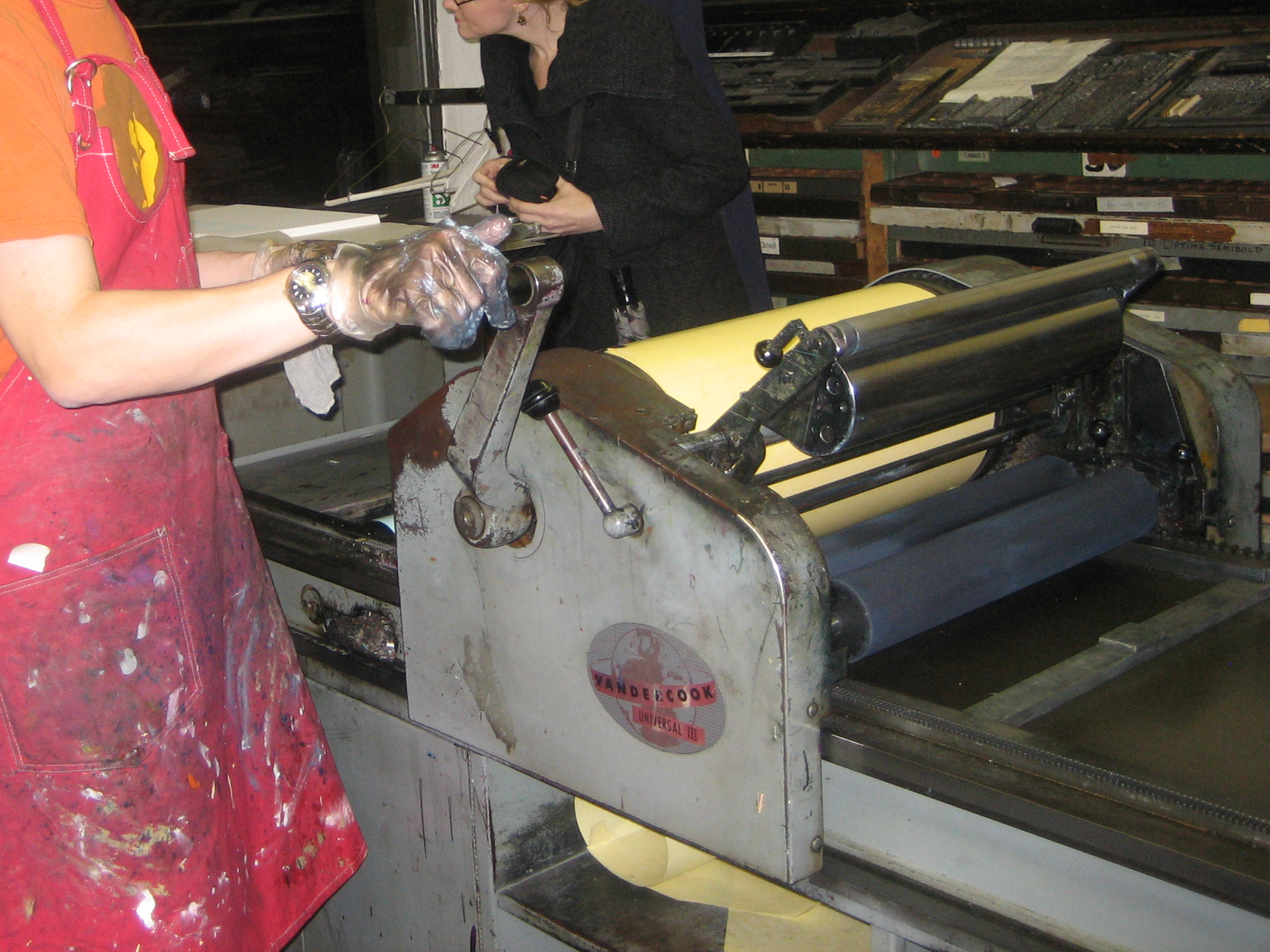
- Letterpress shop at the Center for Book Arts

Center for Book Arts (CBA) is a non-profit arts organization, founded in 1974. It is the first organization of its kind in the United States dedicated to contemporary interpretations of the book as an art object while preserving traditional practices of the art of the book.

== History ==
Founded in 1974 by book artist and master bookbinder Richard Minsky, at its founding, Center for Book Arts was the first organization of its kind and became the model for the establishment of similar institutions across the country. Today CBA is one of the country’s most prominent non-profit organizations specializing in the book arts with active exhibition and education programs.

In 2017, the Center for Book Arts was awarded a New York City Cultural Tourism Grant.

== About ==
The non-profit organization offers over 100 classes and workshops in bookbinding, letterpress printing, paper marbling, typography, and related fields. The 5,000-square-foot (460 m^{2}) center in Manhattan features a 900-square-foot (84 m^{2}) exhibition space which is open to visitors.

== Collections initiative ==
According to their 2011 Annual Report, the Center for Book Arts debuted its digitized collections in October 2010.

The collections include a Fine Art Collection of over 2500 artist's books, a Reference Collection, and an Archives Collection. Each of these collections can be viewed through the CBA online catalogue paired with a detailed record of the item.

=== Archives collection ===
This collection documents the distinctive history of the Center’s programmatic and administrative activities as the first non-profit book arts organization of its kind in the United States. This collection includes ephemera and institutional records relating to historical exhibitions, classes, publications, and events.

== Publications ==
Exhibition catalogues from Center for Book Arts' long history can be purchased online through the organization's online book shop and through the distributor Oak Knoll Press. Visitors to the organization's website can also purchase letterpress printed poetry broadsides, chapbooks, artist's books and one-of-a-kind bookworks. Thirty percent of all sales is given back to the organization for advancement.

=== Journals ===
==== Book Art Review: A New Book Art Criticism (BAR) ====
In 2022, the Center for Book Arts published the first issue (April 2022) of BAR, a print and digital magazine for critical writing about artists' books. BAR is slated to be published twice a year.

== Exhibitions ==
Center for Book Arts hosts 8-12 exhibitions annually of contemporary and historical book art. The 900 square foot gallery is reserved for group exhibitions focussing on larger thematic topics in the field. Recent examples of this include Americans Looking In (2020), Poetry is not a Luxury (2019),
