= Calvin Pardee =

American businessman

- Born: July 17, 1841
- Died: March 18, 1923 (aged 81)
- Education: Rensselaer Polytechnic Institute
- Occupation: Businessman
- Known for: Coal, land, and electricity businesses in Pennsylvania
- Spouse: Mary Byrne Day (m. 1867)
- Children: 9

Calvin Pardee (July 7, 1841 – March 18, 1923) was an American businessman from Pennsylvania. He attended the Luzerne Presbyterian Institute and later the Rensselaer Polytechnic Institute. He did business in Pennsylvania and several other states. His business was mostly related to coal, land, and natural gas.

He worked in the Glendon Iron Company in his youth. He was later the treasurer of numerous companies in Pennsylvania. These were mostly electric companies.

== Early life and education ==
Pardee was born on July 17, 1841. He was the son of the industrial tycoon Ario Pardee. In 1851, Pardee, along with one of his brothers, was sent to Wyoming's Luzerne Presbyterian Institute. However, following an argument with the headmaster of the Institute, Pardee was withdrawn from the Institute in 1854. He was instead sent to the West Jersey Collegiate Institute. In 1857, Pardee joined the Rensselaer Polytechnic Institute, and in 1860, he graduated from the institute, where he was in the fraternity Theta Delta Chi.

== Coal-related work ==
Pardee joined the Glendon Iron Company after he graduated. This company primarily belonged to his father and was based in Easton, Pennsylvania. For 22 years, he worked as the superintendent of mines in his father's company and was based in Hazleton, Pennsylvania. In 1884, he left his father's company to pursue his own work in several enterprises, including the coal business and the natural gas business. He was the founder of the Pardee Brothers Company, which was his most significant source of wealth. In 1903, his children inherited the company.

The Pardee Brothers Company was primarily developed to exploit coal mines near Lattimer.

After Pardee's sons joined his business, he began to build businesses for coal and land, among other things, in Kentucky, Louisiana, Virginia, and West Virginia.

Pardee was the treasurer of several companies. These included the Beaver Meadow Electric Railway, the Butler Township Power Company, the Coal Township Electric Company, the Conyngham Township Electric Company, the East Union Township Electric Company, the Fairview Township Electric Company, the Mahanoy Township Electric Company, the Mount Carmel Township Electric Company, the Union Township Power Company, the Wright Township Power Company, the Wilkes-Barre Township Power Company, and the West Mahanoy Township Power Company. He also became an officer of the Hazleton Gas Company in 1879.

Pardee owned several collieries in the Coal Region.

Pardee owned the mines worked by the miners who were massacred in the Lattimer massacre. However, he was in Germantown at the time. He returned to Hazleton on September 15, after the massacre. He was eager to restart his mines and was "disgusted" that his superintendents were unable to get his collieries to resume their running. He was also strongly opposed to increasing his miners' wages shortly before the Lattimer Massacre.

== Other work ==
In April 1861, Pardee joined the Union Army in the American Civil War. He participated in the Battle of Antietam and several minor battles. He was a captain in the army. He retired on October 30, 1862 after getting typhoid fever. He also funded the construction of the Pardee Dormitory at Rensselaer. It was completed in 1925.

== Personal life ==
On June 4, 1867, Pardee married Mary Byrne Day. The couple had nine children: Estelle, Alice, Calvin, Alfred, Ario, Ellie, (Note: Died as a child) Olive, Howard and Helen. Pardee and his family moved to Philadelphia. He bought a summer farm in Whitemarsh in 1889. Near the end of his life, he enjoyed traveling to distant places including the Far East, Russia, Egypt, and Europe. He also regularly hosted family members at his summer home. Pardee's health started failing during the spring of 1922. He died on March 18, 1923. He was the grandfather of William Green Foulke.

Pardee was friends with John R. Fell. In 1889, he purchased 69 acres of land near Fell's estate.

== See also ==
- Ario Pardee
