= Ario Pardee =

American engineer, coal baron and railway director

Ariovistus Pardee
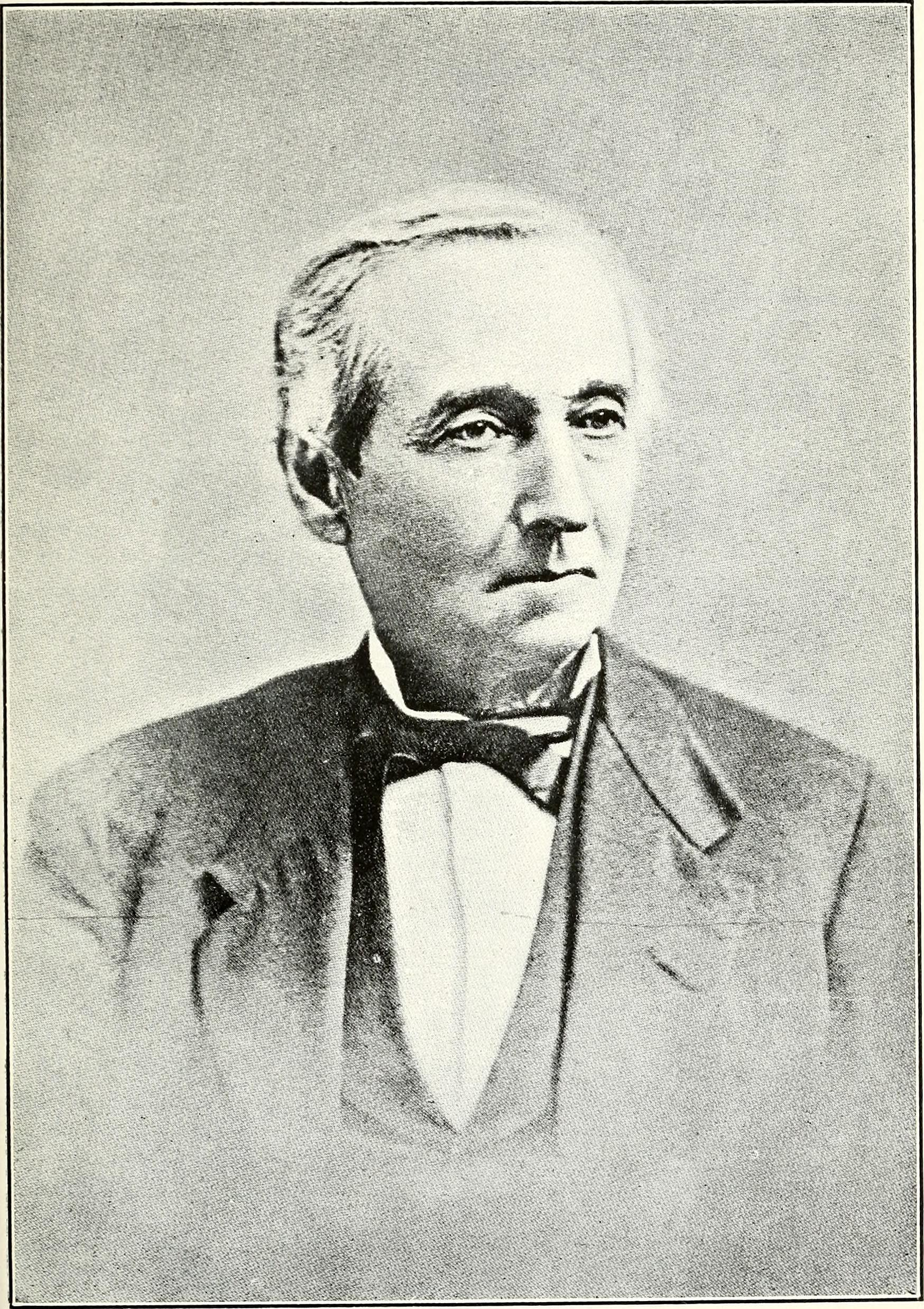
- Born: November 19, 1810; Chatham, New York, US
- Died: March 26, 1892 (aged 81); Rockledge, Florida, US
- Occupations: Coal baron, philanthropist
- Known for: Founder of Hazleton, Pennsylvania

Ariovistus Pardee (November 19, 1810 – March 26, 1892) was an American engineer, coal baron, philanthropist, and director of the Lehigh Valley Railroad. In the 1840s he began purchasing land in Hazleton, Pennsylvania, suspecting it to contain a wealth of coal. When he began mining the area, the town went through an economic boom, and credited Pardee as its founder. Pardee was also a major benefactor of Lafayette College to which he donated over $500,000, and had a building on campus named after him.

== Early life ==
Pardee was born in Chatham, New York, to Ariovistus and Eliza (née Platt), and grew up in nearby Rensselaer County where his father owned a farm. He was a descendant of George Pardee, who immigrated from England to the New Haven Colony by 1644. Pardee was taught by his father while working on the farm and received some formal education in engineering from a schoolhouse in town run by the Presbyterian minister, Moses Hunter.

== Career ==
In 1829, Pardee left New York to work as a rodman (or surveyor's assistant) on the construction of the Delaware and Raritan Canal. One of the key purposes of this canal was to move anthracite coal out from the mountains to be processed in factories in New Jersey. Pardee often referred to this job as the key turning point in his life. After the completion of the canal, Pardee was sent to the Beaver Meadow Railroad Company to survey and find a location for the company's railroad which would be used for the shipment of coal. While there, he realized the potential earnings in the anthracite industry if it were connected to railways, rather than canals. After a brief trip to Michigan, where his parents had relocated to, Pardee settled down in Hazleton, Pennsylvania. Here, he signed on with the Hazleton Railroad and Coal Company as a superintendent.

In 1840, Pardee began buying land in Hazleton, believing it to contain more coal than its current operators realized. He formed his own coal mining company with business partner John Gillingham Fell, who would later go on to become the president of the Lehigh Valley Railroad. The land Pardee purchased turned out to sit on an incredibly valuable vein of anthracite, and the company began setting up mines to extract the valuable coal. In 1848, Pardee built a gravity railroad to ship his coal, which was later connected to the greater Lehigh Valley railroad. The effect of this new industry transformed Hazleton from a cluster of houses to a populated town, and Pardee personally helped found many banks, churches, schools, and libraries, thus being credited as the founder of Hazleton.

He was elected as a member of the American Philosophical Society in 1867.

Pardee diversified his interests following the success of anthracite mining and by 1888 was engaged in iron manufacture, operating blast furnaces in Pennsylvania, New York, New Jersey, Virginia, and Tennessee.

During the American Civil War, Pardee funded a military company in which his son, Ario Pardee Jr. served. The company was known as the "Pardee Rifles". Pardee Jr. would later earn valor at the Battle of Gettysburg, and a monument at the battleground now commemorates "Pardee Field".

== Lafayette College ==
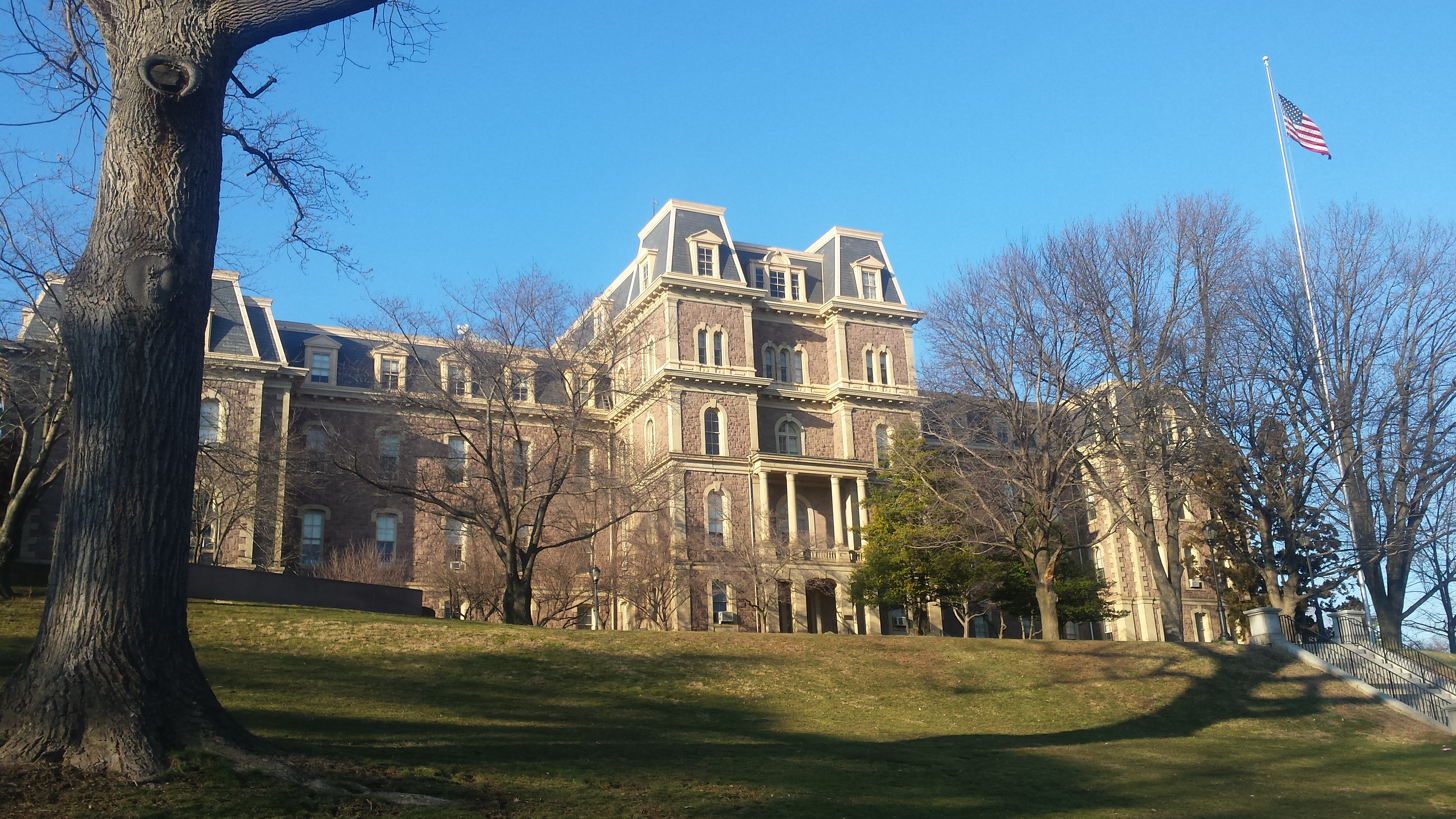
Pardee Hall on the Lafayette College campus

With the onset of the Civil War, Lafayette College saw a drastic reduction in its student population and was nearing bankruptcy. Reverend William Cassady Cattell was called in as the college's new president, tasked with finding endowments to keep the college, on the verge of closing, alive. In 1864, Cattell visited Hazleton at the invitation of Pardee to deliver a sermon, and afterwards Cattell explained to Pardee the financial situation the college was in. That same day Pardee gave a gift of $20,000 (equivalent to $325,499 in 2024 dollars), for the school's use, which was at the time the largest sum ever given to an educational institution in Pennsylvania. Without this gift the college would have faced certain closure.

Pardee, now a director for the Lehigh Valley Railroad as well as a coal magnate, realized the need for trained engineers in the railroad and mining industries and went back to Lafayette in 1865 with a proposal to fund the college's scientific course. With another gift, this time of $100,000, the "Pardee Scientific Course" was created, and the college began issuing engineering degrees for the first time. Shortly after its creation, the college realized the need for a new building on campus to house its growing scientific program and Pardee made another gift of $250,000 to construct this new building. An additional gift of $50,000 was given for equipment for the science program. This building, dedicated as "Pardee Hall", opened in 1873 and was regarded as "the largest and most complete scientific college building in the United States." In 1879, the building burned down but was rebuilt with the same appearance by the end of 1880. The building was burned down again in an act of arson in 1897, but was again rebuilt by 1899.

Pardee was a member of the Board of Trustees to Lafayette College for 27 years, and also served as its president from 1881 to 1892. His total donations to the school at the time of his death reached the sum of $522,883 (equivalent to $8.37 million in 2024 dollars).

== Personal life ==
Pardee married Elizabeth Jacobs in 1838, with whom he had four children: Ario, Calvin, Alice, and Ellen. A fifth child was conceived but died in childbirth in 1847 along with Elizabeth.

Now a widower with four young children, Pardee hired a governess, Anna Maria Robison, to help him raise his children. They married in 1848 and had nine children: William, Israel, Anna, Barton, Frank, Bessie, Edith, Robert, and Gertrude. Israel, his second child with Anna Maria, was a twin, but the other child died during birth.

Pardee died on March 26, 1892, in Rockledge, Florida. His funeral service was given by William Cassady Cattell. At the time of Pardee's death, he was one of the richest men in America, with a personal estate valued at $30 million ($934 million in 2024 dollars).
