= Harleigh, Pennsylvania =

Unincorporated community in Pennsylvania, US

- Census-designated place
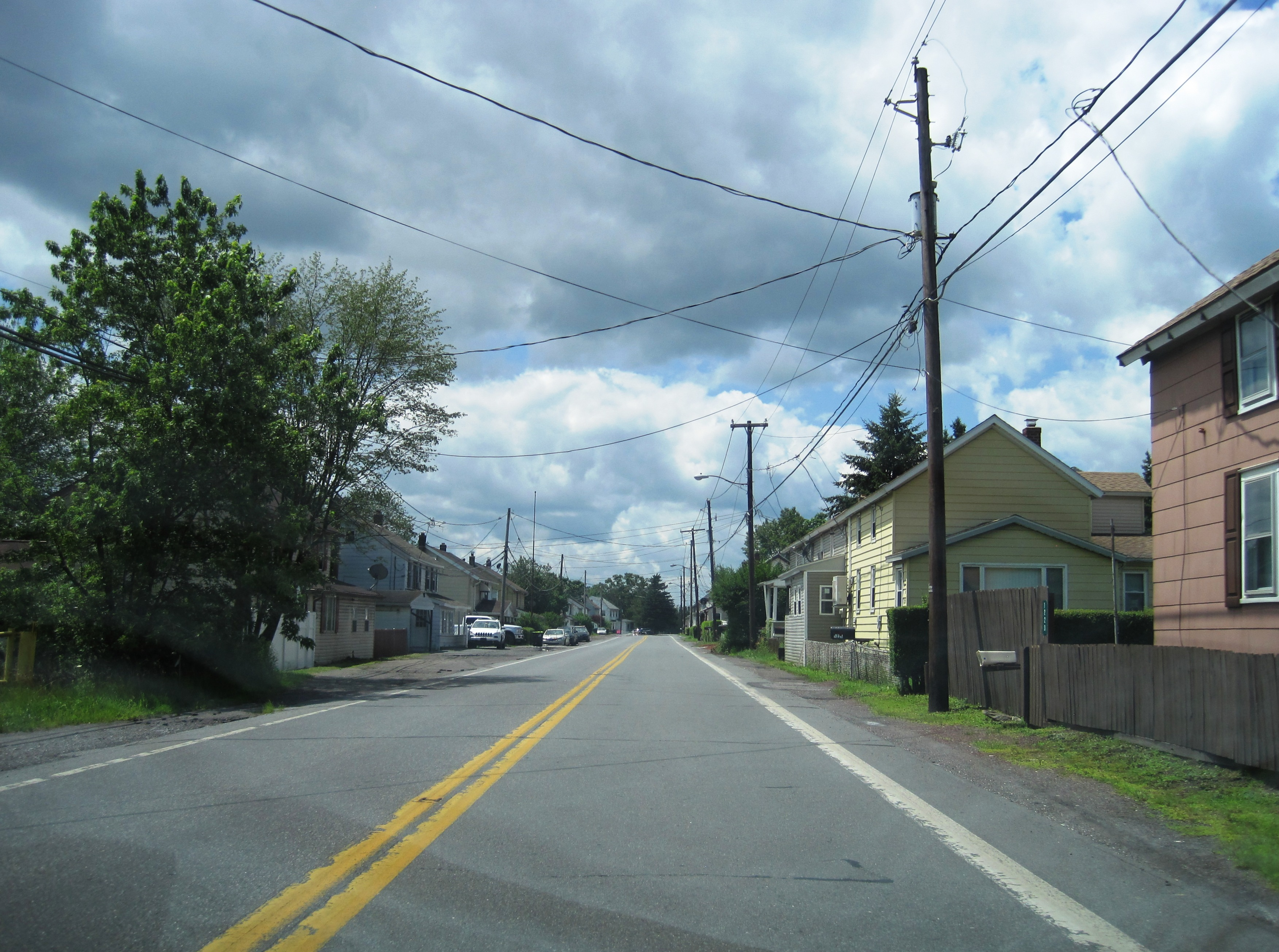
- Looking west along PA 940

- Location in Pennsylvania Location in the United States
- Coordinates: 40°59′0″N 75°58′20″W
- Country: United States
- State: Pennsylvania
- County: Luzerne
- Township: Hazle

Area
  - Total: 0.57 sq mi (1.48 km^{2})
  - Land: 0.57 sq mi (1.48 km^{2})
  - Water: 0 sq mi (0.00 km^{2})

Population (2020)
  - Total: 1,050
  - Density: 1,834.4/sq mi (708.26/km^{2})
- Time zone: UTC-5 (Eastern (EST))
  - Summer (DST): UTC-4 (EDT)
- ZIP code: 18225
- Area codes: 570 and 272
- FIPS code: 42-32600

Harleigh is a census-designated place (CDP) in Hazle Township, Luzerne County, Pennsylvania, United States, north of the city of Hazleton. The CDP population was 1,104 at the 2010 census.

== Geography ==
Harleigh is located at 40°59′0″N 75°58′20″W.

According to the United States Census Bureau, the CDP has a total area of 0.58 square miles (1.5 km^{2}), all land. Harleigh is located less than one mile north of the city of Hazleton, along PA 940 (an east–west road). The western terminus of PA 940 is located just west of Harleigh at PA 309 (a north–south highway); it connects Hazleton (to the south) with Mountain Top and Wilkes-Barre (to the north).

== Demographics ==
Historical population
| Census | Pop. | Note | %± |
|---|---|---|---|
| 2020 | 1,050 | | — |
U.S. Decennial Census

The 2020 United States census gave the population as 1,050 people.

== Education ==
The school district is the Hazleton Area School District.
