= Jesse Fell =

American politician

Jesse Fell was an early political leader in Wilkes-Barre, Pennsylvania. He was one of the first Pennsylvanians to successfully burn anthracite on an open air grate. Anthracite differs from wood in that it needs a draft from the bottom, and Judge Fell proved with his grate design that it was a viable heating fuel. His method and 'discovery' in 1808 led to the widespread use of coal as the fuel source that helped to foster America's industrial revolution. He lived in the Fell House and Tavern until his death. The House stood until the 1980s when Wyoming Valley Health Care demolished it to build a parking lot. The bricks used to build the house are now in the house of Wayne Segar in Bear Creek Pennsylvania. The grate used by Fell is in the possession of the Wyoming Historical and Geological Society.
