= Frances Dorrance =

American librarian and archaeologist

- Born: 30 June 1877; Wilkes-Barre, Pennsylvania
- Died: 6 January 1973 (aged 95); Wilkes-Barre, Pennsylvania
- Occupations: Historic preservationist, librarian

Frances Strong Dorrance (30 June 1877 – 6 January 1973), known professionally as Frances Dorrance, was an American historic preservationist and librarian whose work focused on the study and preservation of Pennsylvania history and archaeology. Dorrance initiated the state's first statewide archaeological survey and founded the Society for Pennsylvania Archaeology.

== Early life and education ==
Dorrance was born 30 June 1877 in Wilkes-Barre, Pennsylvania, to Benjamin Ford Dorrance and Ruth Woodhull (Strong) Dorrance, descendants of the early settlers of Wyoming Valley, Pennsylvania. Dorrance graduated with honors from Wyoming Seminary in Kingston, Pennsylvania, in 1896. She then enrolled in Vassar College in New York and graduated cum laude and Phi Beta Kappa in 1900. She went on to receive a degree in library science from the New York School of Library Science in Albany.

Upon receiving her degree, she continued her studies at Columbia University; the Marine Biological Laboratory in Woods Hole, Massachusetts; and the University of Berlin, Germany. As part of her scholarship, she translated horticultural treatises on plant pathology from German to English. During this period, she also developed an interest in history and wrote papers on the 1779 Sullivan Expedition and the 1778 Battle of Wyoming in Pennsylvania.

== Career ==
=== Librarian ===
In 1919, Dorrance became a librarian at the Osterhout Free Library in Wilkes-Barre, Pennsylvania. From 1938 to 1953, she held the position of head librarian at the Hoyt Library in Kingston, Pennsylvania, and also served for a number of years as the director of the circulation department at the Wilkes College Library.

=== Historic preservationist ===
In 1922, Dorrance became the first executive director of the Luzerne County Historical Society, the oldest county historical society in Pennsylvania. The organization, then known as the Wyoming Historical and Geological Society, was directed by Dorrance until 1938. As one of her first acts as head of the society, Dorrance initiated the Indian Site Survey in 1923. Sent to museums, historical societies, and local authorities, its purpose was to identify and preserve Native American records, collections, and remains in eastern Pennsylvania. The survey began in March 1924 and was conducted by archaeologist Max Schrabisch. In 1926, the survey expanded to western Pennsylvania, becoming the state's first statewide survey of its kind. Also during this period, Dorrance and Colonel Dorrance Reynolds initiated the project that resulted in the compilation and publication of The Susquehannah Company Papers, a multi-volume set of documents detailing the 18th-century land disputes between Connecticut and Pennsylvania over the Wyoming Valley in what is now Pennsylvania.

In 1927, Dorrance attempted to form a statewide archaeological commission to support the expanded Indian Site Survey. She was unsuccessful in this effort but was appointed to the Pennsylvania Historical and Museum Commission (PHMC). She served on the PHMC until 1955. Dorrance continued her efforts to create a statewide archaeological committee, and in 1929, launched the Society for Pennsylvania Archaeology (SPA). SPA is a nonprofit organization intended to study and preserve Pennsylvania's archaeological heritage.

== Death and legacy ==
Dorrance died on 6 January 1973 at Hampton House, Hanover Township in Wilkes-Barre, Pennsylvania. She is buried at the Hollenback Cemetery in Wilkes-Barre.

Dorrance's 1924 Indian Site Survey was the start of what became the Pennsylvania Archaeological Site Survey program, an inventory of the state's archaeological sites. The Wilkes-Barre chapter of the Society for Pennsylvania Archaeology is named in Dorrance's honor.

== Recognition ==
- 1952, Distinguished Daughter of the Commonwealth of Pennsylvania
- 1970, J. Alden Mason Award from the Society for Pennsylvania Archaeology
- 2020, Pennsylvania State Historical Marker, Pennsylvania Historical & Museum Commission
