= River Street Historic District (Wilkes-Barre, Pennsylvania) =

Historic district in Pennsylvania, United States

- U.S. National Register of Historic Places
- U.S. Historic district
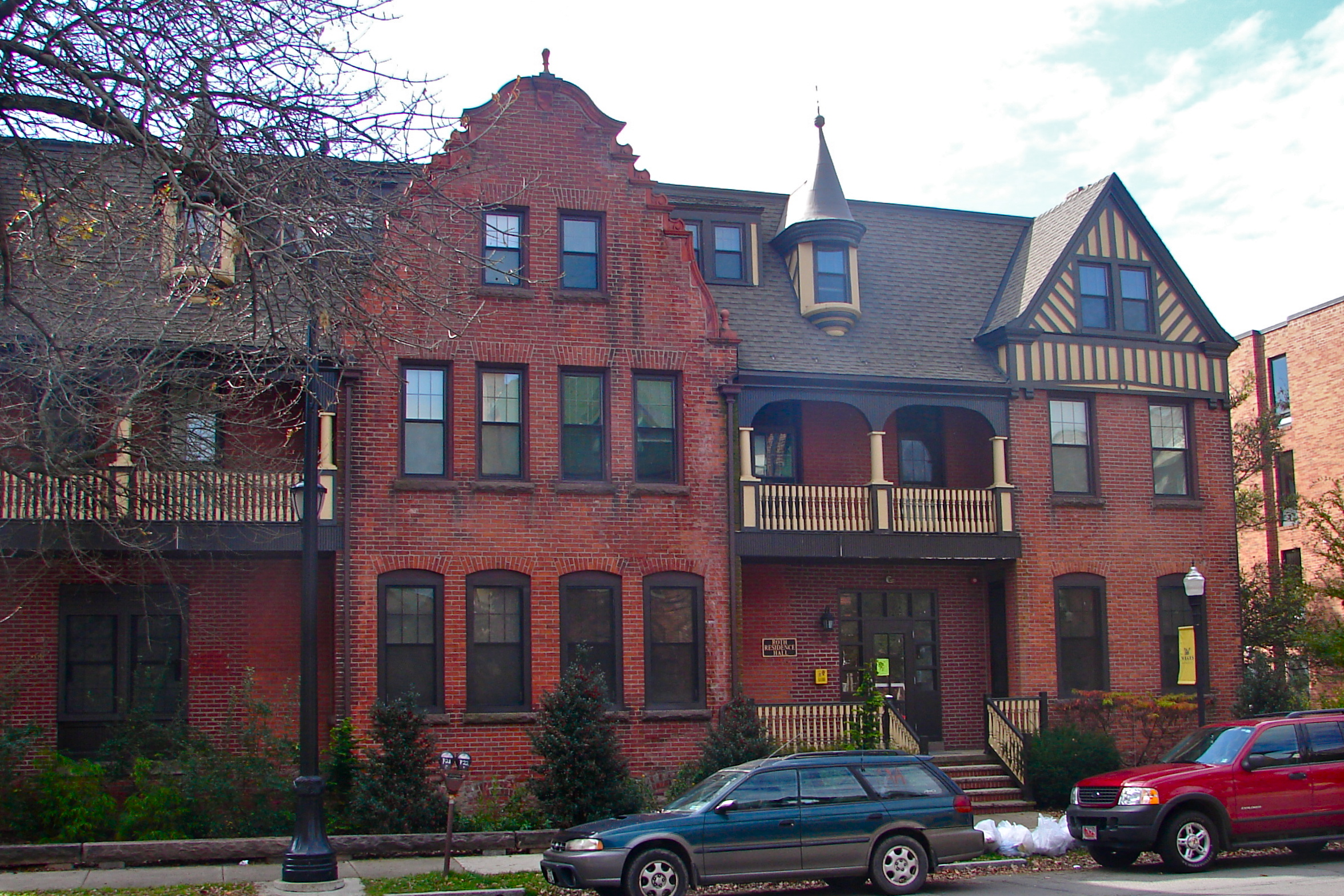
- Roth Residence Hall

- Location within Pennsylvania Location within the United States
- Interactive map showing the location for River Street Historic District
- Location: Franklin, River, W. River, W. Jackson, W. Union, W. Market, W. Northampton, W. South and W. Ross Sts. & Barnum Pl., Wilkes-Barre, Pennsylvania
- Coordinates: 41°14′49″N 75°53′09″W
- Area: 191 acres (77 ha)
- Built: 1860
- Architect: Multiple
- Architectural style: Mixed (more Than 2 Styles From Different Periods), Beaux Arts, Gothic
- NRHP reference No.: 85002328
- Added to NRHP: September 10, 1985

The River Street Historic District is a national historic district that is located in Wilkes-Barre, Pennsylvania.

It was added to the National Register of Historic Places in 1985.

== History ==
This district includes 215 contributing buildings that were built between 1860 and 1930, including notable examples of the Beaux Arts and Gothic Revival styles. Many of the contributing dwellings incorporate Wyoming Bluestone into the foundations and dressings.

== Description ==
The River Street Historic District is a national historic district located at Wilkes-Barre, Luzerne County, Pennsylvania. The district includes 215 contributing buildings near downtown in Wilkes-Barre on Franklin St., River St., W. River St., W. Jackson St., W. Union St., W. Market St., W. Northampton St., W. South St., and W. Ross, St., and Barnum Pl. The buildings were built between 1860 and 1930, and include notable examples of the Beaux Arts and Gothic Revival styles. Many of the contributing dwellings incorporate Wyoming Bluestone into the foundations and dressings.

Notable buildings include the S.L. Brown Home (1840s, 1886), George Bedford House (1875), former Presbyterian Church now Osterhout Library (1843–1852), "new" Presbyterian Church (1889), St. Stephen's Episcopal Pro-Cathedral (1897), Penn Bank Building (1911), First Eastern Building (1907), and Y.M.C.A. (1930).

== Gallery ==
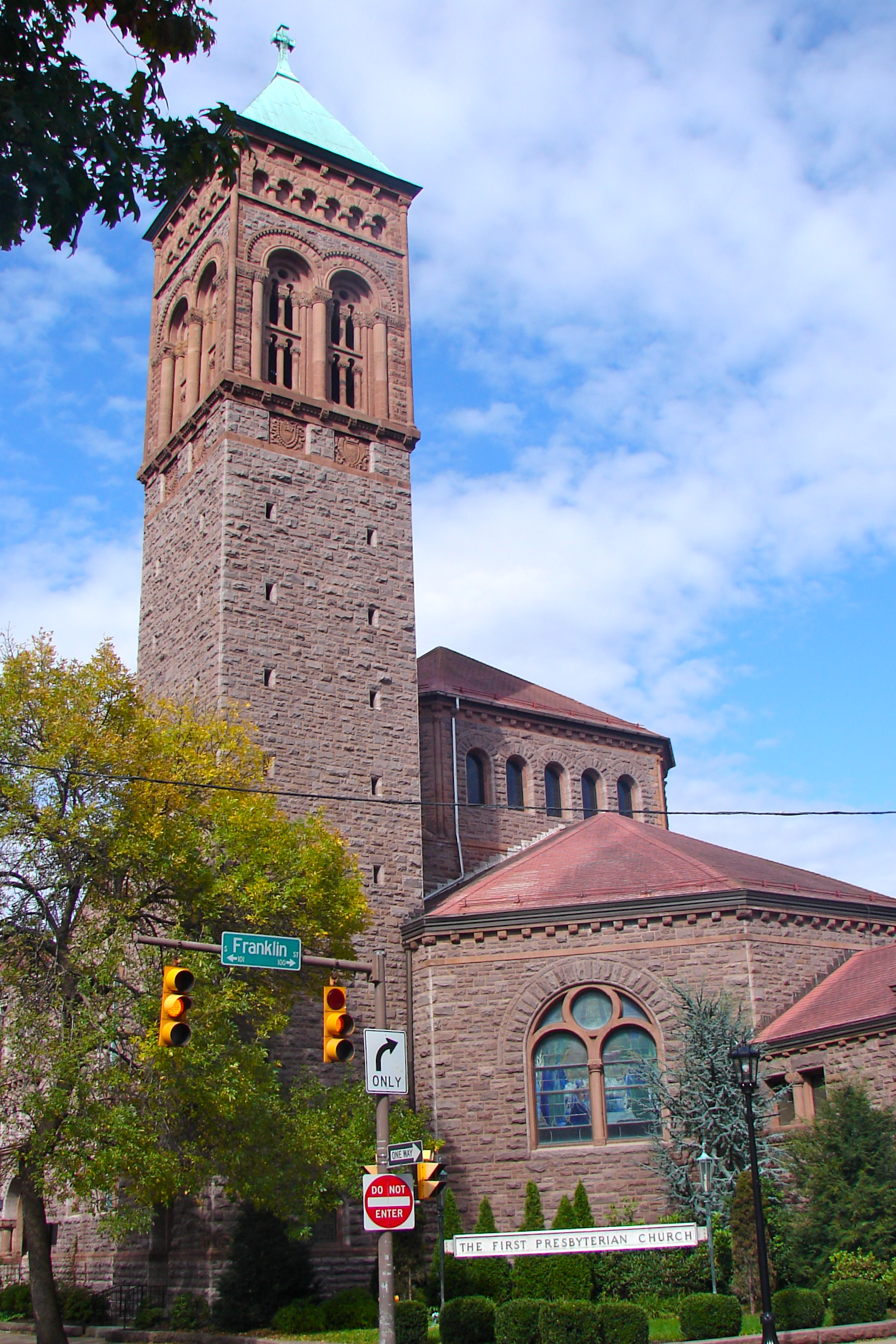
First Presbyterian Church
