= Wilkes-Barre, Pennsylvania =

City in Pennsylvania

- City
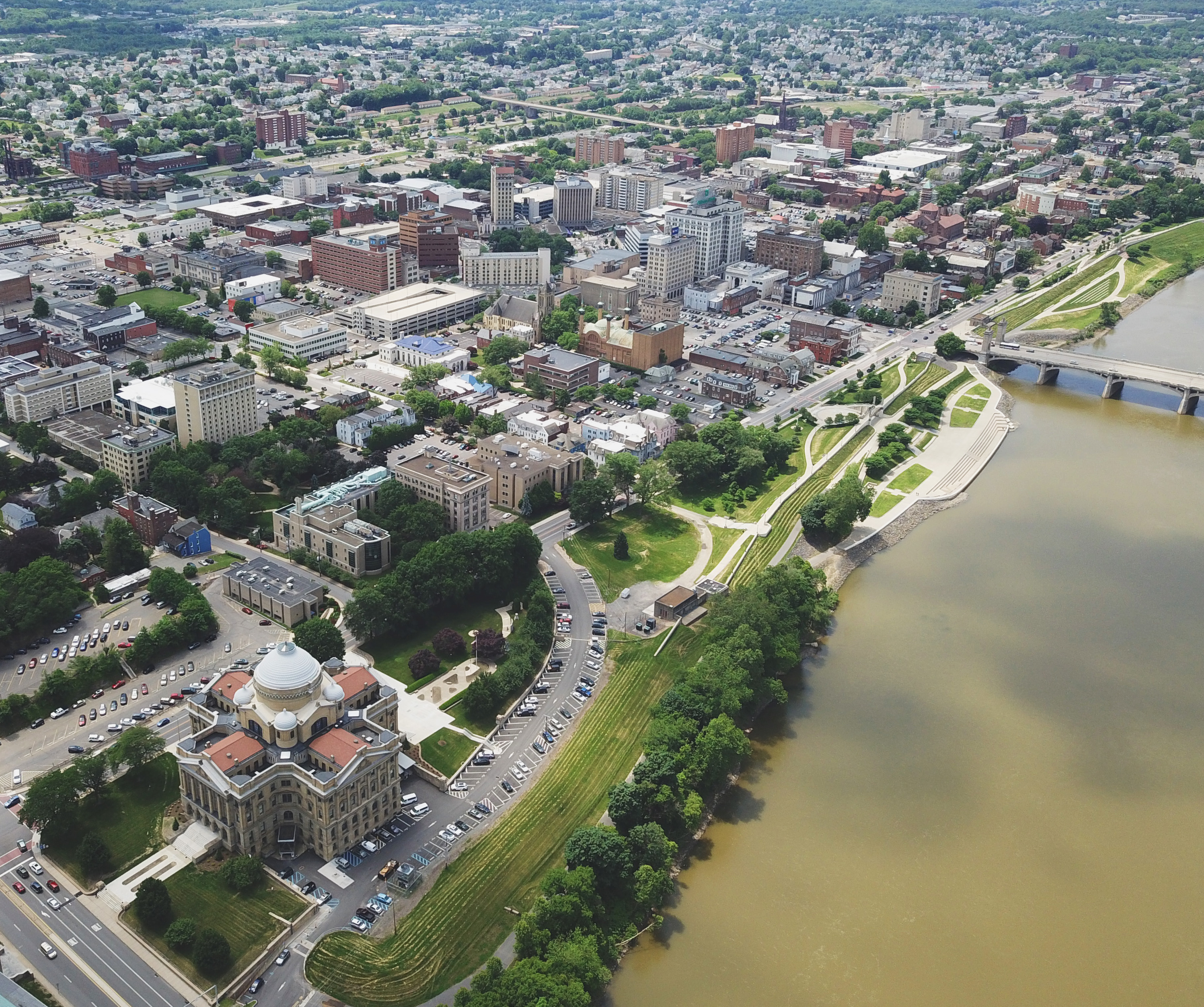
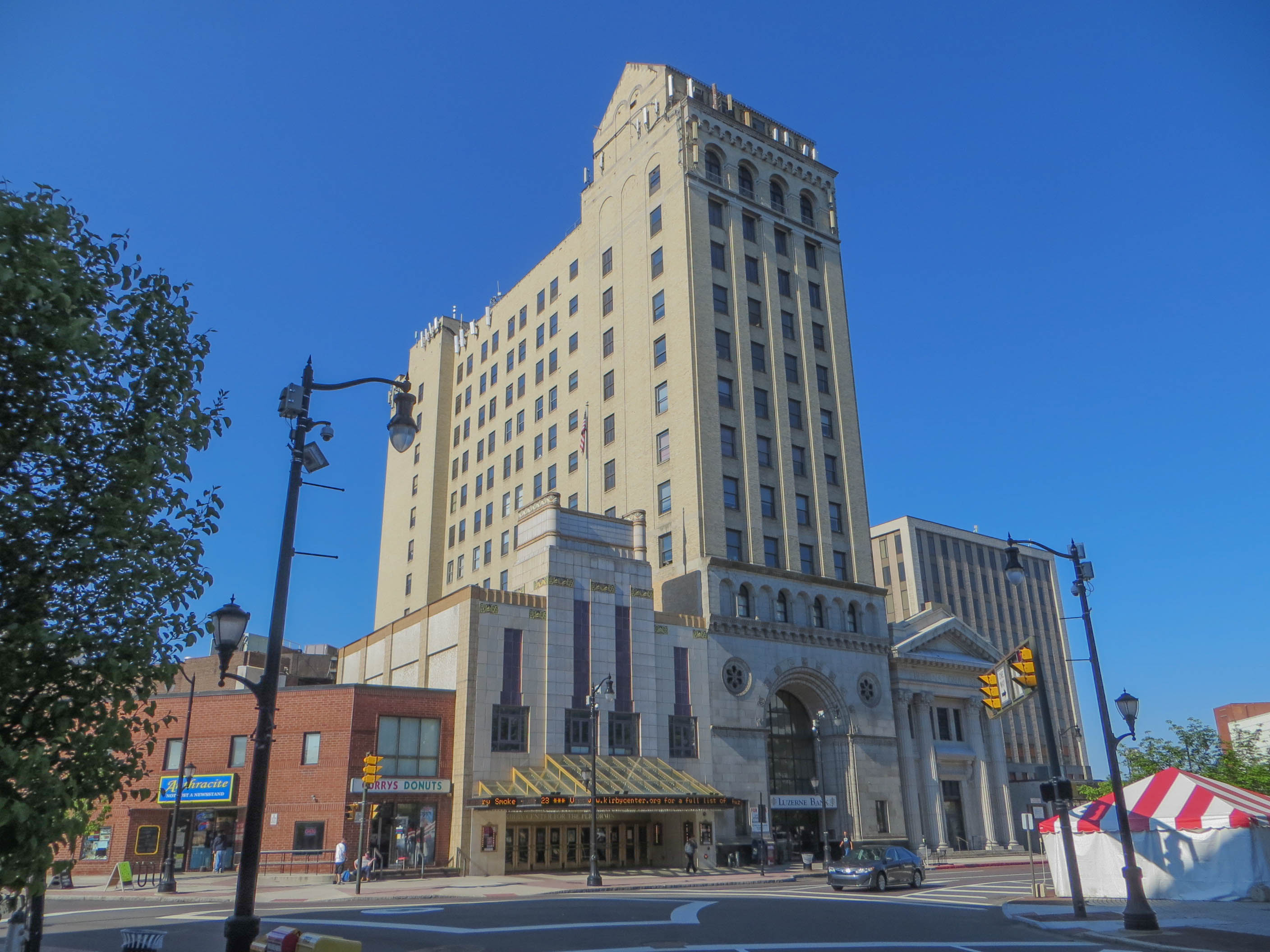
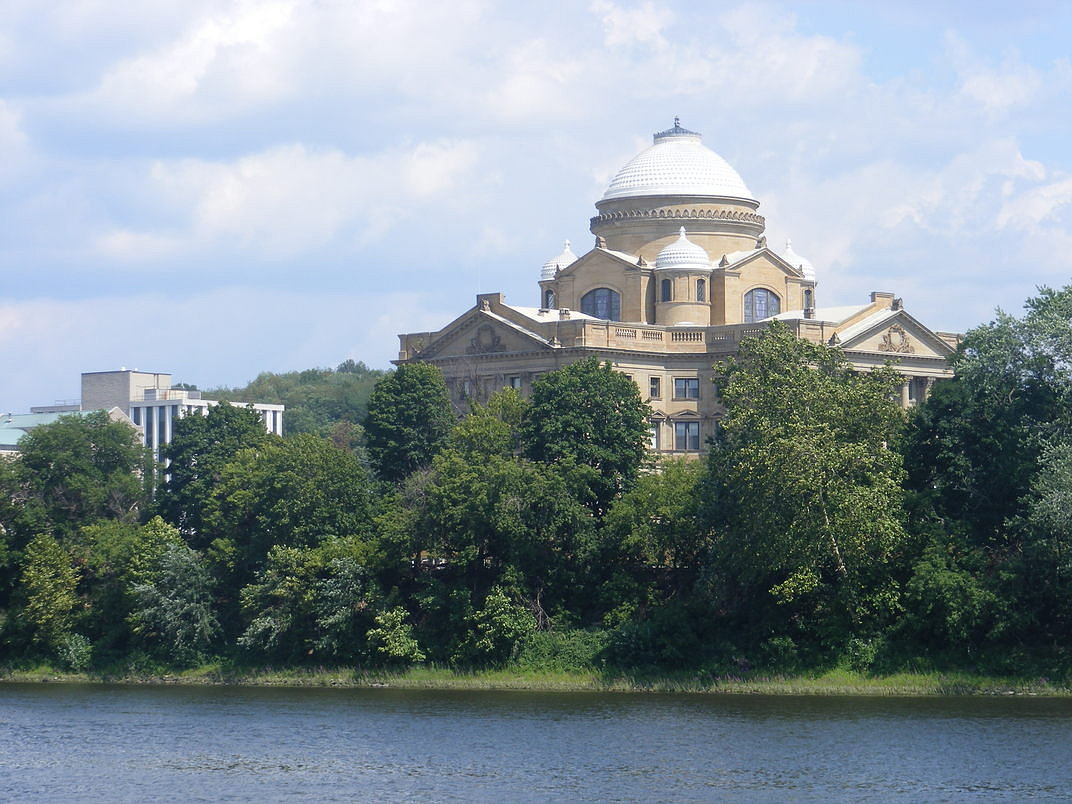
- Downtown Wilkes-Barre along the Susquehanna River Wilkes-Barre Public Square Luzerne County Courthouse

- Flag Seal
- Nicknames: The Diamond City, W-B, Coal City
- Motto: Pattern After Us
- Interactive map of Wilkes-Barre, Pennsylvania
- Location within Pennsylvania Location within the United States
- Coordinates: 41°14′40″N 75°52′41″W
- Country: United States
- State: Pennsylvania
- County: Luzerne
- Founded: 1769
- Incorporated: 1806: Borough
- 1871: City
- Named for: John Wilkes, Isaac Barré

Government
  - Type: Mayor–council
  - Body: Wilkes-Barre City Council
  - Mayor: George Brown (D)

Area
  - City: 7.19 sq mi (18.63 km^{2})
  - Land: 6.85 sq mi (17.74 km^{2})
  - Water: 0.35 sq mi (0.90 km^{2})
- Elevation: 520 ft (160 m)

Population (2020)
  - City: 44,328
  - Estimate (2025): 44,523 ▲
  - Density: 6,472.9/sq mi (2,499.19/km^{2})
  - Urban: 401,884 (US: 100th)
  - Metro: 562,037
- Time zone: UTC−5 (EST)
  - Summer (DST): UTC−4 (EDT)
- ZIP Codes: 18701–18703, 18705, 18706, 18710, 18711, 18762, 18764–18767, 18769, 18773
- Area code: 570 and 272
- FIPS code: 42-85152
- Website: wilkes-barre.city

Wilkes-Barre (/ˈwɪlksbɛər(i)/ WILKS-bair(-ee) or /ˈwɪlksbɑːr/ WILKS-bar) is a city in Pennsylvania, which functions as both the administrative hub and the primary population center of Luzerne County. Located along the Susquehanna River in Northeastern Pennsylvania, it had an estimated population of 44,523 in 2025. It is part of the Wyoming Valley metropolitan area, which includes five cities and more than 40 boroughs forming a contiguous urban corridor with an estimated 574,000 residents.

Wilkes-Barre is surrounded by the Pocono Mountains to the east, the Endless Mountains to the north and west, and the Lehigh Valley to the south. The city was founded in 1769, incorporated as a borough in 1806, and re-incorporated as a city in 1869. It experienced significant growth in the 19th century due to the development of nearby anthracite coal mines and a large influx of immigrant labor. As its industry continued to expand into the 20th century, the population peaked at over 86,000 in 1930.

Following World War II, the city's economy declined due to the collapse of industry and the 1959 Knox Mine disaster, which rendered much of the region's coal mining infrastructure unusable. In the 21st century, the city's population is approximately half its 1930 peak, but it remains the largest city in Luzerne County and the 11th-largest city in Pennsylvania. Wilkes-Barre is located 49 miles (79 km) north-northwest of Allentown, 97 miles (156 km) north-northwest of Philadelphia, and 106 miles (171 km) west-northwest of New York City.

== History ==
=== Before 1700 ===
For thousands of years, nomadic bands of hunter-gatherers used the Wilkes-Barre area for hunting, fishing, foraging, and toolmaking. Numerous artifacts from the Archaic period (about 8000–1200 BC), including stone spear points, net weights, and scrapers have been found in the area. Pottery and arrowheads from the Early and Middle Woodland periods (c. 1200 BC–950 AD) have also been found. In the Late Woodland period (c. 950–1550 AD), horticulture was adopted and more permanent settlements were established in the Wyoming Valley.

=== 18th century ===
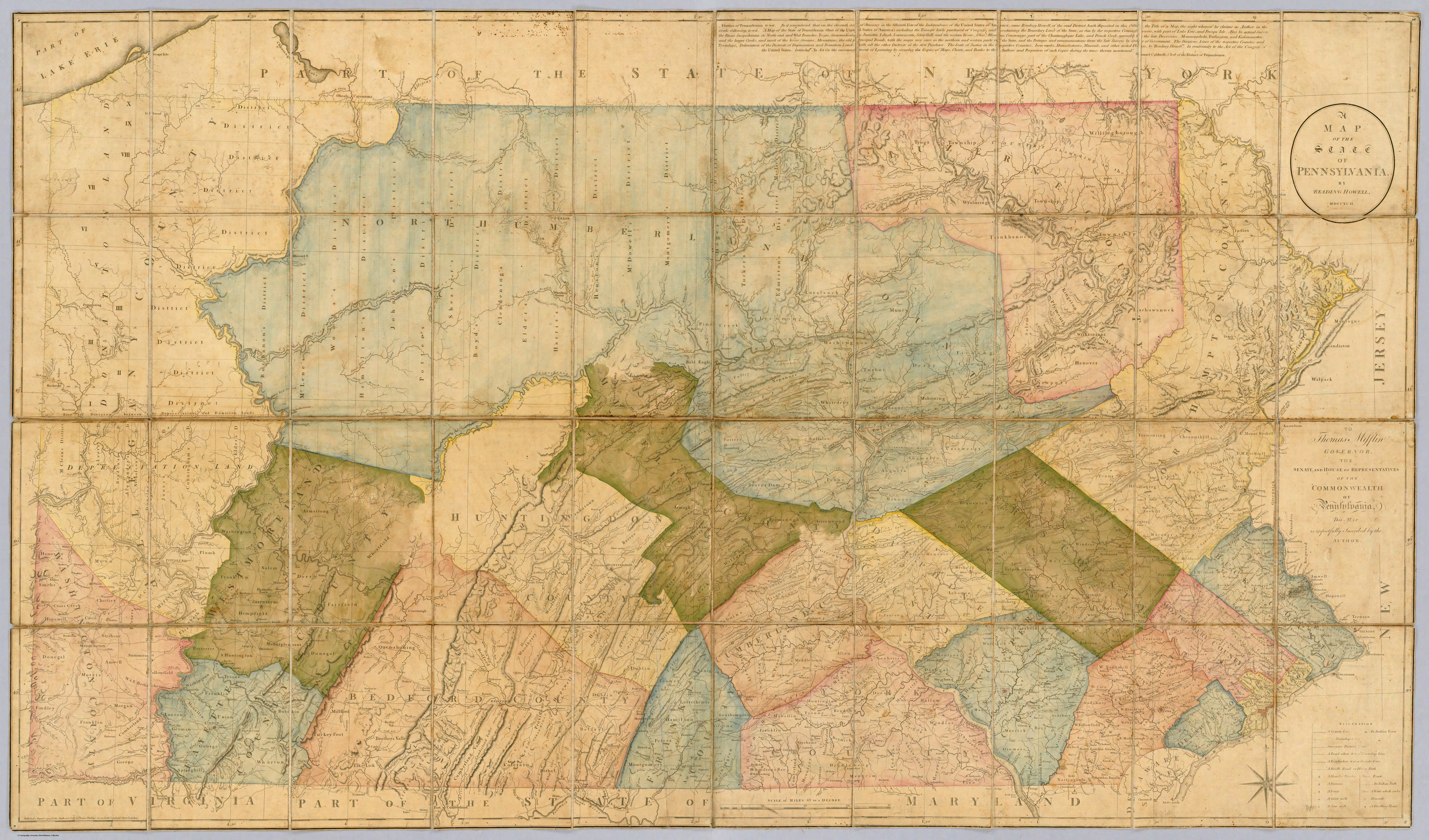
A 1792 map of Pennsylvania with Wilkes-Barre visible in the northeast; at the time, Luzerne County occupied a vast portion of Northeastern Pennsylvania

During the eighteenth century, refugee communities of Lenape, Shawnee, Conoy, Nanticoke, and Mahican settled in the Wyoming Valley. Moravian missionaries began visiting the region and working among these communities in the 1740s. In 1753, the Susquehanna Company was founded in Connecticut for settling the Wyoming Valley in present-day Pennsylvania. Connecticut succeeded in purchasing the land from the Native Americans; however, Pennsylvania already claimed the very same territory through a purchase they made in 1736. In 1762, roughly two hundred Connecticut settlers (Yankees) established a settlement near Mill Creek. They planted wheat and constructed log cabins. The Yankees returned to New England for the winter.

The Connecticut settlers returned in the spring of 1763 with their families and additional supplies. A party of Iroquois also visited the area with the dual purpose of turning the Lenape tribe against the colonists and killing Teedyuscung, a local Lenape chief. On April 19, 1763, the residence of the chief, along with several others, was set ablaze. Chief Teedyuscung perished in the inferno. The Iroquois let the Lenape believe that this atrocity was committed by the settlers. As a result, the Lenape attacked the colonists on October 15, 1763, killing thirty settlers and taking several others as prisoners. Those who managed to escape fled back to New England. The Lenape then burned what was left of the settlement.

In 1769, the Yankees returned to the Wyoming Valley. Five townships were established by Connecticut. Each one was five square miles and divided amongst forty settlers. Wilkes-Barre Township was one of the original townships; it was named in honor of John Wilkes and Isaac Barré—two British members of Parliament who supported colonial America. Pennsylvanians (Pennamites) also arrived in the valley that same year.

The Connecticut settlers established Fort Durkee, which was named in honor of their leader, Colonel Durkee. This was immediately followed by the Pennamite-Yankee War—a series of skirmishes between Pennsylvanian and Connecticut settlers. The land changed hands several times between the two groups. The Congress of the Confederation was asked to resolve the matter. With the Decree of Trenton, on December 30, 1782, the confederation government officially decided that the region belonged to Pennsylvania, and the Wyoming Valley became part of Northumberland County.

During the Revolutionary War two forts were built at Wilkes-Barre. Fort Wilkes-Barre was completed in 1778 but was abandoned and burned later that year following the Battle of Wyoming. Fort Wyoming (later renamed Fort Dickinson) was constructed when the Continental Army reoccupied the Wyoming Valley and served as a staging area for the Sullivan Expedition in 1779.

After the Revolutionary War the State of Pennsylvania ruled that the Connecticut settlers were not citizens of Pennsylvania. They were not permitted to vote and were ordered to give up their property claims. In May 1784, armed men from Pennsylvania force-marched the Connecticut settlers away from the valley. By November, the Yankees returned with a greater force. They captured and destroyed Fort Dickinson in Wilkes-Barre. With that victory, a new state (which was separate from both Connecticut and Pennsylvania) was proposed. The new state was to be named Westmoreland. To ensure that they did not lose the land, Pennsylvania's state government negotiated a compromise with the Connecticut (Yankee) settlers. The Yankee settlers would become citizens of Pennsylvania and their property claims would be restored prior to the Decree of Trenton. As part of the compromise, Pennsylvania would establish a new county in Northeastern Pennsylvania. The Yankees agreed to the terms.

On September 25, 1786, the Pennsylvania General Assembly passed a resolution which created Luzerne County. It was formed from a section of Northumberland County and named after Chevalier de la Luzerne, a French soldier and diplomat during the 18th century. Wilkes-Barre became the seat of government for the new territory. This resolution ended the idea of creating a new state.

In 1797, several decades after the community's founding, Louis Philippe, later the King of France from 1830 to 1848, stayed in Wilkes-Barre while traveling to the French Asylum settlement.

=== 19th century ===
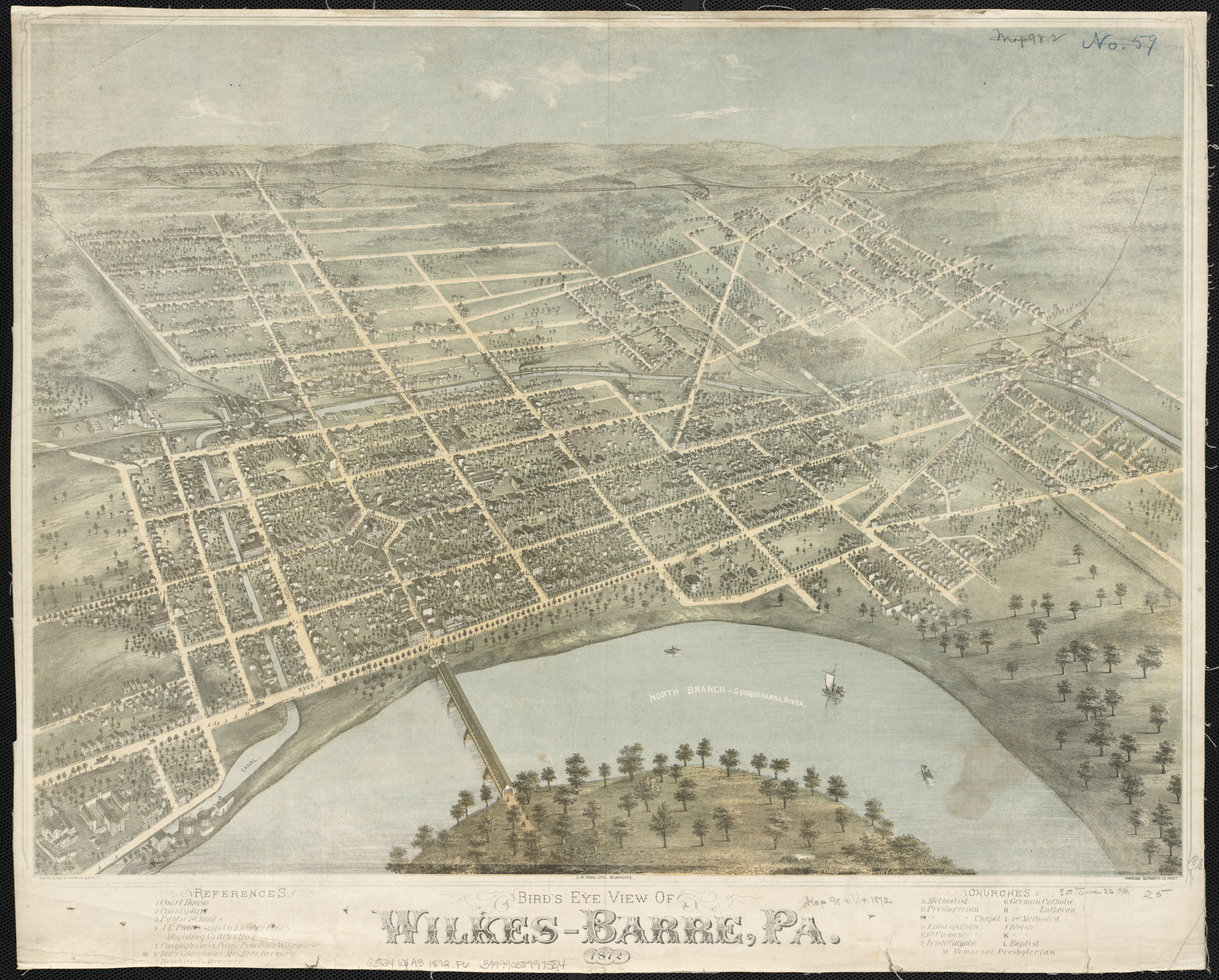
An 1872 panoramic map of Wilkes-Barre

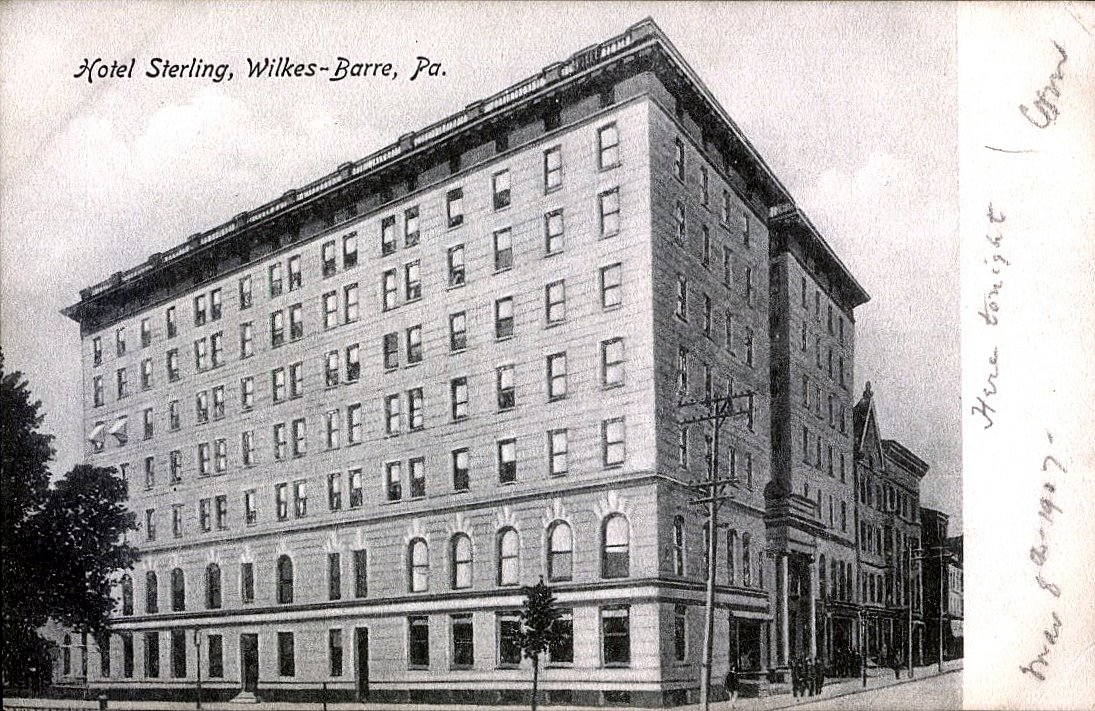
The Hotel Sterling, built in 1897

Wilkes-Barre's population skyrocketed due to the discovery of anthracite coal in the 19th century. In 1808, Judge Jesse Fell of Wilkes-Barre discovered a solution to ignite anthracite with the usage of an iron grate; it allowed for the coal to light and burn more easily. This invention increased the popularity of anthracite as a fuel source. This led to the expansion of the coal industry in Northeastern Pennsylvania; Wilkes-Barre was nicknamed "The Diamond City" due to its high productivity of mining coal. The growing demand for coal as a domestic heat source resulted in changes to patterns of immigration to Wilkes-Barre in the 19th century. The Pennsylvania guide, compiled by the Writers' Program of the Works Progress Administration in 1940, noted that:

Until 1870 all immigration was from the north of Europe, with the Irish predominating. Then mine operators sent representatives to central and southern Europe to induce peasants to come to the American coal fields. Many of the older workers consequently were supplanted by newcomers willing to work for low wages, and bitter conflicts followed. The cleavage along national lines, however, gave to Wilkes-Barre such picturesque sections as Five Points, now East End, where a crowd of miners used to gather nightly on the steps of Mackin Brothers' Store, a scene described by Con Carbon in a popular ballad of the 1890s:

And once thy peaceful tide
The Far Downs and Connaught men
Fight, and then make up again,
Dutch and Scotch and English men—
All like chickens in a pen.
The powder smoke does be so thick,
You could not cut it with a pick,
The smell of gas would make you sick
In front of Mackin's store.

— Federal Writers'Project, "Part II: Cities and Towns", Pennsylvania: A Guide to the Keystone State (1940)

Throughout the 1800s, canals and railroads were constructed to aid in the mining and transportation of coal. Hundreds of thousands of immigrants flocked to the city; they were seeking jobs in the numerous mines and collieries that sprang up throughout the region. In 1806, Wilkes-Barre Borough was formed from a segment of Wilkes-Barre Township; it was later incorporated as a city in 1871. This was the direct result of the population boom. At its peak, Wilkes-Barre had a population of over 86,000 in the 1930s and 40s.

New industries were established and the Vulcan Iron Works was a well-known manufacturer of railway locomotives from 1849 to 1954. During Wilkes-Barre's reign as an industrial and economic force in America, several major companies and franchises became based in the city, such as Woolworth's, Sterling Hotels, Miner's Bank, Bell Telephone, Luzerne National Bank, and Stegmaier.

Even though the overall economy was doing very well, the city was still prone to natural disasters. Besides frequent flooding from the Susquehanna River, Wilkes-Barre also endured a devastating F3 tornado on August 19, 1890. The twister killed 16 people, injured 50, damaged or destroyed 260 buildings, and cost at least $240,000 (in 1890 money).

=== 20th century ===
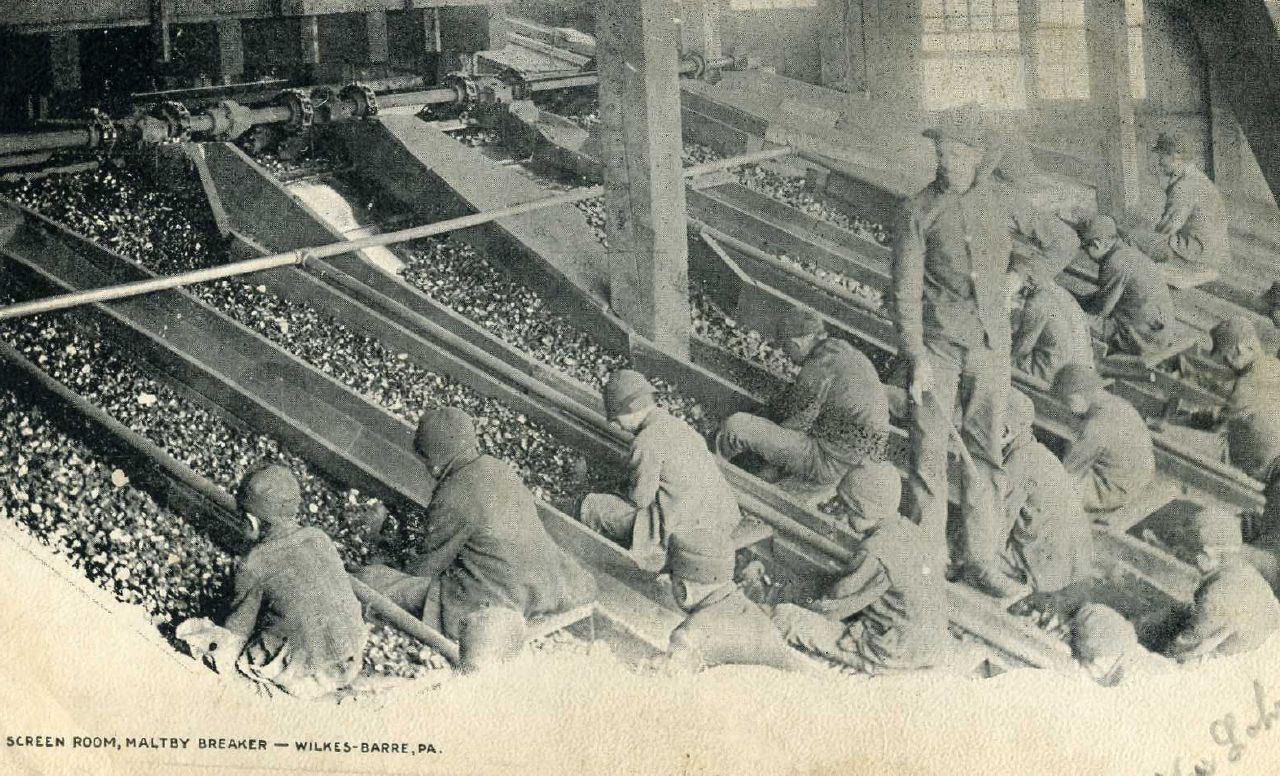
Children working in Wilkes-Barre's coal industry in 1906 prior to the implementation of federal child labor laws

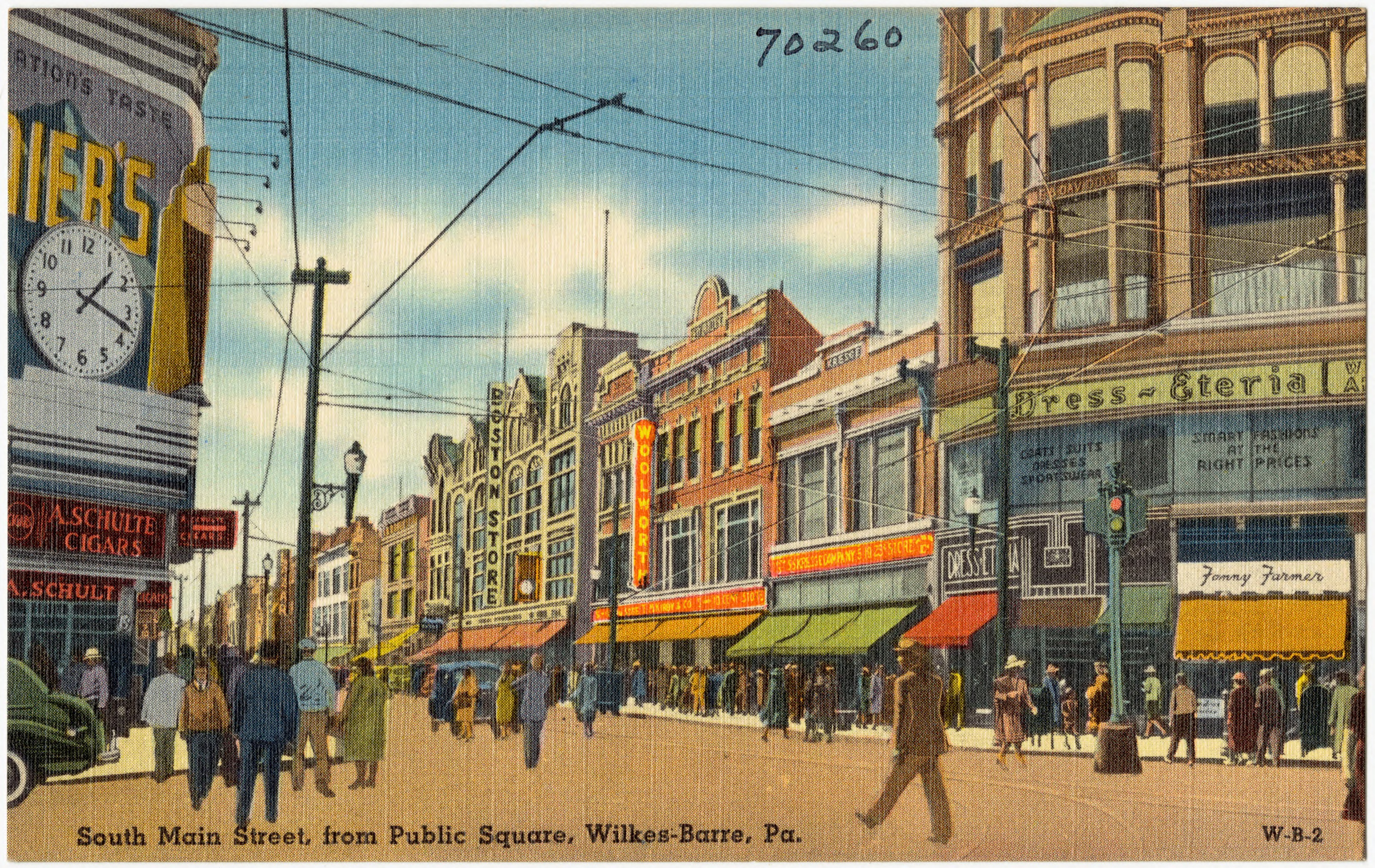
South Main Street in Wilkes-Barre, c. 1940

Wilkes-Barre is located within Pennsylvania's Coal Region. The anthracite coal mining industry, and its extensive use of child labor in the early 20th century, was one of the industries targeted by the National Child Labor Committee and its hired photographer, Lewis Hine. Many of Hine's subjects were photographed in the mines and coal fields near Wilkes-Barre. The impact of the Hine photographs led to the enactment of child labor laws across the country.

The coal industry continued despite several disasters, including an explosion at Wilkes-Barre's Baltimore Colliery in 1919, which killed 92 miners. The industry declined when the United States switched to other energy sources, and most coal operations had left Wilkes-Barre by the end of World War II. The 1959 Knox Mine Disaster, resulting in the flooding of numerous mines, marked the end of large-scale coal mining in the area. Industrial restructuring also caused the city to lose jobs and begin a decades-long decline.

In 1926, Planters Peanuts Company was founded in Wilkes-Barre by two Italian immigrants. The company maintained its headquarters in the city until 1961. In 1929, baseball player Babe Ruth hit one of the longest home runs in history at Artillery Park in Wilkes-Barre.

On November 8, 1972, Wilkes-Barre became the birthplace of modern cable television programming when Home Box Office (HBO) launched over the city's Teleservice Cable system (now Service Electric Cable). Around 365 Teleservice subscribers were the first to receive the premium cable service when it commenced broadcasts. As local ordinances prohibiting direct-to-cable telecasts of theatrical feature films prevented Time-Life from launching HBO over its New York City-based Sterling Manhattan cable franchise, the company initially sought an agreement with Teleservice to launch it on the provider's Allentown system; possible television blackout conflicts for HBO-televised NBA games, as Allentown was located within the Philadelphia 76ers's 75-mile [121 km] blackout radius, resulted in Teleservice electing to offer it on its Wilkes-Barre system instead.

Wilkes-Barre became the site of a shooting spree on September 25, 1982. George Emil Banks killed 13 people and wounded one. Banks was deemed incompetent to be executed and died on November 2, 2025, of natural causes.

==== Flooding ====
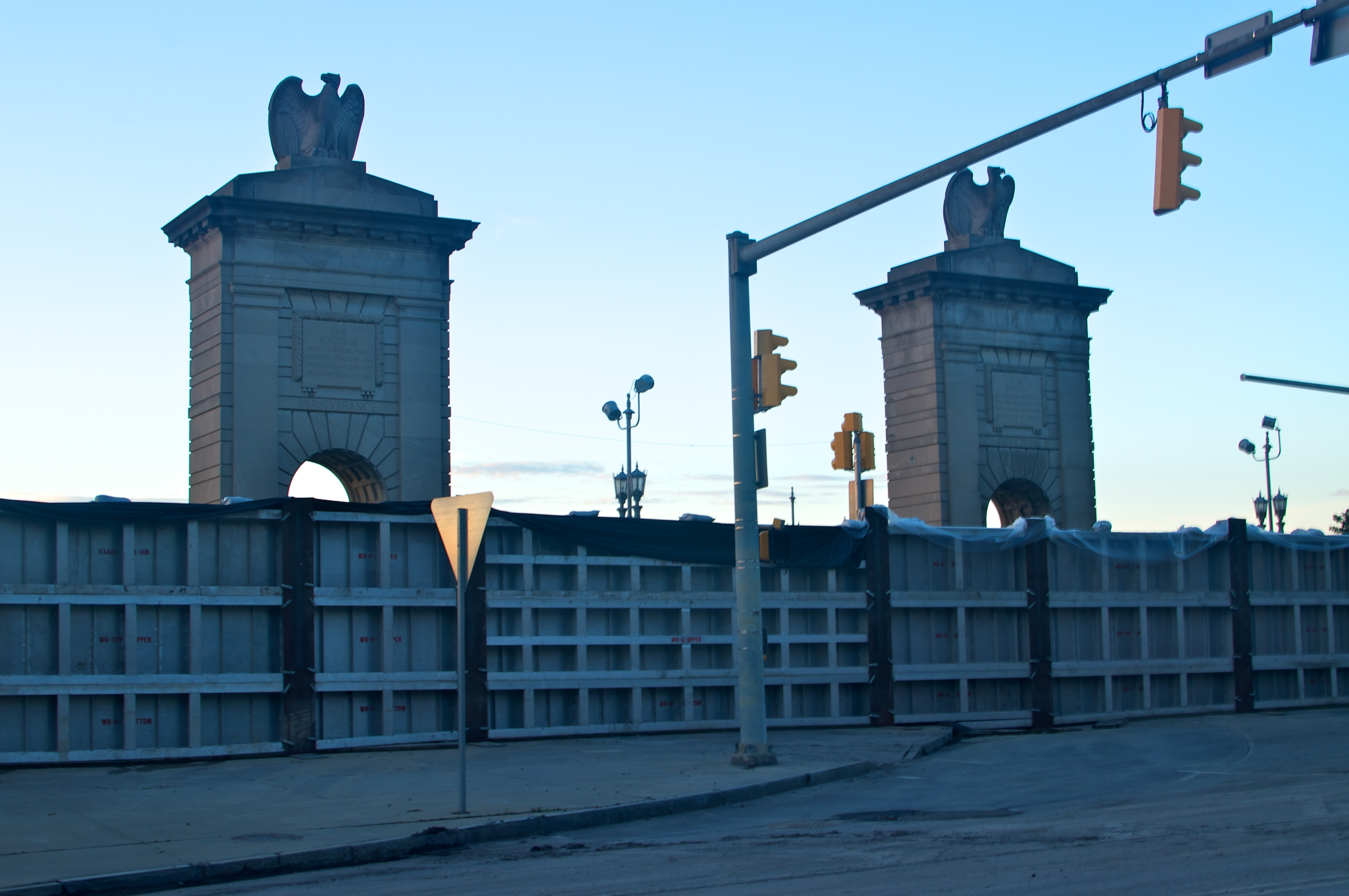
Temporary flood walls on Market Street in Wilkes-Barre in September 2011

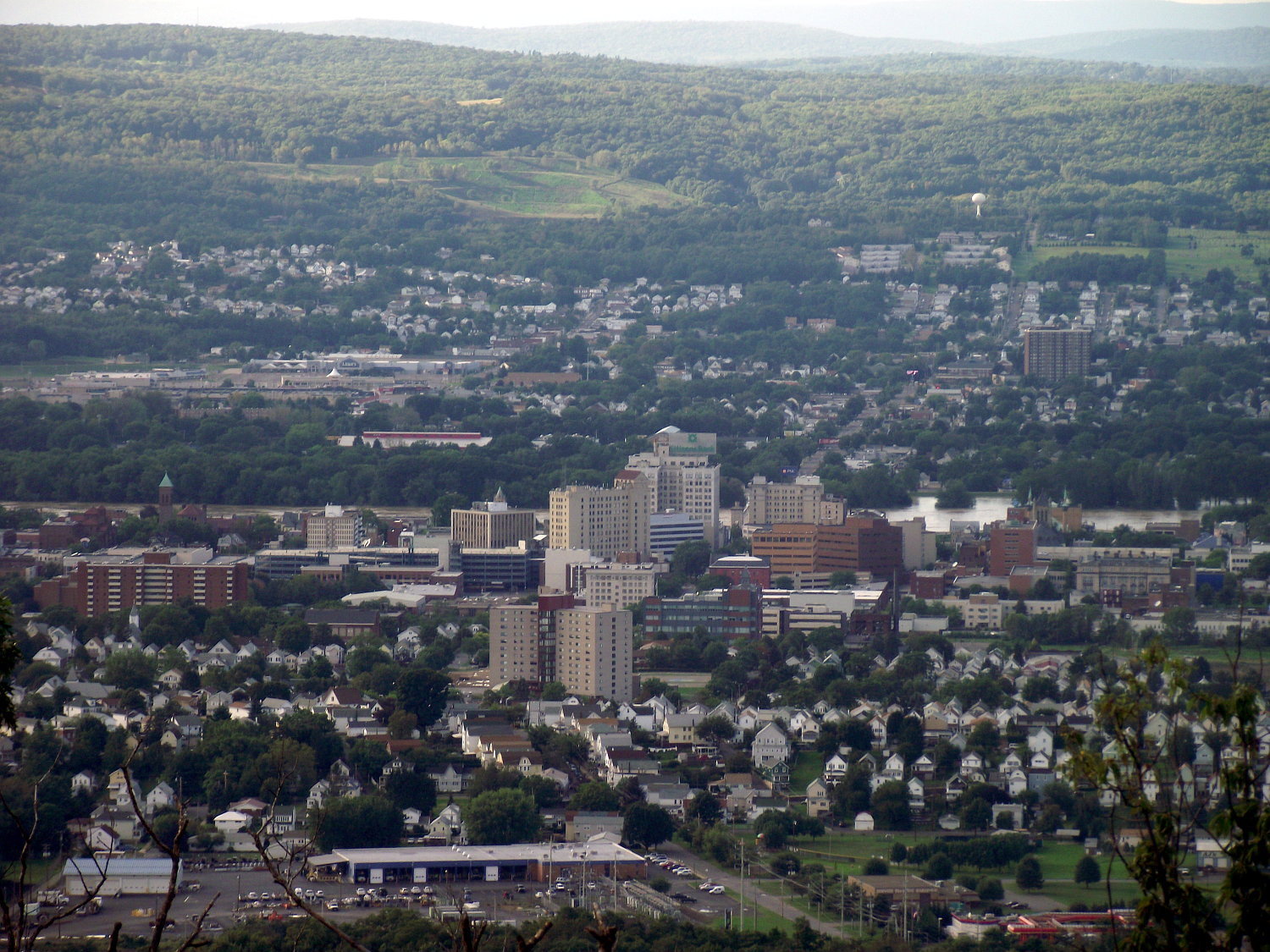
Wilkes-Barre during the September 2011 flood

Manufacturing and retail remained Wilkes-Barre's strongest industries, but the city's economy took a major blow from Tropical Storm Agnes in 1972. The storm pushed the Susquehanna River to a height of nearly 41 feet (12 m), four feet above the city's levees, flooding downtown with nine feet of water. A total of 128 deaths were attributed to the storm. Most drowning deaths were caused by people trapped in their cars. Almost 400,000 homes and businesses were destroyed and 220,000 Pennsylvanians were left homeless (as were hundreds of thousands in other states). Damage was estimated to be $2.1 billion in Pennsylvania alone. President Richard Nixon sent aid to the area, after flying over in his helicopter on his way to his Camp David retreat (on June 24, 1972).

Throughout the 1970s and 1980s, Wilkes-Barre attempted to prevent the damage from storms as intense as Agnes by building a levee system that rises 41 feet (12 m); completed in January 2003, the network of levees cost roughly $250 million. It has successfully resisted other threatening floods in 1996, 2004, and 2006. The Army Corps of Engineers has praised the quality of the levees. In 2006, the city made the front page of national newspapers when 200,000 residents were told to evacuate in the wake of flooding that was forecast to reach levels near that of 1972, though the flooding fell short of predictions.

In late August 2011, Hurricane Irene, centered off the New Jersey coast, caused the Susquehanna River to rise to flood level, but there was no cause for alarm. Then, from September 6 to 8, heavy rains from the inland remnants of Tropical Storm Lee and Hurricane Katia offshore funneled heavy rain over the Wyoming Valley and into the Susquehanna River watershed. The Susquehanna swelled to record levels across the state. In Wilkes-Barre, it crested on September 9 at an all-time record of 42.66 feet (13 m), nearly 2 feet (0.6 m) higher than water levels reached during Hurricane Agnes in 1972. The levees protected Wilkes-Barre, but nearby boroughs did not escape, as West Pittston, Plymouth, and parts of Plains Township were affected by extreme flooding.

=== 21st century ===
==== Revitalization and construction ====
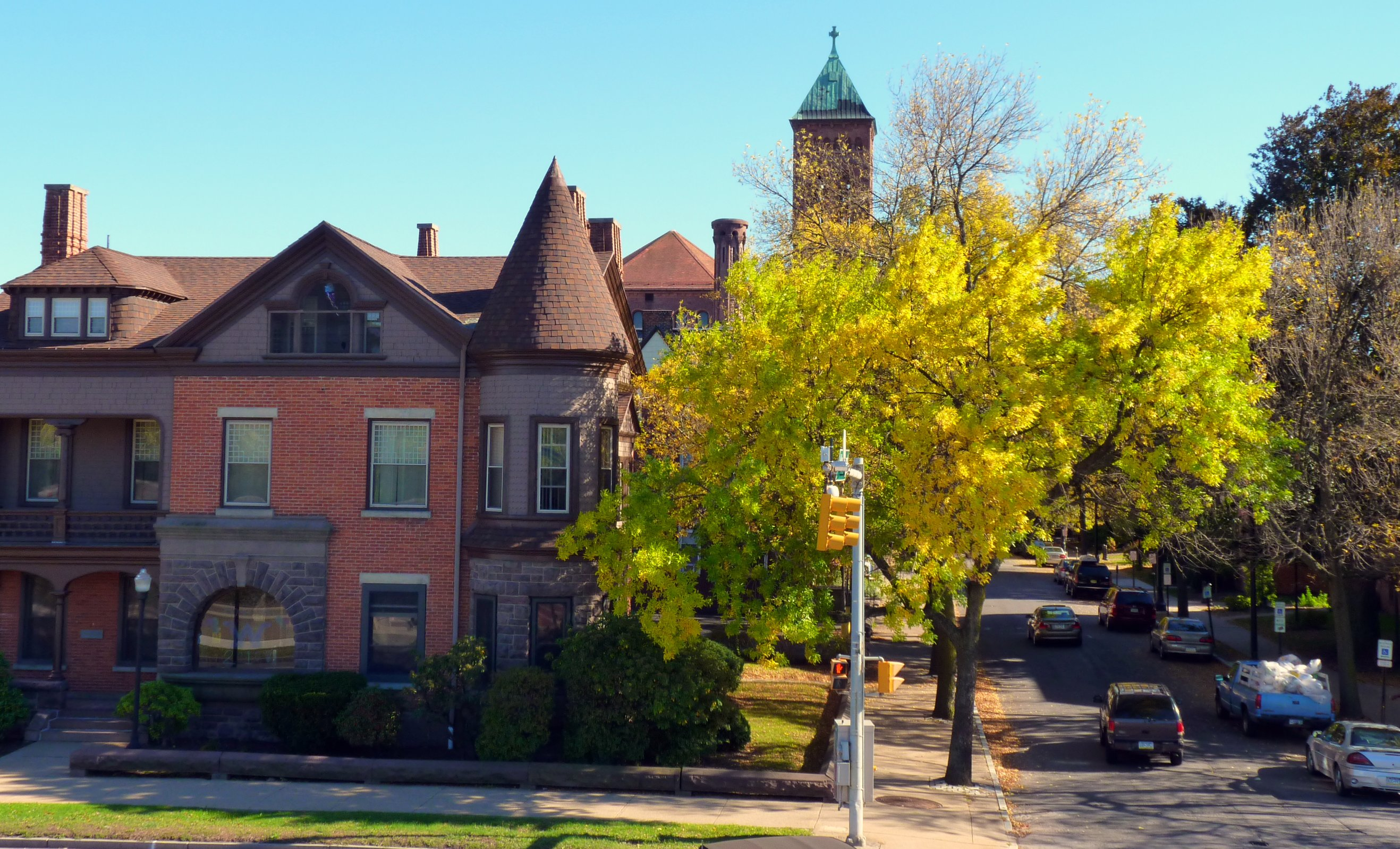
Weiss Hall, built in 1895, is now part of the River Street Historic District

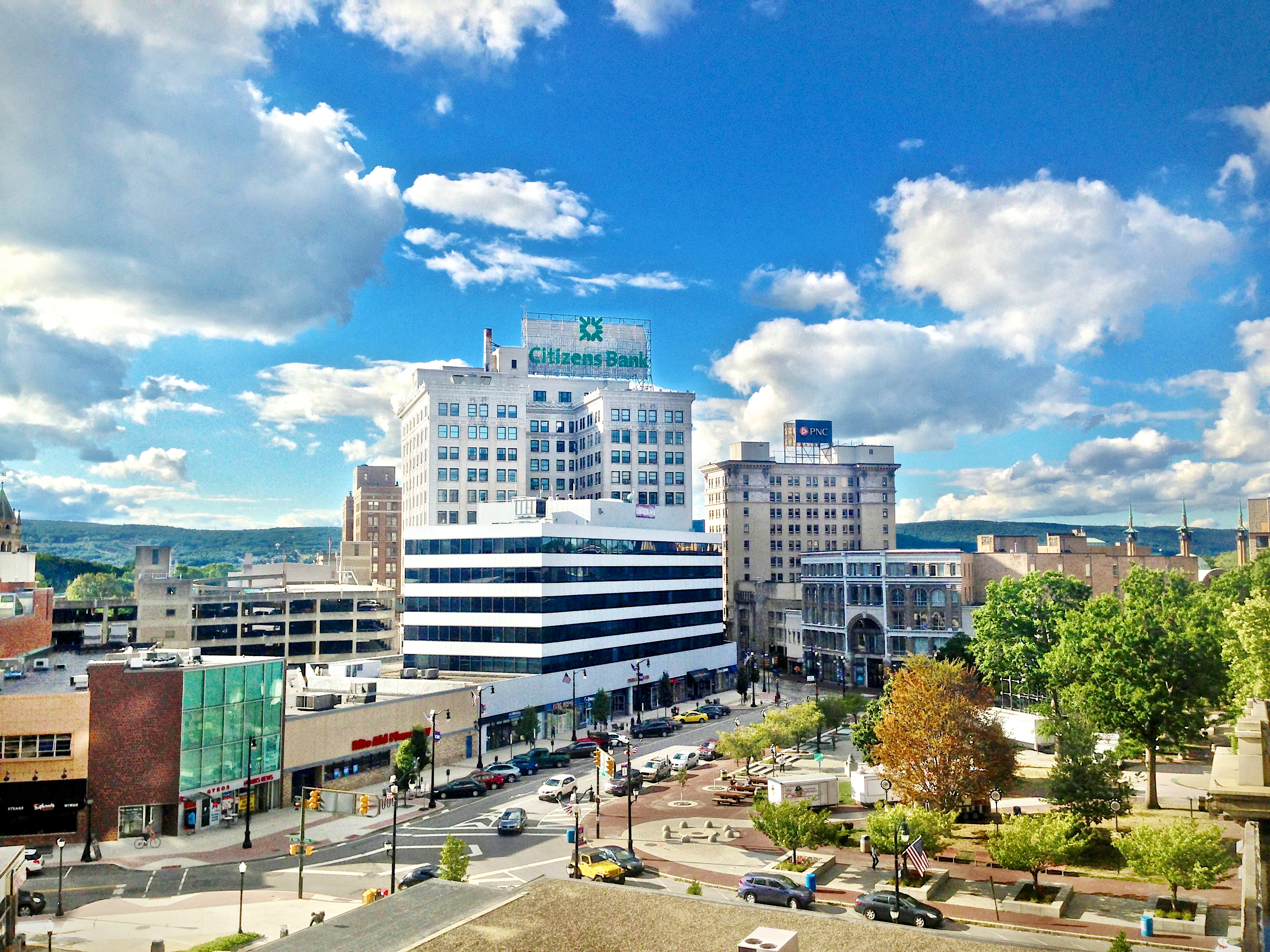
The public square in Wilkes-Barre

On June 9, 2005, Thomas M. Leighton, the city's mayor, unveiled his "I believe..." campaign for Wilkes-Barre, which was intended to boost the city's spirits. Construction began on a planned downtown theatre complex, which had a grand opening on June 30, 2006. Renovation of the landmark Hotel Sterling was being pursued by CityVest, a nonprofit developer. The expansion of Wilkes University and King's College took place. Also, the canopy and matching street lights in Public Square and across downtown were removed; they were replaced by new green lampposts.

Wilkes-Barre celebrated its 200th anniversary in 2006. Several events, including a Beach Boys concert, were planned but canceled due to extremely heavy rains. Most of the city's population was ordered to evacuate on June 28, 2006, and the Bicentennial celebration was postponed to Labor Day weekend.

The Riverfront revitalization project (River Common), broke ground in 2007 and was completed in early 2010. It has made the riverfront accessible to the public. The area also has a new amphitheater for live performances and improved access through ramps and sidewalks. Fountains and color-changing lights have been added underneath two bridges which carry pedestrian traffic across the normally-open levee. The project stretches approximately four blocks from the Luzerne County Courthouse to the intersection of South River Street and West South Street. The River Common has since hosted concerts and charity events.

Since completion of the River Common, additional improvements to city infrastructure have been progressing. New crosswalks have been installed downtown, including signage emphasizing that pedestrians have the right-of-way. The completion of the James F. Conahan Intermodal Transportation Facility has added parking and relocated Luzerne County buses from their former Public Square staging sites. This has reduced traffic congestion around the square. Private carrier Martz offers coach bus service from the terminal as well.

The widening and realignment of Coal Street, a major road connecting Wilkes-Barre City with Wilkes-Barre Township, was completed in 2012. The new Coal Street provides four lanes over the original two lanes, making travel between the highly commercial Wilkes-Barre Township and the city much easier. In 2013, Hotel Sterling was demolished due to flood damage in the hotel's basement (which compromised the building's integrity). As of today, several buildings are in the process of being constructed on the site of the former hotel.

== Geography ==
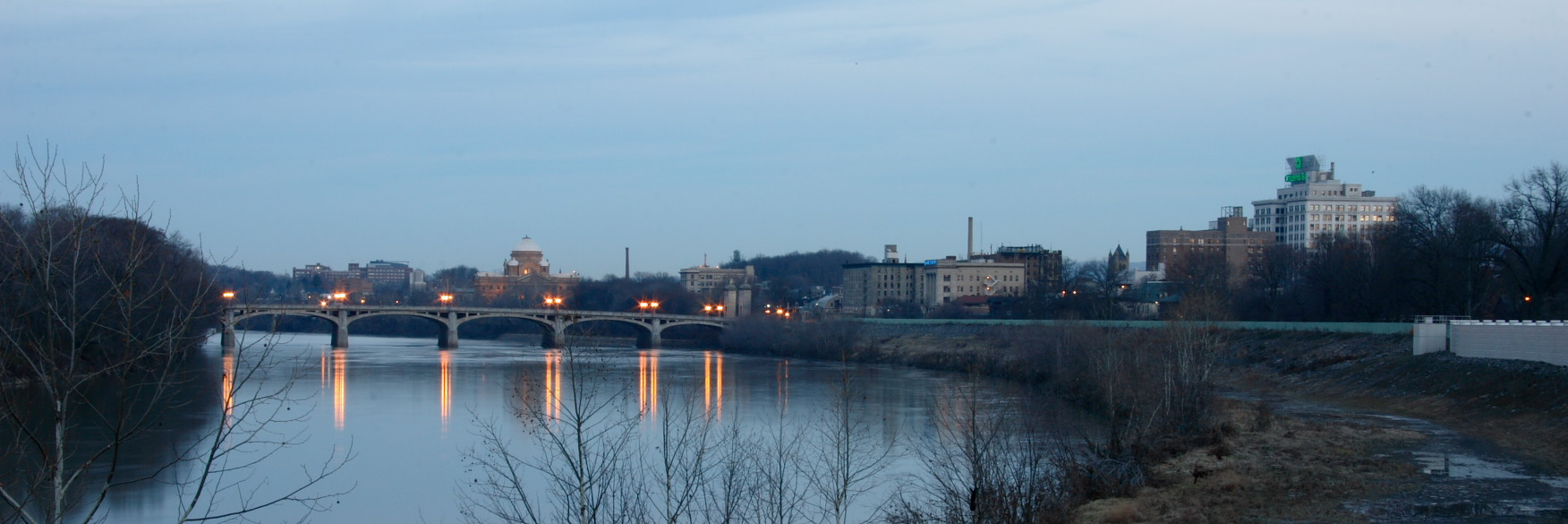
The Susquehanna River and Wilkes-Barre

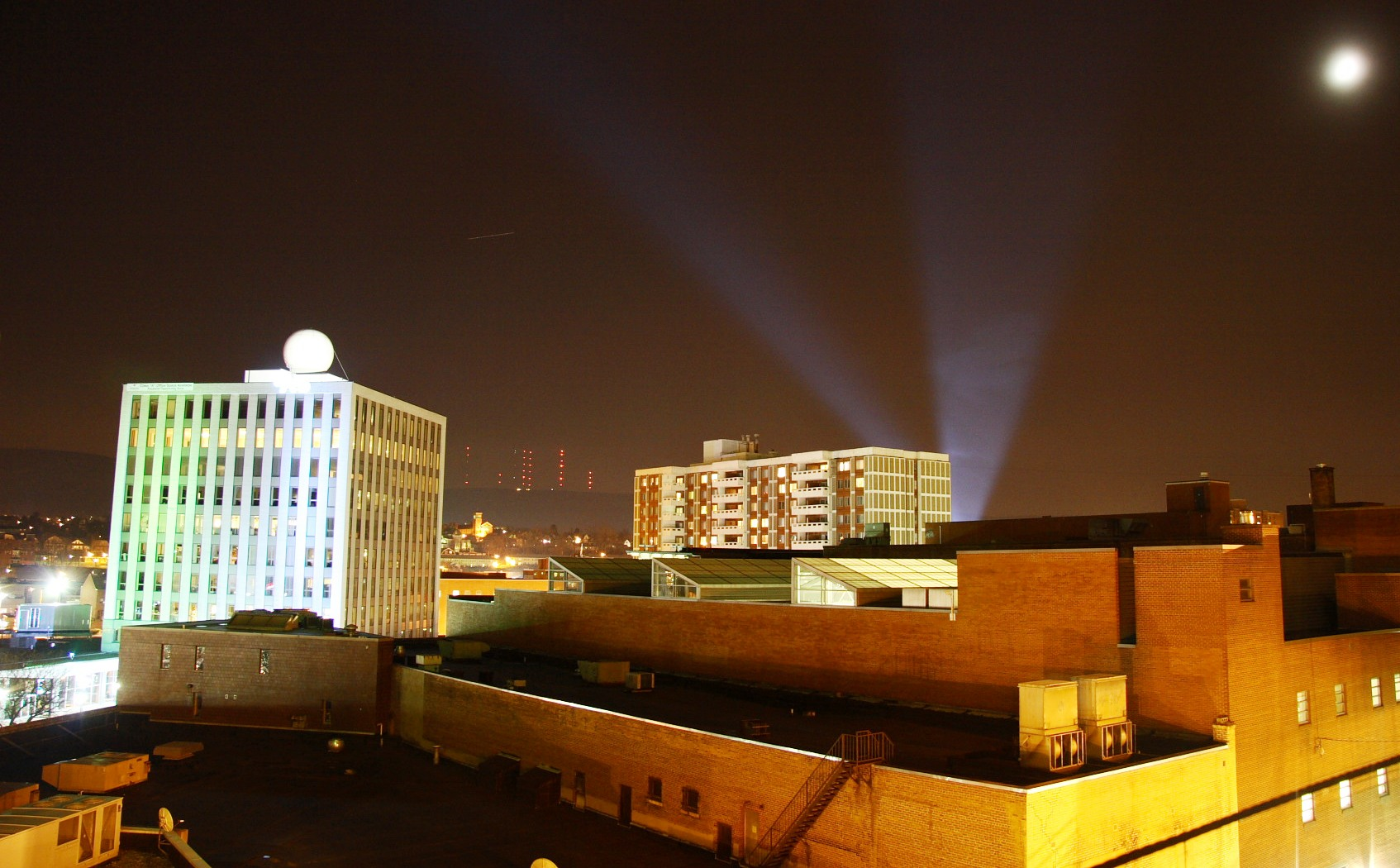
Downtown Wilkes-Barre at night

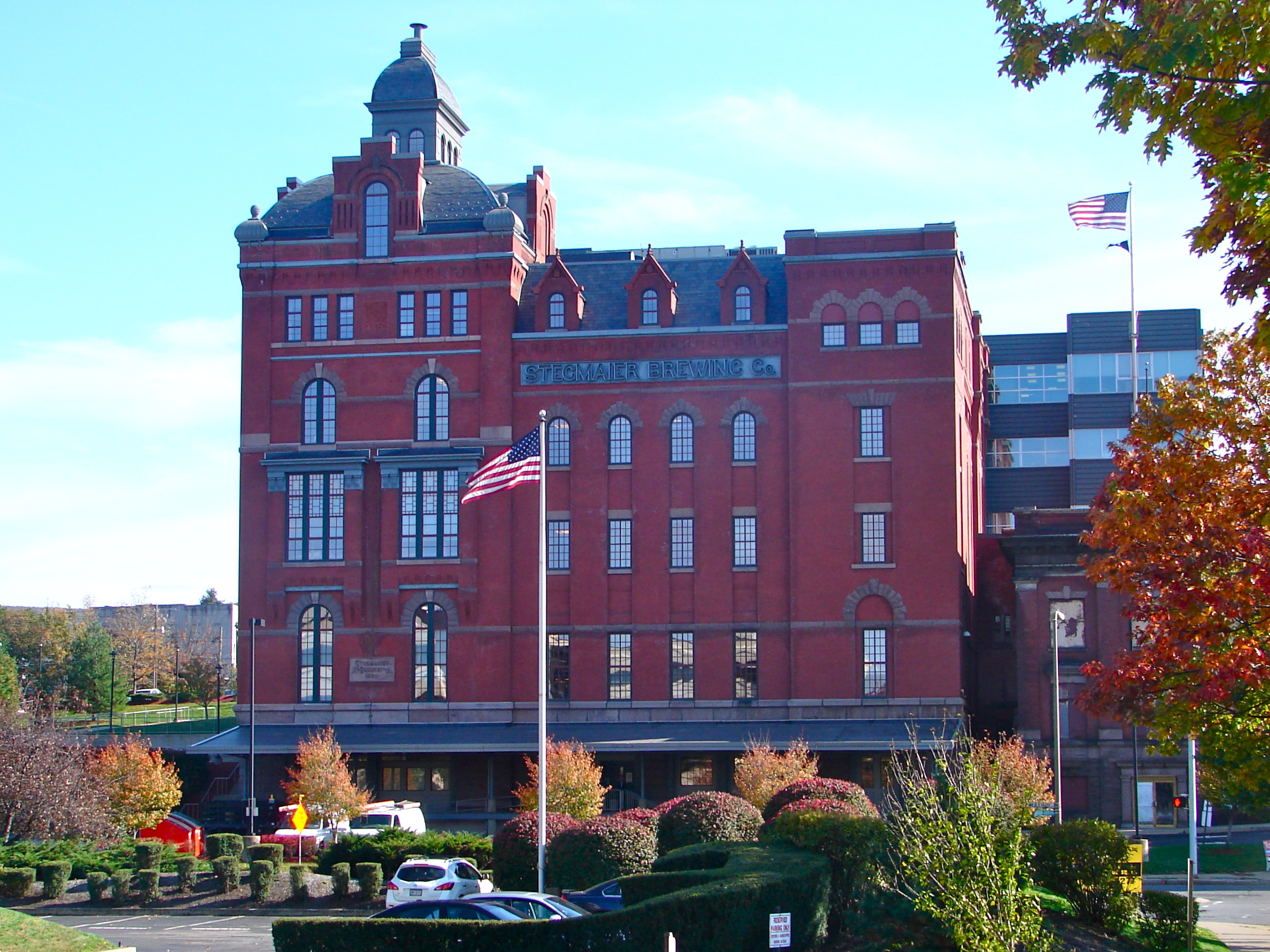
The Stegmaier Federal Building

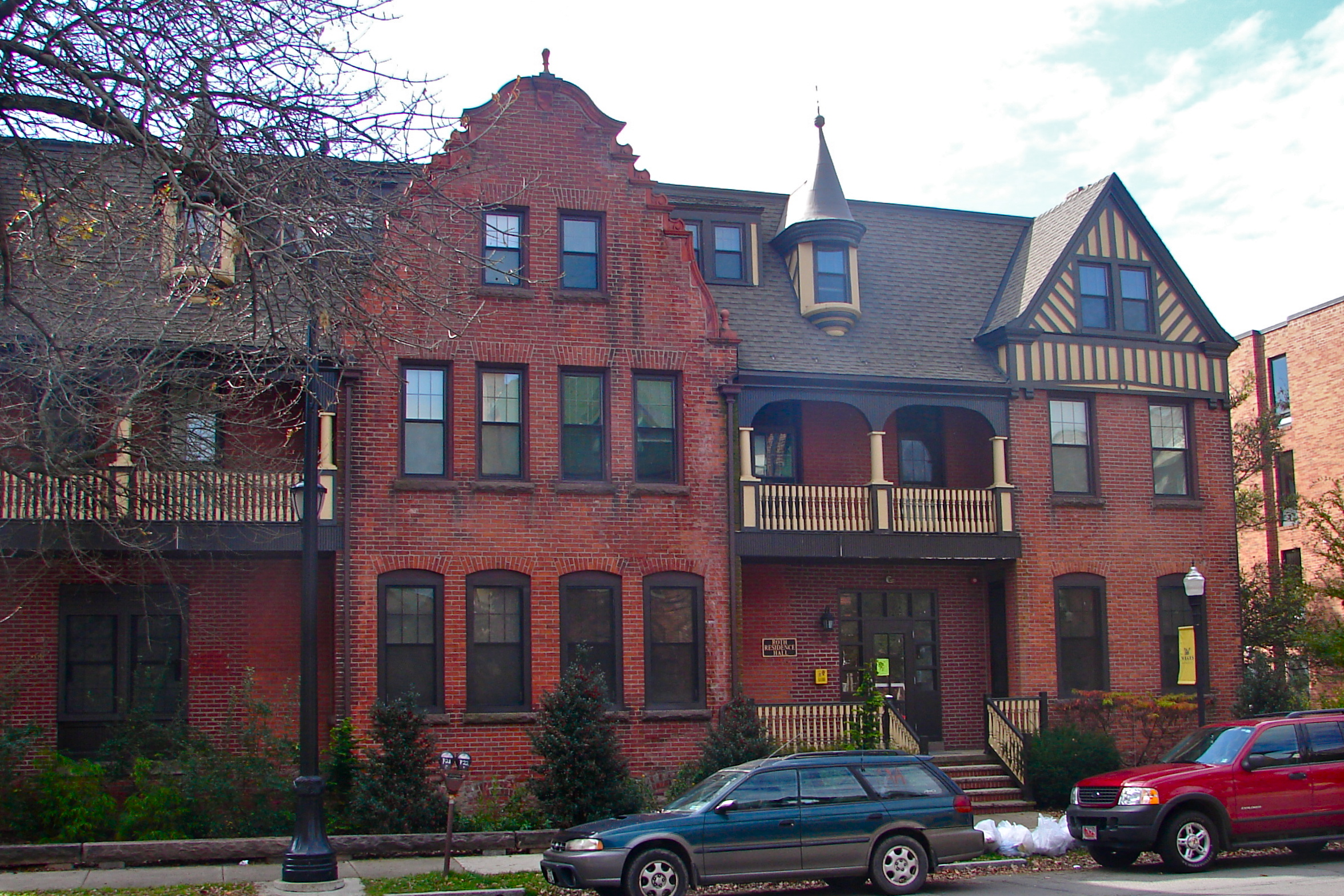
Roth Residence Hall

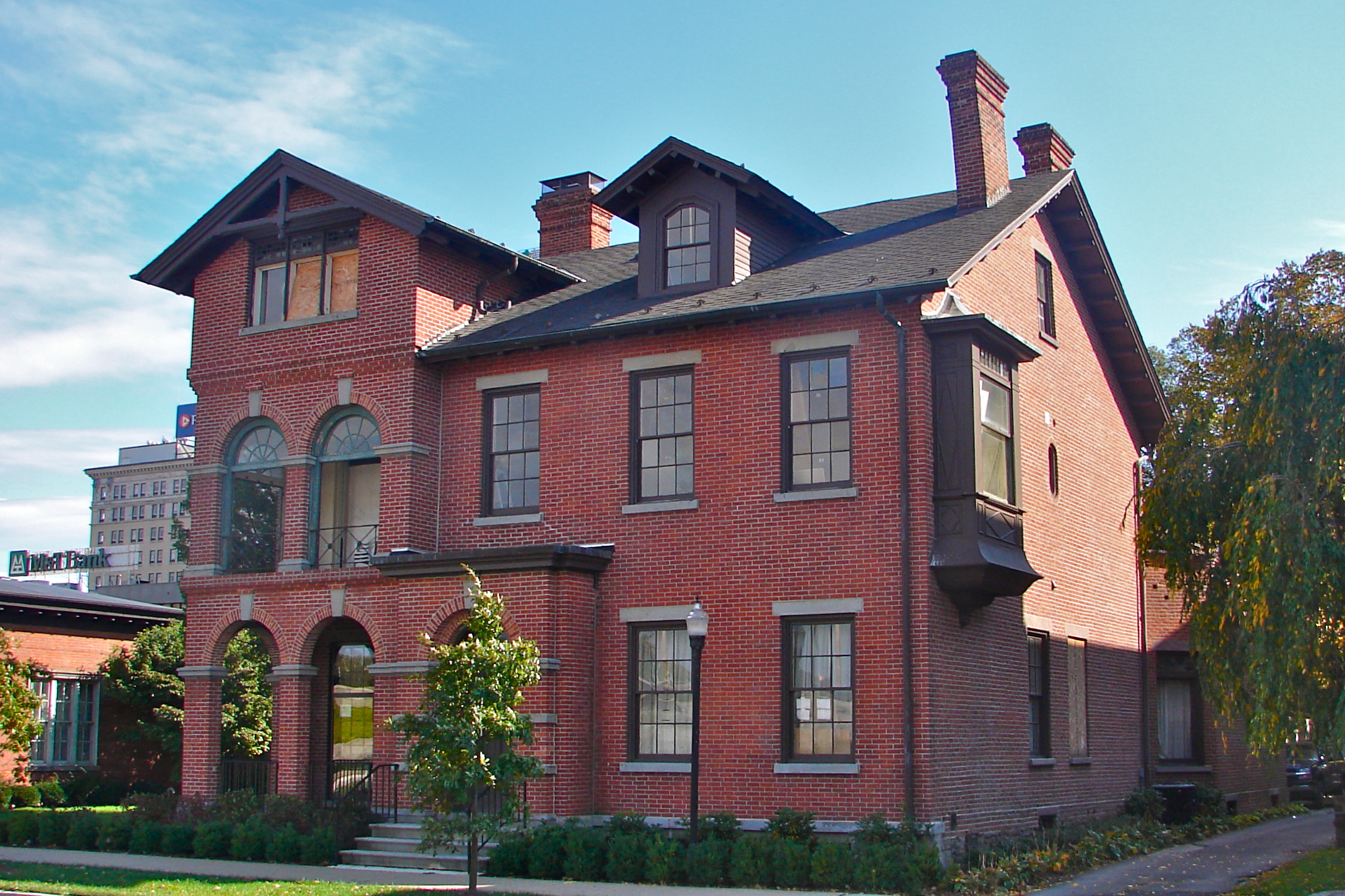
McClintock Hall, built in 1841

According to the U.S. Census Bureau, the city has a total area of 7.2 square miles (19 km^{2}), of which 6.8 square miles (18 km^{2}) is land and 0.3 square miles (0.78 km^{2}), or 4.60%, is water. The city is bordered by the Susquehanna River to the west. Most of Downtown is located on a wide floodplain. Floodwalls were constructed to protect a large percentage of the city. The elevation of the downtown area is about 550 feet (170 m) above sea level. As you travel inland, away from the river, the elevation rises. Wilkes-Barre Mountain is a physical barrier southeast of the city.

The contiguous network of 5 cities and more than 40 boroughs all built in a straight line in Northeastern Pennsylvania's urban area act culturally and logistically as one continuous city, so while the city of Wilkes-Barre itself is a smaller town, the larger unofficial city of Scranton/Wilkes-Barre contains nearly half a million residents in roughly 200 square miles.

Wilkes-Barre is located approximately 63 miles (101 km) northwest of Allentown, and 113 miles (182 km) northwest of Philadelphia. Wilkes-Barre and the surrounding Wyoming Valley are framed by the Pocono Mountains to the east, the Endless Mountains to the north and west, and the Lehigh Valley to the south. The Susquehanna River flows through the center of the valley and defines the northwestern border of the city.

=== Neighborhoods ===
- Central City
- North End
- Parsons
- Miners' Mills
- East End
- Heights
- Mayflower
- South Wilkes-Barre
- Goose Island
- Rolling Mill Hill
- Iron Triangle

=== Climate ===
Under the Köppen climate classification, Wilkes-Barre falls within either a hot-summer humid continental climate (Dfa) if the 0 °C (32 °F) isotherm is used or a humid subtropical climate (Cfa) if the −3 °C (27 °F) isotherm is used. Summers are hot and winters are moderately cold with wide variations in temperature. Winters are cold with a January average of 28.0 °F (−2.2 °C). The surrounding mountains have an influence on the climate (including both precipitation and temperatures), leading to wide variations within a short distance. On average, temperatures below 0 °F (−17.8 °C) are infrequent, occurring 2.5 days per year, and there are 34.9 days where the maximum temperature remains below 32 °F (0.0 °C). The average annual snowfall is 45.1 inches (115 cm) during the winter (in which severe snowstorms are rare). However, when snowstorms do occur, they can disrupt normal routines for several days.

Summers are warm with a July average of 73.7 °F (23.2 °C). In an average summer, temperatures exceeding 90 °F (32.2 °C) occur on 11.7 days and but rarely exceed 100 °F (37.8 °C). Spring and fall are unpredictable with temperatures ranging from cold to warm (although they are usually mild). On average, Wilkes-Barre receives 38.72 inches (983 mm) of precipitation each year, which is relatively evenly distributed throughout the year (though the summer months receive more precipitation). Extreme temperatures range from −21 °F (−29.4 °C) on January 21, 1994, to 103 °F (39.4 °C) on July 9, 1936. Wilkes-Barre averages 2,303 hours of sunshine per year, ranging from a low of 96 hours in December (or 33% of possible sunshine) to 286 hours in July (or 62% of possible sunshine).

The hardiness zone is 6b except in downtown and other areas near the river which are 7a. The city is significantly warmer than the W-B/Scranton Airport due to the airport's higher latitude and elevation.

Climate data for Wilkes-Barre/Scranton International Airport, Pennsylvania (1991–2020 normals, (Note: Mean monthly maxima and minima (i.e. the expected highest and lowest temperature readings at any point during the year or given month) calculated based on data at said location from 1991 to 2010.) extremes 1901–present (Note: Official records for Avoca/Wilkes-Barre–Scranton kept at downtown Scranton from January 1901 to 17 April 1955 and at Wilkes-Barre/Scranton International Airport since 18 April 1955.))
Month	Jan	Feb	Mar	Apr	May	Jun	Jul	Aug	Sep	Oct	Nov	Dec	Year
Record high °F (°C)	69 (21)	76 (24)	85 (29)	93 (34)	93 (34)	99 (37)	103 (39)	102 (39)	100 (38)	91 (33)	81 (27)	71 (22)	103 (39)
Mean maximum °F (°C)	57.7 (14.3)	57.0 (13.9)	68.0 (20.0)	81.3 (27.4)	88.0 (31.1)	90.5 (32.5)	92.8 (33.8)	90.5 (32.5)	87.6 (30.9)	78.6 (25.9)	69.1 (20.6)	59.6 (15.3)	94.3 (34.6)
Mean daily maximum °F (°C)	35.7 (2.1)	38.8 (3.8)	47.6 (8.7)	61.1 (16.2)	72.2 (22.3)	79.9 (26.6)	84.6 (29.2)	82.4 (28.0)	75.1 (23.9)	63.1 (17.3)	51.2 (10.7)	40.3 (4.6)	61.0 (16.1)
Daily mean °F (°C)	28.0 (−2.2)	30.3 (−0.9)	38.3 (3.5)	50.2 (10.1)	60.9 (16.1)	69.0 (20.6)	73.7 (23.2)	71.8 (22.1)	64.6 (18.1)	53.2 (11.8)	42.7 (5.9)	33.3 (0.7)	51.3 (10.7)
Mean daily minimum °F (°C)	20.3 (−6.5)	21.9 (−5.6)	28.9 (−1.7)	39.3 (4.1)	49.6 (9.8)	58.1 (14.5)	62.7 (17.1)	61.1 (16.2)	54.0 (12.2)	43.3 (6.3)	34.3 (1.3)	26.3 (−3.2)	41.7 (5.4)
Mean minimum °F (°C)	0.6 (−17.4)	3.6 (−15.8)	11.0 (−11.7)	24.7 (−4.1)	34.7 (1.5)	44.1 (6.7)	50.9 (10.5)	48.8 (9.3)	38.7 (3.7)	28.7 (−1.8)	18.0 (−7.8)	9.1 (−12.7)	−1.6 (−18.7)
Record low °F (°C)	−21 (−29)	−19 (−28)	−4 (−20)	8 (−13)	27 (−3)	34 (1)	43 (6)	38 (3)	29 (−2)	19 (−7)	5 (−15)	−13 (−25)	−21 (−29)
Average precipitation inches (mm)	2.59 (66)	2.07 (53)	2.77 (70)	3.26 (83)	3.26 (83)	3.80 (97)	3.61 (92)	3.85 (98)	4.15 (105)	3.71 (94)	2.85 (72)	2.80 (71)	38.72 (983)
Average snowfall inches (cm)	11.7 (30)	10.9 (28)	10.1 (26)	0.8 (2.0)	0.0 (0.0)	0.0 (0.0)	0.0 (0.0)	0.0 (0.0)	0.0 (0.0)	0.7 (1.8)	3.2 (8.1)	7.7 (20)	45.1 (115)
Average precipitation days (≥ 0.01 in)	12.6	11.4	11.8	12.2	12.9	12.9	11.1	11.1	10.0	10.7	10.3	12.1	139.1
Average snowy days (≥ 0.1 in)	8.7	8.4	4.8	1.0	0.0	0.0	0.0	0.0	0.0	0.3	1.7	6.3	31.2
Average relative humidity (%)	70.1	67.5	63.3	60.4	64.6	70.5	71.1	73.8	75.2	71.6	71.8	72.5	69.4
Average dew point °F (°C)	16.2 (−8.8)	17.2 (−8.2)	24.4 (−4.2)	33.1 (0.6)	45.3 (7.4)	55.9 (13.3)	60.4 (15.8)	59.9 (15.5)	53.4 (11.9)	41.4 (5.2)	32.2 (0.1)	22.3 (−5.4)	38.5 (3.6)
Mean monthly sunshine hours	130.3	143.7	185.7	210.5	246.9	269.7	285.7	257.2	200.2	173.3	104.3	95.9	2,303.4
Percentage possible sunshine	44	48	50	53	55	60	62	60	54	50	35	33	52
Source: NOAA (relative humidity and dew point 1964–1990, sun 1961–1990)

== Demographics ==
Historical population
Census	Pop.	Note	%±
1800	835		—
1810	1,225		46.7%
1820	755		−38.4%
1840	1,718		—
1850	2,723		58.5%
1860	4,253		56.2%
1870	10,174		139.2%
1880	23,339		129.4%
1890	37,718		61.6%
1900	51,721		37.1%
1910	67,105		29.7%
1920	73,833		10.0%
1930	86,626		17.3%
1940	86,236		−0.5%
1950	76,826		−10.9%
1960	63,068		−17.9%
1970	58,856		−6.7%
1980	51,551		−12.4%
1990	47,523		−7.8%
2000	43,123		−9.3%
2010	41,498		−3.8%
2020	44,328		6.8%
2025 (est.)	44,523		0.4%
U.S. Decennial Census

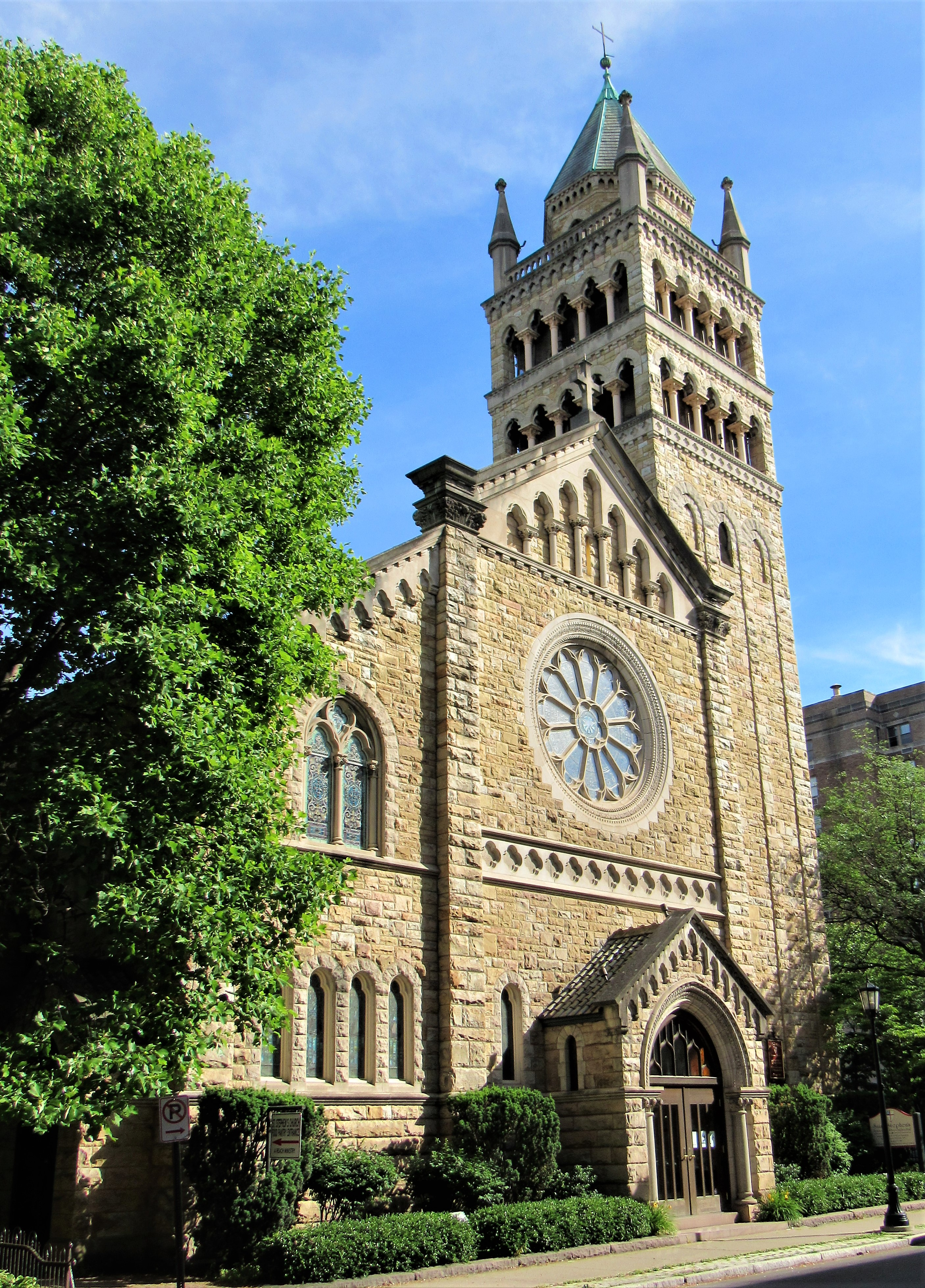
St. Stephen's Church in Wilkes-Barre

The city's population was in constant decline from the 1930s through 2010, but losses stopped that decade, and it saw growth as of 2020.

=== 2020 census ===
As of the 2020 census, Wilkes-Barre had a population of 44,328 and 17,256 households. The median age was 35.9 years; 20.4% of residents were under the age of 18 and 15.6% of residents were 65 years of age or older. For every 100 females there were 99.6 males, and for every 100 females age 18 and over there were 96.7 males age 18 and over.

Of the 17,256 households, 26.6% had children under the age of 18 living in them. Of all households, 29.1% were married-couple households, 25.4% were households with a male householder and no spouse or partner present, and 36.9% were households with a female householder and no spouse or partner present. About 38.0% of all households were made up of individuals and 14.8% had someone living alone who was 65 years of age or older.

There were 19,861 housing units, of which 13.1% were vacant. The homeowner vacancy rate was 2.0% and the rental vacancy rate was 9.7%.

100.0% of residents lived in urban areas, while 0.0% lived in rural areas.

Racial composition as of the 2020 census
Race	Number	Percent
White	26,108	58.9%
Black or African American	6,846	15.4%
American Indian and Alaska Native	281	0.6%
Asian	811	1.8%
Native Hawaiian and Other Pacific Islander	17	0.0%
Some other race	5,745	13.0%
Two or more races	4,520	10.2%
Hispanic or Latino (of any race)	11,060	25.0%

=== 2010 census ===
As of the 2010 census, the city was 79.2% White, 10.9% Black or African American, 0.3% Native American, 1.4% Asian, and 2.9% were two or more races. Of the population, 11.3% were of Hispanic or Latino ancestry.

=== 2000 census ===
As of the 2000 census, there were 43,123 people, 17,961 households, and 9,878 families residing in the city. The population density was 6,296.3 inhabitants per square mile (2,431.0/km^{2}). There were 20,294 housing units at an average density of 2,963.1 per square mile (1,144.1/km^{2}). The racial makeup of the city was 92.30% White, 5.09% African American, 0.11% Native American, 0.79% Asian, 0.03% Pacific Islander, 0.53% from other races, and 1.15% from two or more races. Hispanic or Latino residents of any race were 1.58% of the population.

The average household size was 2.42. With population spread of 22.9% under the age of 18, 61.3% between the ages of 19–64, and 15.8% over the age of 65. Females made up 50.6% of the population.

The median household income was $37,902, while 26.6% of the city were found below the poverty line. The per capita income was $20,197.

=== Dialect ===
The local accent of American English is Northeast Pennsylvania English.

=== Religion ===
More than half (59.3%) of the city's population is religious: 43.8% Catholic, 4.4% Methodist, 3.1% Lutheran, 2.0% Presbyterian, 1.1% Pentecostal, 0.8% Judaism, 0.6% Episcopalian, 0.5% Baptist, 0.5% Islam, and 0.3% The Church of Jesus Christ of Latter-day Saints.

== Economy ==
As of March 2019, income per capita in Wilkes-Barre was $18,375, compared to the national average of $31,177. Household income was $32,484, compared to the national average of $57,652. Family median income was $42,782, compared to the national average of $70,850. The city's unemployment rate in March 2019 was 6.4%. Recent job growth was 0.8%. 49% of jobs were in sales, office, administrative support, production, transportation, and material moving sectors. In 2016, 30.1% of residents lived below the poverty line, more than double the Pennsylvania average of 12.9%. Large employers in the city include GUARD Insurance Group and Lord & Taylor.

== Arts and culture ==
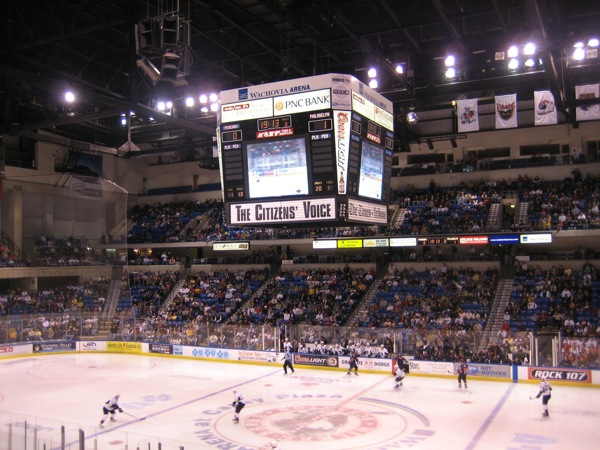
The Wilkes-Barre/Scranton Penguins, an American Hockey League development team affiliated with the Pittsburgh Penguins, play at Mohegan Sun Arena in neighboring Wilkes-Barre Township.

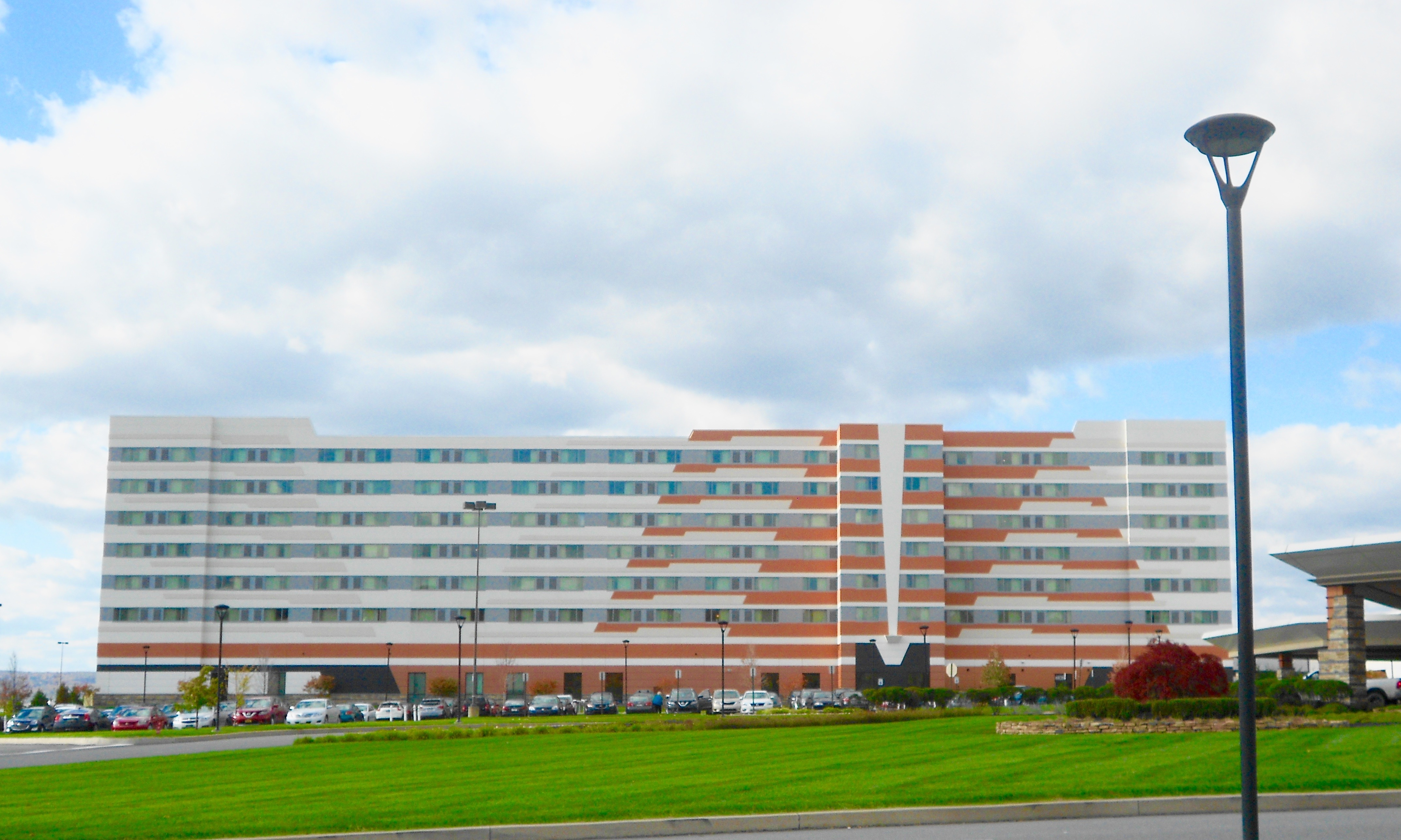
Mohegan Pennsylvania casino and hotel

=== Local attractions ===
- Dorothy Dickson Darte Center for the Performing Arts, located on the campus of Wilkes University
- F. M. Kirby Center for the Performing Arts
- Frederick Stegmaier Mansion
- Little Theatre of Wilkes-Barre
- Luzerne County Convention and Visitors Bureau
- Luzerne County Museum
- Mohegan Sun Arena at Casey Plaza
- Mohegan Pennsylvania, Pennsylvania's first slots casino
- River Street Historic District
- Stegmaier Brewery
- Wilkes-Barre station
- Wyoming Monument

=== Libraries ===
Along with the libraries associated with the colleges, Wilkes-Barre has several libraries. These include three branches of the Osterhout Free Library, with the headquarters for the Luzerne County Library System in the main branch.

== Sports ==
Club	League	Venue	Established	Parent Club	League Championships
Scranton/Wilkes-Barre Highlanders	IL, Baseball	PNC Field	1989	New York Yankees	2
Wilkes-Barre/Scranton Penguins	AHL, Ice hockey	Mohegan Sun Arena at Casey Plaza	1999	Pittsburgh Penguins	0
Wilkes-Barre/Scranton Mavericks	AF1, Arena football	Mohegan Sun Arena at Casey Plaza	2024	N/A	0

== Parks and recreation ==
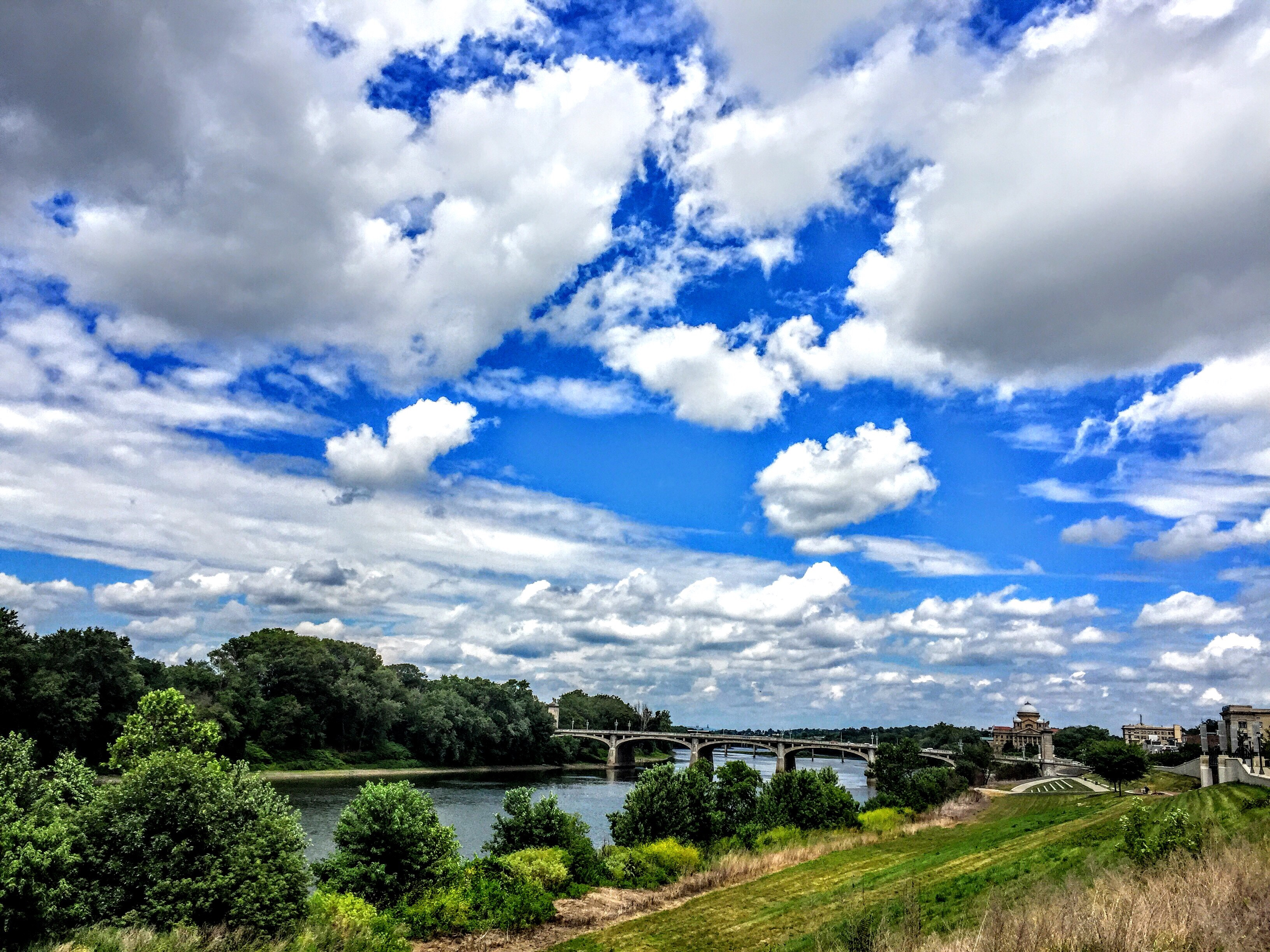
The River Common along the Susquehanna River

Wilkes-Barre has a Downtown Riverfront Park system that contains 91 acres of open space.

Kirby Park is a public park located along the western bank of the Susquehanna River. Kirby Park is one of the region's most valued recreational resources. Given to the city of Wilkes-Barre by the Kirby Family, the park welcomes hundreds of thousands each year. The park is the setting for the city's annual Cherry Blossom Festival (held during the last weekend of April) and the city's July 4 Celebration. Its amenities include tennis courts, a fitness trail, pond, walking paths, running track, softball fields, parking area, volleyball courts, pavilions, and more.

Nesbitt Park is also located on the west side of the Susquehanna River. It is located across from Kirby Park. Nesbitt is open to the public. It has walking paths and areas for picnicking.

The River Common is located along the eastern bank of the Susquehanna River. The Market Street Bridge bisects the park. The River Common joins with the Luzerne County Courthouse grounds. Its features include a 750-person amphitheater, paved walk-ways, gardens, ornamental trees, seating areas, a fishing pier, and two grand gateways connecting the city to the river.

Wilkes-Barre is also home to two municipal golf courses: Hollenback Golf Course, a nine-hole course located within the city, and Wilkes-Barre Golf Club, an 18-hole public course designed by Geoffrey Cornish in nearby Bear Creek Township.

== Government ==
=== City government ===
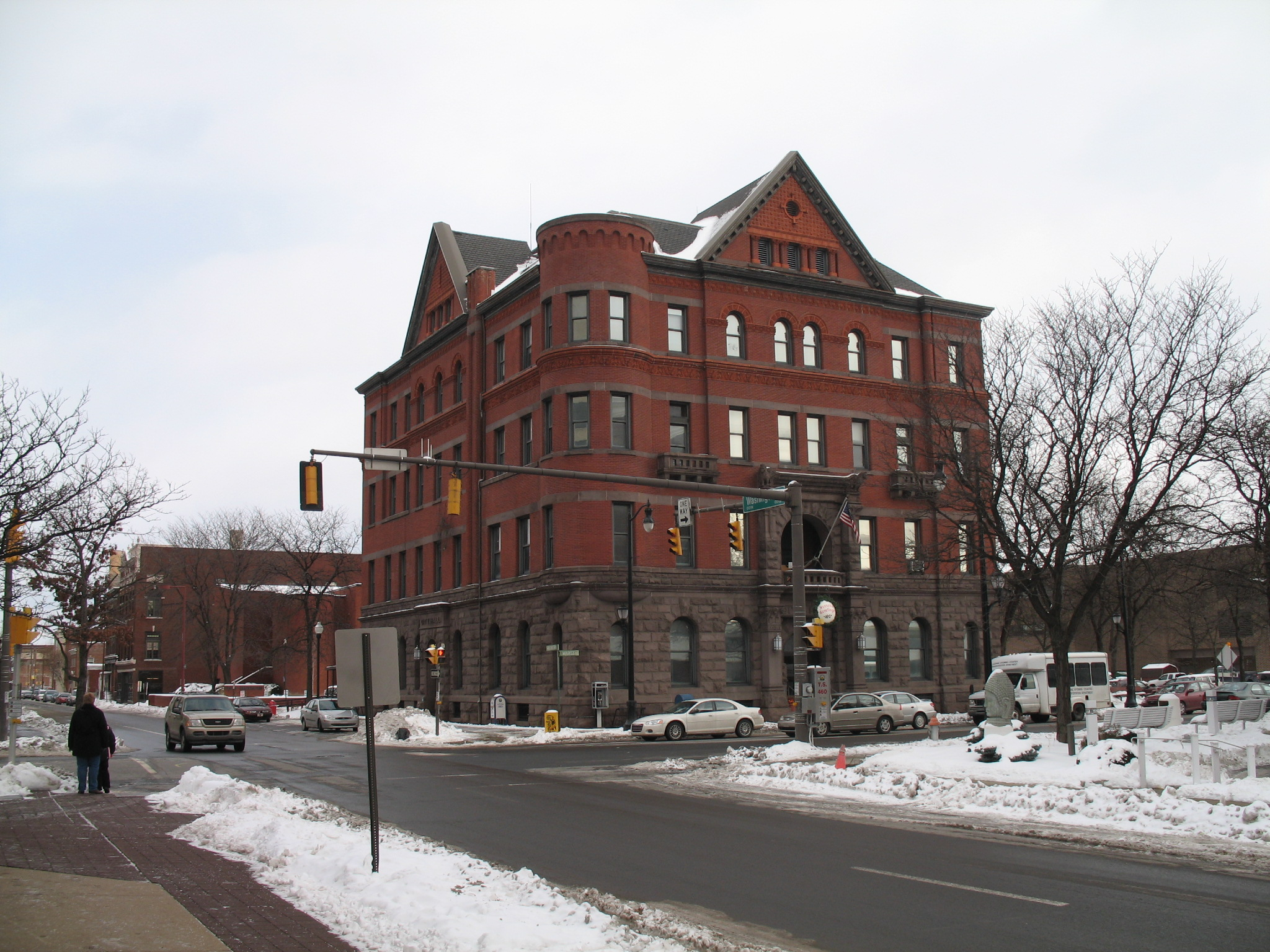
Wilkes-Barre City Hall

==== Executive ====
The city is headed by an elected mayor, who serves four-year terms. The current mayor is George Brown (Democrat). He has been in office since 2019.

==== Legislative ====
The legislative branch consists of a five-member City Council. They are elected by a single-member district to four-year terms.

=== County government ===
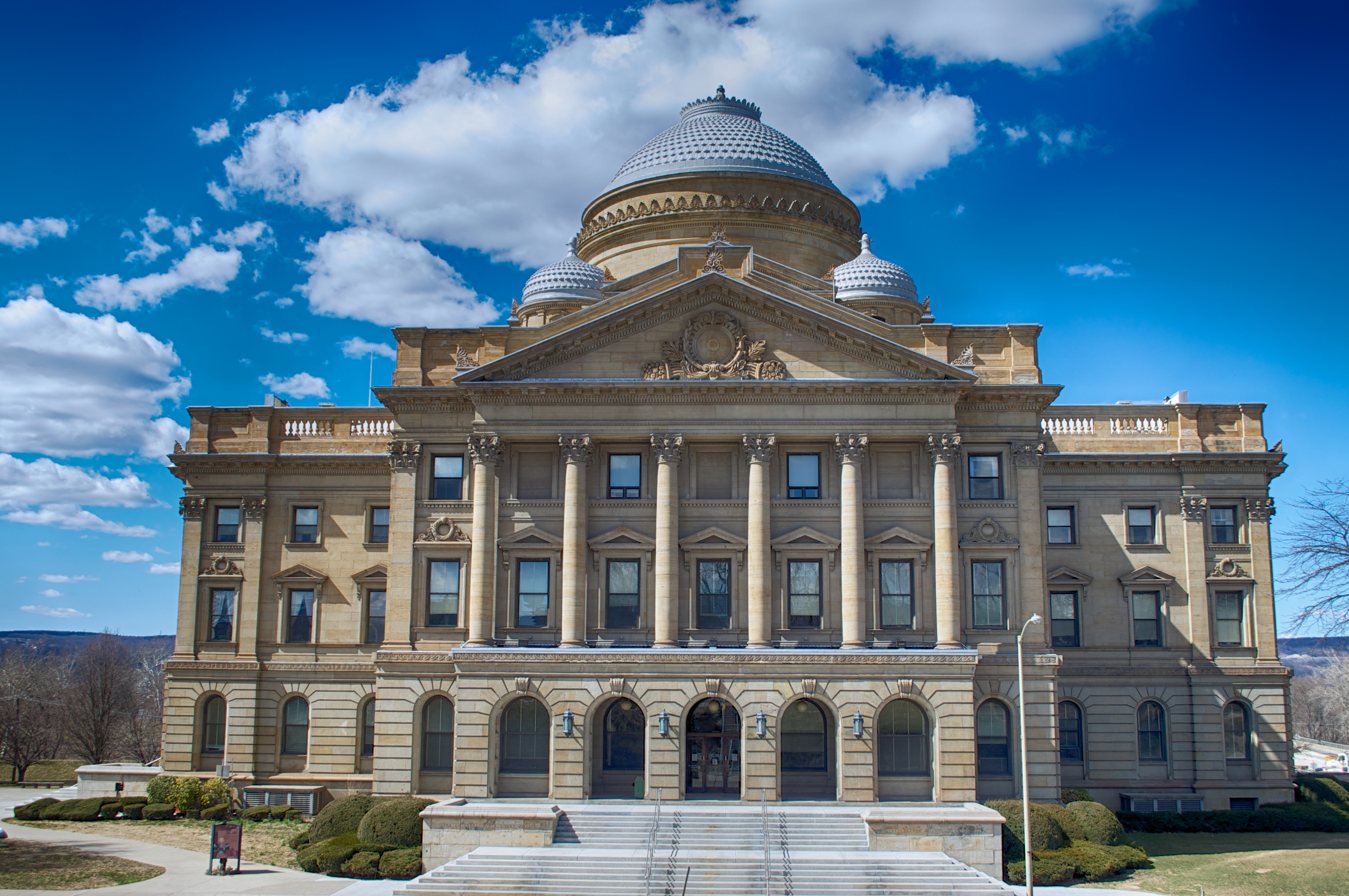
Luzerne County Courthouse houses the Luzerne County government.

A map of Luzerne County, with its county seat, Wilkes-Barre, highlighted in red.

The Luzerne County government operates out of Wilkes-Barre. The city is the administrative center of Luzerne County. The county government is responsible for imposing taxes, providing services to the public, and administering laws and regulations. They govern over a population of nearly 320,000 people. Many government offices are situated within the county courthouse (located at 200 North River Street in Downtown Wilkes-Barre). The Luzerne County Court of Common Pleas also operates out of the same building.

On November 2, 2010, the voters of Luzerne County held a referendum on the question of home rule. A total of 51,413 (55.25%) voted in favor of home rule, while another 41,639 (44.75%) voted against the move. This vote was the direct result of the corruption, wasteful spending, higher property taxes, and out-of-control debt facing the county. The home rule charter took effect on January 2, 2012; the Luzerne County Board of Commissioners was abolished and replaced with the new form of government (council–manager government). This government consists of a county council. The council chair, elected annually by their fellow councilmembers, serves as the presiding officer of the assembly and represents the legislative branch in official capacities and is the head of county government for ceremonial purposes. The council also appoints and works alongside a full-time manager (who supervises the county's day-to-day operations).

The county government is also made up of many other officials (e.g., the county controller, district attorney, and sheriff).

=== State and federal representation ===
==== State ====
- Eddie Day Pashinski (D) represents Wilkes-Barre in the Pennsylvania House of Representatives.
- Marty Flynn (D) represents the city in the Pennsylvania State Senate.

==== Federal ====
- Rob Bresnahan (R) represents Wilkes-Barre on the federal level (in the U.S. House of Representatives).
- Dave McCormick (R) and John Fetterman (D) represent the entire Commonwealth of Pennsylvania in the U.S. Senate.

== Education ==
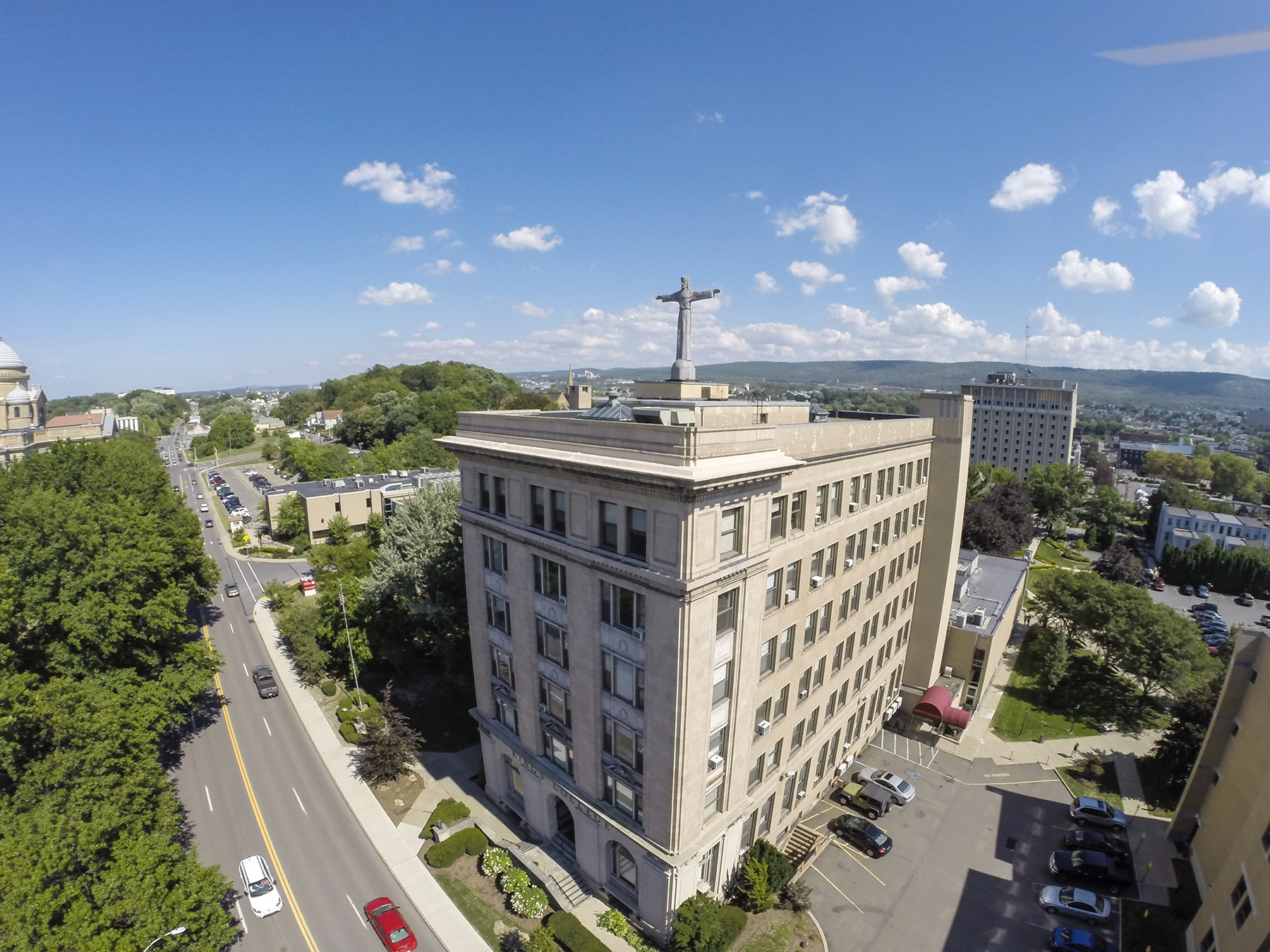
The Administration Building at King's College in February 2013

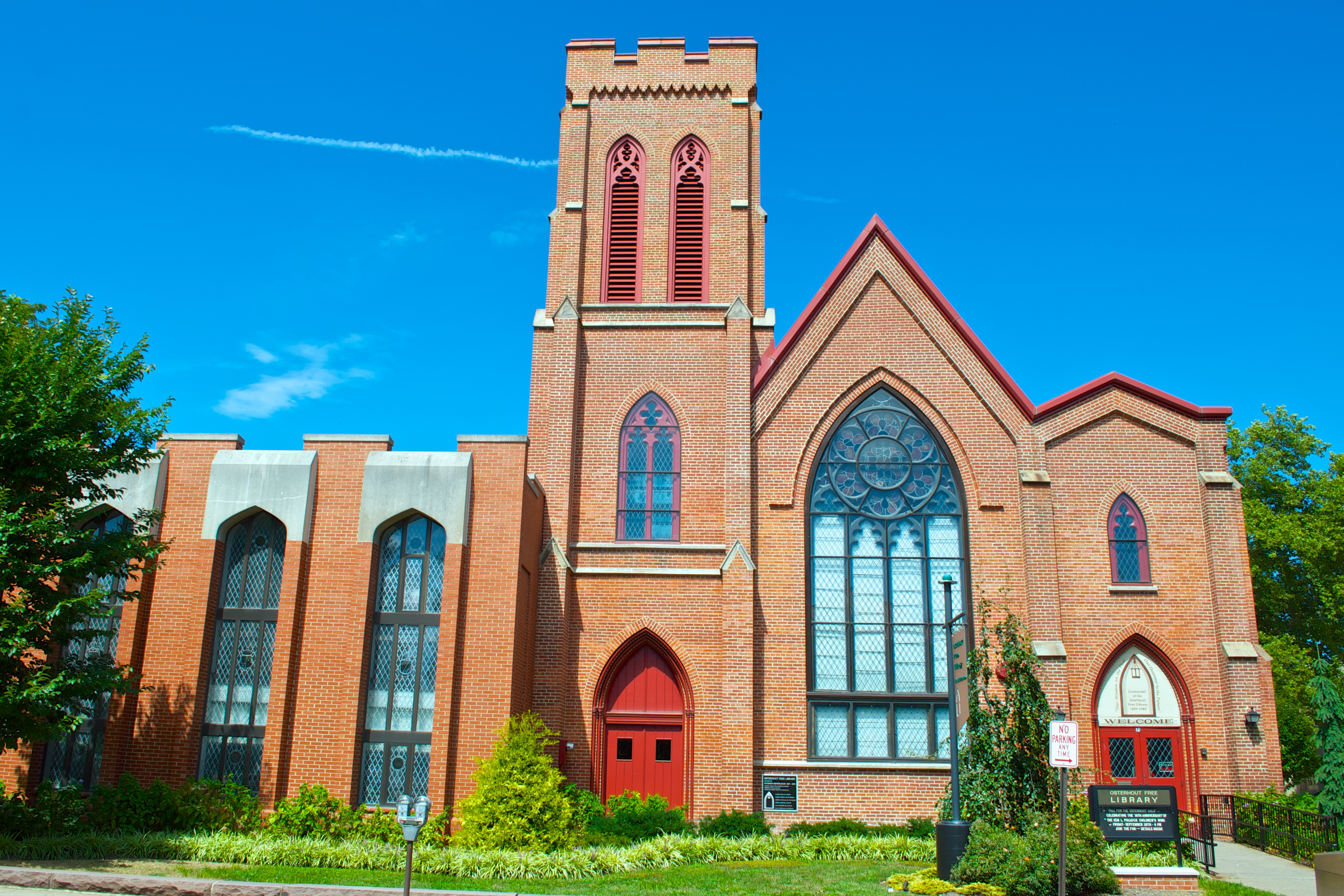
Osterhout Free Library in Wilkes-Barre in August 2012

=== High schools ===
Wilkes-Barre City is part of the Wilkes-Barre Area School District. The district operates one high school, Wilkes-Barre Area High School. It opened in 2020 and replaced James M. Coughlin High School, G. A. R. Memorial Junior Senior High School, and Elmer L. Meyers High School.

Holy Redeemer High School is a Catholic school in Wilkes-Barre managed by the Diocese of Scranton.

=== Colleges ===
- Geisinger Commonwealth School of Medicine, Wilkes Barre Campus
- King's College
- Luzerne County Community College
- Wilkes University

== Media ==
Times Leader and The Citizens' Voice are the two largest daily newspapers in Wilkes-Barre. The Wyoming Valley's NBC affiliate, WBRE-TV 28, is the only television station licensed to Wilkes-Barre, but WNEP-TV 16 (ABC), WYOU 22 (CBS), WVIA-TV 44 (PBS), and WSWB 38 (CW), all in Scranton, WOLF-TV 56 (Fox) in Hazleton, and WQMY 53 (MyNetworkTV) in Williamsport also serve the city. Wilkes-Barre's radio market is ranked No. 69 by Arbitron's ranking system. There are news, adult alternative, and music radio stations which are receivable in the area.

== Infrastructure ==
=== Transportation ===
==== Airports ====
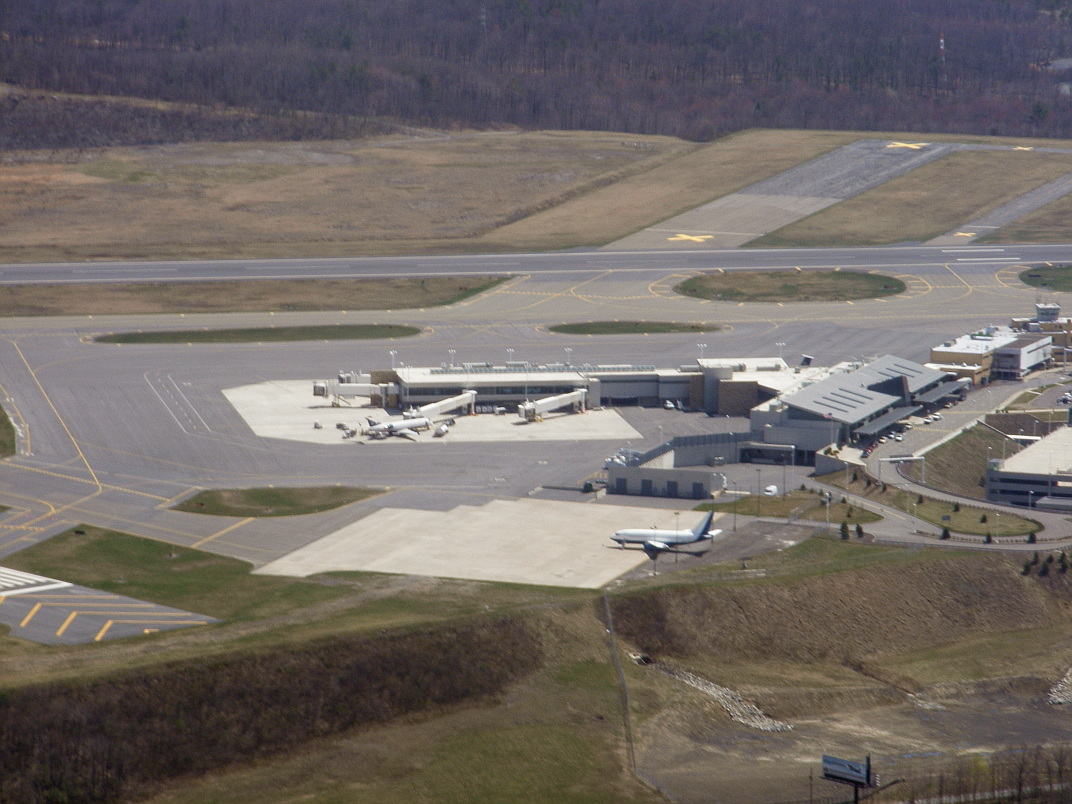
Wilkes-Barre/Scranton International Airport in April 2009

Two international airlines fly from the Wilkes-Barre/Scranton International Airport in nearby Pittston Township. Smaller, private planes may also use the Wilkes-Barre Wyoming Valley Airport in Forty Fort.

==== Highways ====
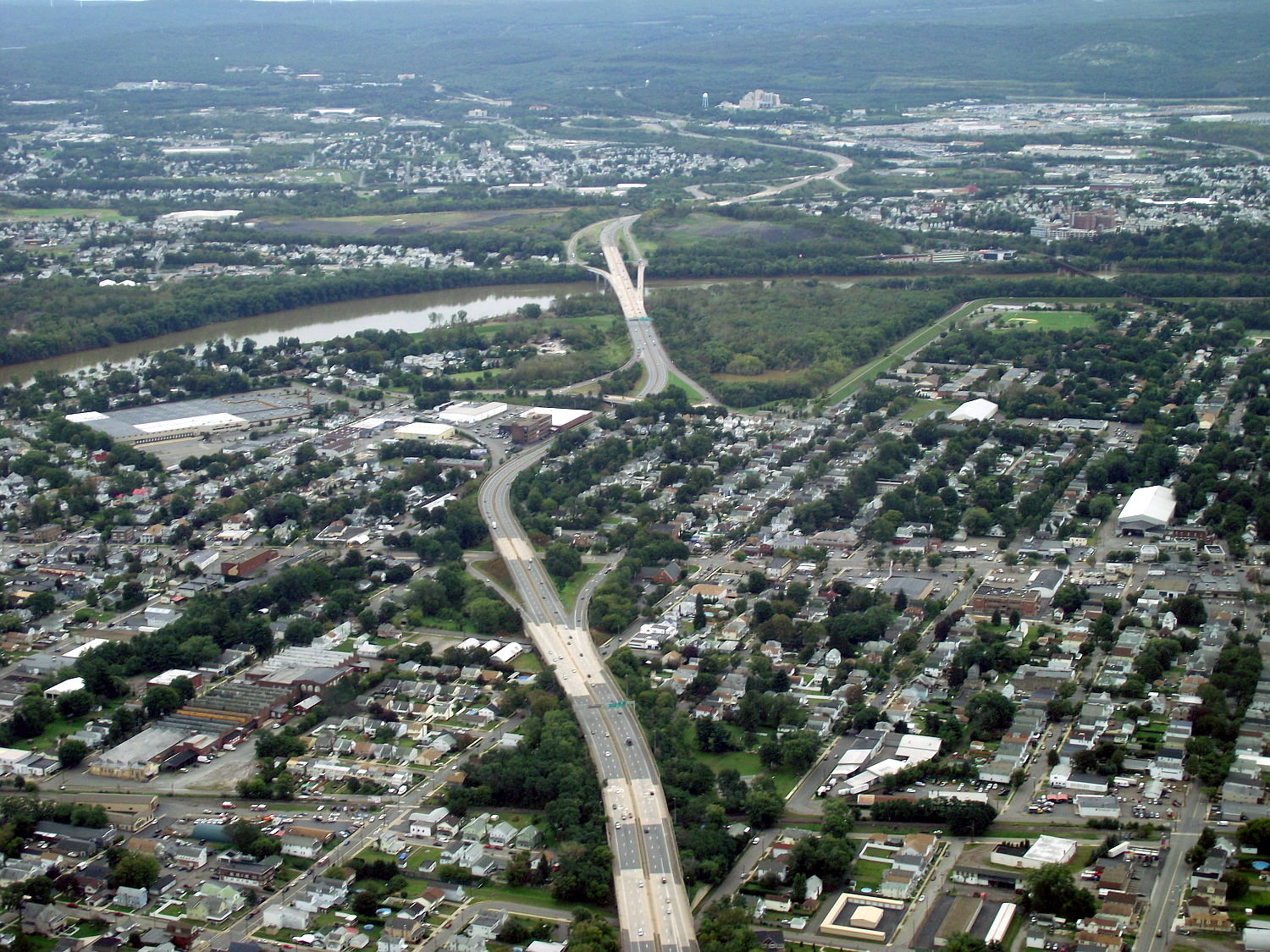
PA 309 running through northern Wilkes-Barre (visible in the upper right)

Interstate 81 passes north–south near Wilkes-Barre, and the city is also located near the Northeast Extension of the Pennsylvania Turnpike (Interstate 476). It is also about 10 miles (16 km) north of Interstate 80. The North Cross Valley Expressway, starting at the junction of Interstate 81 and Pennsylvania Route 115, carries Pennsylvania Route 309 through northern Wilkes-Barre, connecting the city to Dallas in the north. Route 115 provides access from the Pennsylvania Turnpike's Northeast Extension, but it does not enter Wilkes-Barre city limits.

==== Buses ====
Public transportation is provided by the Luzerne County Transportation Authority. In addition to servicing the city, it provides transportation for the northern half of the county. It also has a connecting bus to Scranton via an interchange at Pittston with the Transit System of Lackawanna County (COLTS), the public transit authority of Lackawanna County.

Martz Trailways provides intercity bus service from the Martz Trailways Bus Terminal in downtown Wilkes-Barre to Scranton, New York City, Philadelphia, Atlantic City, and Wind Creek Bethlehem.

Several jitney companies operate from Wilkes-Barre through Stroudsburg to Paterson and New York City via I-80, selling tickets through Uptown Vans

==== Rail ====
The city was at one time served by the Lehigh Valley Railroad, Central Railroad of New Jersey, the Delaware, Lackawanna and Western Railroad (later Erie Lackawanna Railway), Delaware and Hudson Railway, the Pennsylvania Railroad, the Wilkes-Barre and Eastern Railroad, and the Lackawanna and Wyoming Valley Railroad (known as the Laurel Line). CNJ trains included the Interstate Express (ending in 1957) and local service to Allentown and Philadelphia. The last Lehigh Valley trains were the Black Diamond (ending in 1959), John Wilkes and Maple Leaf (the last two, ending in 1961).

The Wilkes-Barre Traction Company formed a streetcar line from Georgetown to Nanticoke and over the river into Plymouth (it ceased operations in the mid-1940s).

The Norfolk Southern Railway, which acquired the former Delaware and Hudson line from successor Canadian Pacific Railway, and the Luzerne and Susquehanna Railway, provide freight service within the city.

== Notable people ==
- Jane Alexander, lawyer and Pennsylvania state representative
- George Emil Banks, spree killer
- Hazel Barnes, philosopher
- Douglas Carter Beane, playwright
- Al Bedner, NFL player
- Ray Black, Pitcher for the Milwaukee Brewers
- David Bohm, quantum physicist
- Fletcher C. Booker Jr., US Army major general
- Benjamin Burnley, lead singer and guitarist for rock band Breaking Benjamin
- Lillian Cahn, co-founder of Coach, Inc. and Coach handbag designer
- George Catlin, artist
- Britton Chance, bio-physicist and Olympic sailor
- Catherine Chandler, poet
- Mark Ciavarella, disgraced judge in kids for cash scandal
- Mark Cohen, street photographer
- Ed Cole, Major League Baseball pitcher
- Colleen Corby, 1960s fashion model
- Michael Costello, racing driver
- Mary Helen Peck Crane (1827–1891), activist, writer; mother of Stephen Crane
- Amasa Dana, former U.S. Congressman
- Frances Dorrance, founder of the Society for Pennsylvania Archaeology
- Charles B. Dougherty, Army National Guard major general who commanded the 28th Infantry Division
- Mark Duda, NFL player, Lackawanna College football head coach
- Francis A. "Mother" Dunn, football player for the Canton Bulldogs
- Benjamin F. Evans Jr. (1912–1991), U.S. Army major general, U.S. military's chief of joint U.S. military aid mission in Turkey
- Pete Elko, Major League Baseball third baseman
- Dave Evans, Hollywood filmmaker most known for the motion picture The Sandlot
- Jesse Fell, early experimenter with anthracite coal
- Pat Finn, game show host whose shows include Lifetime's, The Family Channel's, and PAX's Shop 'til You Drop
- Ham Fisher, cartoonist
- Red Davis, Third baseman for The New York Giants (baseball) 1941
- Tess Gardella, actress
- Billy Goeckel, baseball player
- Bob Good, U.S. congressman
- Kevin Gryboski, Retired Major League Baseball pitcher
- William Harmatz, jockey, winner of 1959 Preakness Stakes
- Laning Harvey, Pennsylvania state senator
- Mickey Haslin, Major League Baseball infielder
- George Washington Helme, businessman and founder of Helmetta, New Jersey
- Joe Hergert, former professional football player
- William Henry Hines, U.S. Representative for Pennsylvania's 12th congressional district from 1893 to 1895
- Raye Hollitt, bodybuilder and actress
- Qadry Ismail, former NFL wide receiver on the Baltimore Ravens
- Raghib Ismail, former NFL player and Heisman Trophy runner-up
- Florence Foster Jenkins, unconventional operatic soprano, subject of film starring Meryl Streep
- Candy Jones, fashion model, writer, radio personality
- Dorothy Andrews Elston Kabis, Treasurer of the United States
- James Karen, actor
- Mary Holland Kinkaid, journalist
- Michael J. Kirwan, represented Youngstown, Ohio in Congress, 1938–1970
- Al Klawitter, Major League Baseball pitcher
- Franz Kline, abstract expressionist painter
- Mike Konnick, former MLB player
- Mary Jo Kopechne, passenger killed in car driven by Ted Kennedy at Chappaquiddick
- Harley Jane Kozak, actress and author
- Matthew Lesko, infomercial personality
- Edward B. Lewis, winner of the 1995 Nobel Prize in physiology and medicine
- Santo Loquasto, production designer
- Garrick Mallery, ethnologist
- Herman Mankiewicz, screenwriter of Citizen Kane
- Joseph L. Mankiewicz, Academy Award-winning director and producer
- Al Markim, actor (Tom Corbett, Space Cadet)
- Mary McDonnell, actress twice nominated for Academy Award
- Edward Peter McManaman, Roman Catholic bishop
- Edward Meneeley, painter
- Asher Miner, U.S. Army brigadier general and prominent businessman
- Albert Mudrian, author and magazine editor
- Leo C. Mundy, Pennsylvania state senator and physician
- Jozef Murgas, radio pioneer
- Joe Murray, left-handed pitcher for the Philadelphia A's
- Claudette Nevins, actress
- Edward Novitski, geneticist
- Amedeo Obici, founder of Planters Peanuts
- Kid O'Hara, baseball player
- Rose O'Neill, cartoonist, illustrator, artist, and writer.
- Jerry Orbach, Tony Award-winning actor
- Phil Ostrowski, NFL player
- John Paluck, football player for Washington Redskins and Pro Bowl selection
- Joseph F. Perugino, US Army major general
- William Daniel Phillips, co-recipient of the 1997 Nobel Prize in Physics
- Mendy Rudolph, NBA referee from 1953 to 1975
- Sam Savitt, equestrian artist, author
- Michael Schoeffling, actor, played Jake Ryan in film Sixteen Candles
- Don Schwall, MLB pitcher
- M. Gerald Schwartzbach, California criminal defense attorney
- Greg Skrepenak, former NFL player, convicted felon
- Jonathan Slavin, character actor
- Ron Solt, former NFL player
- Jason Spisak, voice actor
- Harold Raynsford Stark, Chief of Naval Operations 1939–1942
- Cathey Steinberg, member of the Georgia General Assembly
- Jacob Sullum, journalist and author, featured in Academy Award-nominated documentary Super Size Me
- Bob Sura, basketball player, Houston Rockets
- Louis Teicher, pianist; member of the duo Ferrante & Teicher
- Alexis Toth (St. Alexis of Wilkes-Barre), saint in the Eastern Orthodox Church
- Ty Tyson, MLB outfielder
- John Walsh, MLB third baseman
- Helen L. Webster (1853–1928), philologist and educator
- Michael Whalen, actor
- Ira W. Wood, represented New Jersey's 4th congressional district from 1904 to 1913
- Hal Woodeshick, professional baseball player
- Tom Woodeshick, professional football player
- Frank Zane, bodybuilder, three-time Mr. Olympia, won Mr. America, Mr. Universe, Mr. World; donated gym at Wilkes University

== See also ==
- Giants Despair Hillclimb
- USS Wilkes-Barre
