= Ruth Wheeler =

American physical chemist

- Born: August 5, 1877; Plains, Luzerne County Pennsylvania
- Died: Poughkeepsie, New York, U.S.
- Scientific career
- Fields: Nutrition
- Institutions: University of Illinois; University of Iowa; Vassar College

Ruth Wheeler (1877–c. 1948 ) was an American chemist specialising in the field of nutrition and public education.

== Early life and education ==
Ruth Wheeler was born on 5 August 1877 in Plains, Pennsylvania, to Jared Ward Wheeler and Martha Jane Wheeler (née Evans). She was taught to read by her mother, and graduated from West Pittston High School in West Pittston, Pennsylvania. Her thinking was influenced by her Welsh grandfather, Rev. Dr. Evan Benjamin Evans, a minister concerned with feeding the poor.

In 1899, Wheeler graduated from Vassar College in New York.

== Career ==
She then taught high school science and German in West Pittston, Pennsylvania and Saratoga Springs, New York, before moving on to become a chemistry instructor at the Pratt Institute in Brooklyn. She became interested in home economics, a developing professional field which offered scientific opportunities for women.

During her career Wheeler taught at a number of universities, including the University of Illinois and University of Iowa. Wheeler also held a teaching position at Vassar College, where she taught chemistry, physiology and nutrition, between 1926 and 1944.

She also headed the American Red Cross Nutrition Service between 1917 and 1932, and during this time wrote the American Red Cross Textbook on Food and Nutrition (1927).

== Death ==
Wheeler died on 29 September 1948 at Vassar Brothers Hospital, Poughkeepsie, Dutchess, New York.
