= Elmer L. Meyers Junior/Senior High School =

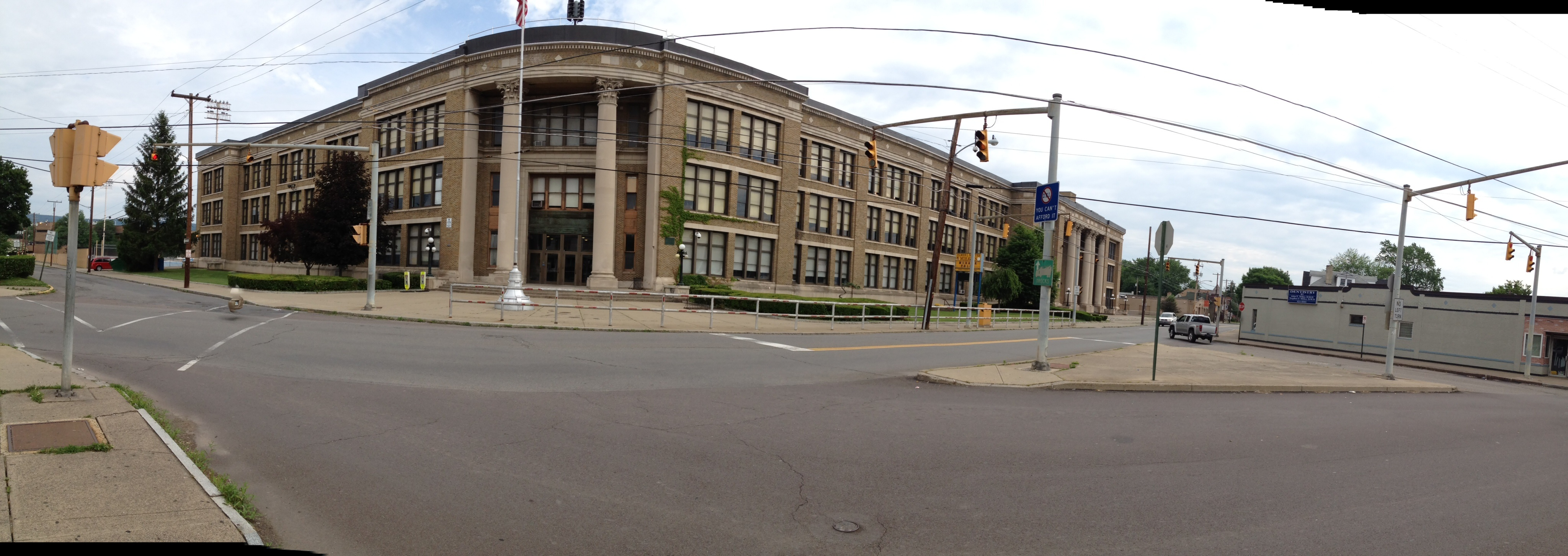

Location
- 341 Carey Avenue; Wilkes-Barre, Pennsylvania 18702; United States; 41°14′21″N 75°54′31″W

Information
- Type: Public Junior-Senior High School
- Motto: "Steadfast Forever, Meyers High"
- Established: 1930
- Closed: 2021
- School district: Wilkes-Barre Area School District
- Staff: 61.75 (FTE)
- Grades: 7–12
- Student to teacher ratio: 14.17
- Campus size: > 3 acres (1.2 ha)
- Colors: Royal blue & gold
- Nickname: Mohawks
- Rivals: GAR Memorial Junior Senior High School, James M. Coughlin High School, And Holy Cross High School
- Website: Official website

Elmer L. Meyers Junior/Senior High School (commonly known throughout the area as 'E. L. Meyers' or 'Meyers') was an urban, public school located on 341 Carey Avenue, in Wilkes-Barre, Pennsylvania. It was one of three public high schools in the Wilkes-Barre Area School District. Meyers was both a junior and senior public high school, offering education to approximately 898 students in grades 7–12. The student to teacher ratio was approximately 12.6 students per teacher. Meyers' sports teams were called "Mohawks".

== History ==
Located on 341 Carey Avenue, in Wilkes-Barre, Pennsylvania, Elmer L. Meyers Junior/Senior High School opened in 1930 and closed in 2021. Both a junior and senior public high school, it offered education to students in grades 7–12. Meyers provided education to approximately 898 students in grades 7–12, with a teacher ratio of approximately 12.6 students per teacher.

=== Closure ===
By the early 21st century, the school was seen to be in disrepair from apparent neglect, with safety structures erected in front of building façade and repairs needed for the attached stadium. On June 10, 2016, the Wilkes-Barre Area School Board voted to consolidate the local schools, merging Meyers and Coughlin into a new 9th through 12th grade school to be built on the Coughlin site in downtown Wilkes-Barre. The 7th and 8th grades will be merged with Kistler Elementary to make that into a K-8th school. The Board was unable to move forward with the plan to use the Coughlin site or another site in Wilkes-Barre. In February 2018, the Board expressed a plan to use Meyers as a middle school. On March 5, 2018, the Board voted to purchase land in Plains, Pennsylvania for the merged high school.

The plans faced vocal opposition, with some proposing that the school be turned into a charter school. The school has been listed as an "At Risk" for historic preservation location by Preservation Pennsylvania, who noted that "[a]s a Depression-era construction project, the school embodies the grand design of early 20th-century public architecture. It serves a diverse neighborhood, and is located in a central location that children can walk to." The school was sold prior to the opening of Wilkes-Barre Area High School, with the intention to become a assisted living center.

=== Visits ===
Meyer has had visits from various famous individuals. John Philip Sousa performed in the auditorium August 31, 1931. Amelia Earhart visited in spring of 1936 after the Meyers High School Women's Club brought her in to talk to students about "Adventures in Flying".

More recently, the school had Travis Clark and Hunter Thomsen from We The Kings perform an acoustic set in October 2009. After winning a contest from local radio station 97 BHT, the two members performed a free show in the auditorium.

== Building ==
The school's main stairway is made of Giallo d’Istria marble with brass railings and the main auditorium features a stained glass work, including a ceiling with the state seal of the 48 states in the United States at the time of the school's construction. The exterior of Meyers is made of brick walls with terra cotta lintels and stone cornices, and a number of parapets—some of which were removed for safety in 2007. The school has space designated as fallout shelter. It was flooded in 1972 from Hurricane Agnes and survived.

Attached to the school was Wilkes-Barre Memorial Stadium, which contained a track and American football field used for all of Wilkes-Barre Area School District's public high schools and Holy Redeemer High School.

== Traditions ==
The student body of Meyers were collectively referred to as "Mohawks". Meyers had many traditions including Moving Up Day, a ceremony that officially marked the junior class move to senior status, as well as the senior class moving to the stage for graduation, which happened the day after in the school's auditorium. The school also celebrated senior tea, a tradition that was started in the 1930s.

== Extracurricular activities ==
The school offered many sports and activities for students to participate in. Traditionally having a similarly sized student body that pitted them against each other in numerous activities, Meyers and G.A.R. High Schools enjoyed one of the longest standing sports rivalries in the Wyoming Valley.

=== Sports ===
Meyers offered sports in the Fall, Winter, and Spring. Those sports included; cross country, field hockey, football, golf, boys' and girls' soccer, girls' volleyball, boys' and girls' basketball, swimming & diving, wrestling, baseball, softball, and track & field.

=== Clubs ===
Meyers offered year-round clubs for students. The clubs ranged from Meyers-specific clubs, such as the Elmprint Club (newspaper) and Colophon Club (yearbook), to national clubs and organizations, such as F.B.L.A. and National Honors Society.

Other clubs offered include the Art Club, Chess Club, Computer Club, Diversity Club, Drama Club, Envirothon, F.B.L.A., Key Club, Math Club, National Honors Society, Scholastic Scrimmage, Ski Club, Spanish Club, Speech and Debate, Stage Crew, Student Council, and Watershed Project.

In terms of musical groups, the school offered chorus, jazz band, marching band, and orchestra.

=== STEM ===
The school obtained grants to start a STEM lab in 2014, which includes a 3D printer and zScape machine. Additionally, it hosts Adam Iseman's BEST Awards, a popular STEM competition which has produced a working phone, arachnoid robot, and 3D printed Lazarus hand.

=== Speech and debate ===
E. L. Meyers High School was known across the country for its speech and debate team. Founded in 1997, Meyers hosted the Martin Luther King Open Speech and Debate Tournament every January. The team was tied for a national championship with four other schools in 2009 at the National Catholic Forensic League championships held in Albany, New York.

The team offered students a host of events to choose to compete in. Some of the events that the team hosts include Lincoln–Douglas debate, policy debate, public forum debate, extemporaneous speaking, declamation, oral interpretation, original oratory, duo interpretation of literature, and dramatic interpretation.

== Notable alumni ==
- Gary Dale – United States Air Force
- Dan Chariton – screenwriter
- Qadry Ismail – NFL Analyst, former NFL wide receiver
- Raghib Ismail – former NFL wide receiver
- Edward B. Lewis – geneticist, Nobel Prize Winner (1995)
- Phil Ostrowski – former NFL player
- Joseph F. Perugino – US Army major general
- Stephen A. Urban – politician
- Irwin Weinberg – philatelist and stamp dealer

== See also ==
- Wilkes-Barre Area Wolfpack
