= Hudson, Pennsylvania =

Unincorporated community in Pennsylvania, US

- Census-designated place
- Location in Pennsylvania Location in the United States
- Coordinates: 41°16′38″N 75°49′52″W
- Country: United States
- State: Pennsylvania
- County: Luzerne
- Township: Plains

Area
  - Total: 0.38 sq mi (0.98 km^{2})
  - Land: 0.38 sq mi (0.98 km^{2})
  - Water: 0 sq mi (0.00 km^{2})

Population (2020)
  - Total: 1,436
  - Density: 3,803.5/sq mi (1,468.55/km^{2})
- Time zone: UTC-5 (Eastern (EST))
  - Summer (DST): UTC-4 (EDT)
- ZIP code: 18705
- Area code: 570
- FIPS code: 42-36096

Hudson is a census-designated place (CDP) in Plains Township, Pennsylvania, United States. The population was 1,443 at the 2010 census.

== Geography ==
Hudson is located at 41°16′38″N 75°49′52″W.

According to the United States Census Bureau, the CDP has a total area of 0.39 square miles (1.0 km^{2}), all land. It is located near the center of Plains Township (east of the CDP of Plains).

== Demographics ==
Historical population
Census	Pop.	Note	%±
2020	1,436		—
U.S. Decennial Census

== Education ==
It is in the Wilkes-Barre Area School District.
