= James M. Coughlin High School =

Location
- 80 North Washington Street; Wilkes-Barre, Pennsylvania 18702; United States; 41°14′47″N 75°52′43″W

Information
- Established: 1890
- Founder: Clarence Coughlin
- Status: Closed
- Closed: June 10, 2021
- School district: Wilkes-Barre Area School District
- Staff: 57.27 (FTE)
- Student to teacher ratio: 15.56
- Mascot: Crusader
- Team name: Coughlin Crusaders
- Newspaper: The Journal (1893–2021)
- Yearbook: The Breidlin (1926–2021); The Yearbook (1924-1925)
- Website: www.wbasd.k12.pa.us/coughlinhighschool_home.aspx

James M. Coughlin High School was an urban school located in Wilkes-Barre, Pennsylvania. It served grades 9–12 in the Wilkes-Barre Area School District.

== History ==
Established in 1890 as Wilkes-Barre High School, the current school structure was scheduled to be built on the original school's site in 1905, but due to a flood—which flooded the entire basement and first floor—building had to be restarted. The building was opened unofficially on September 11, 1911, and formally dedicated in October 1912. The second part of the building, the Annex, was built in 1955 and formally dedicated on November 2, 1955. The main building has four floors, a basement, and an attic, and the Annex has three with a partial basement. It is the oldest public school in Pennsylvania being built in 1909, the older of the two buildings that makes up Coughlin is over 100 years old. The second building is about 60 years old.

With the construction of a second high school in Wilkes-Barre in 1925, the building was dedicated as James M. Coughlin High School in memory of Superintendent James Martin Coughlin, who served in that capacity from 1890 to 1918.

The main building was closed on December 23, 2015, after 104 years of continuous use. This came as a result of a lengthy series of meetings by the Wilkes-Barre Area School Board, where it was decided that Coughlin and another Wilkes-Barre Area High School (Elmer L. Meyers Junior/Senior High School) would close and combine after the Coughlin site is closed, and rebuilt. The Annex building would continue to house 11th and 12th grade students until the new school is built, and 9th and 10th grade students placed in a recently renovated former Mackin Elementary School building, and the 11th and 12th graders will be placed in the old Times Leader building next to Coughlin.

It was then later decided to include G.A.R Junior/Senior High School in the closure and consolidation plan. Therefore, all three Wilkes-Barre Area High School buildings would close and merge to the new Wilkes-Barre Area High School. The G.A.R. building would be converted to a middle school for grades 6-8.

Construction was expected to be completed by early 2018, when all three former high schools would converge in the new school. However, the Board was unable to move forward with the plan to use the Coughlin site. On March 5, 2018, the Board voted to purchase land in Plains, Pennsylvania for the merged high school. The plans faced vocal opposition, but Wilkes-Barre Area High School opened as a new consolidated high school for the 2021–2022 school year. The Coughlin property was sold for $1.65 million in January 2021.

== Notable alumni ==
- Jeff Cardoni, composer of American Pie Presents: The Naked Mile, Open Season 3, and CSI: Miami (since 2002)
- Nick Cotillo, bassist for Traverse the Abyss
- Catherine Chandler, poet
- M.R. Erfman, dark fantasy author
- N. Robert Fazio, fiction author
- Pat Finn, host of The Joker's Wild from 1990 to 1991 and Shop 'til You Drop (1991–94; 1996–98; 2000–2)
- Ham Fisher (1918), cartoonist of Joe Palooka comic strip.
- Dorothy Andrews Elston Kabis, 33rd Treasurer of the United States
- James Karen, actor.
- Bruce Kozerski, former American football center in the National Football League for the Cincinnati Bengals
- Thomas William McNamara, United States Navy Rear Admiral
- James L. Nelligan, former Congressman from Pennsylvania's 11th Congressional District (1981–1983)
- Zelda Feinberg Popkin, novelist
- Ron Solt, former American football guard in the National Football League for the Indianapolis Colts and the Philadelphia Eagles
- Harold Rainsford Stark (1940), U.S. Navy Admiral; Chief of Naval Operations (1939–42).
- Edward White, former State Representative and owner/manager of the Wilkes-Barre Barons
