= Wilkes-Barre Area High School =

Location
- 2021 Wolfpack Way; Plains, Pennsylvania 18705; United States
- 41°16′0″N 75°51′32″W

Information
- Type: Public high school
- Established: 2021
- School district: Wilkes-Barre Area School District
- Teaching staff: 114.59 (FTE)
- Grades: 9–12
- Student to teacher ratio: 21.56
- Athletics conference: PIAA District 2
- Nickname: Wolfpack
- Website: Official website

Wilkes-Barre Area High School is a high school in the Wilkes-Barre Area School District, located in Plains, Pennsylvania. The student body mascot is the Wolfpack. The school opened in August 2021, replacing James M. Coughlin High School, G. A. R. Memorial Junior/Senior High School, and Elmer L. Meyers Junior/Senior High School.

== History ==
Wilkes-Barre Area High School is the Wilkes-Barre Area School District high school in Plains, Pennsylvania. It is a replacement for James M. Coughlin High School, G. A. R. Memorial Junior/Senior High School, and Elmer L. Meyers Junior/Senior High School.

=== Consolidation of previous high schools ===
In the 2010s, the Wilkes-Barre school district entertained various plans to reduce its schools by consolidation. The current schools were deemed inadequate or unsafe, with high costs to repair. By 2018, the school board had solidified plans for construction of a new high school to serve the entire district, at a cost of $121 million. Construction of a stadium was later added to the plans.

==== Construction ====
Several locations were entertained for a site of the new high school, including existing school sites, the Murray Complex, and a former coal mining site known as the Pagnotti Site. After the zoning board denied the district's request to build a combined school at the site of Coughlin High School, the school board decided to purchase the Pagnotti Site in Plains, Pennsylvania. The school was ready for the 2021–2022 school year, and opened with four principals and two thousand students.

==== Consolidation criticism ====
Several groups opposed the merger for a number of reasons, and early criticism was directed at consolidation efforts in general. Opponents disagreed with estimates to repair the existing schools and the costs of a new school, and noted negative effects of moving to a single high school, including increased reliance on bussing and decreased community engagement. After the selection of the high school's location, criticism also included concerns about the health and safety of building a high school on coal ash over a former coal mine.

== Extracurriculars ==
Due to declining participation in sports, the district merged the sports programs for the 2019 school year, prior to the construction of the new high school. Based on input from students and employees, the district voted for Wolfpack to be mascot of the consolidated sports programs. The Wolfpack's first game as a team was football in August 2019.

The basketball team won their PIAA District 2 championship in 2020.

== See also ==
- Wilkes-Barre Area School District
