= Hilldale, Pennsylvania =

Unincorporated community in Pennsylvania, US

- Census-designated place
- Location in Pennsylvania Location in the United States
- Coordinates: 41°17′12″N 75°50′7″W
- Country: United States
- State: Pennsylvania
- County: Luzerne
- Township: Plains

Area
  - Total: 0.82 sq mi (2.12 km^{2})
  - Land: 0.82 sq mi (2.12 km^{2})
  - Water: 0 sq mi (0.00 km^{2})

Population (2020)
  - Total: 1,120
  - Density: 1,367.8/sq mi (528.11/km^{2})
- Time zone: UTC-5 (Eastern (EST))
  - Summer (DST): UTC-4 (EDT)
- Area code: 570
- FIPS code: 42-34776

Hilldale is a census-designated place (CDP) in Plains Township, Pennsylvania, United States. The population was 1,246 at the time of the 2010 census.

== Geography ==
Hilldale is located at 41°17′12″N 75°50′7″W.

According to the United States Census Bureau, the CDP has a total area of 0.85 square miles (2.2 km^{2}), all land. It is located along North Main Street in Plains Township; it is directly northeast of the CDP of Plains.

North Main Street continues northeastward into Jenkins Township, where it becomes South Main Street and passes through the CDP of Inkerman. The Susquehanna River is less than one-half mile northwest of Hilldale, separating the CDP from the boroughs of Wyoming and Forty Fort.

== Demographics ==
Historical population
Census	Pop.	Note	%±
2020	1,120		—
U.S. Decennial Census

== Education ==
It is in the Wilkes-Barre Area School District.
