= Mark Glowinski =

American football player (born 1992)

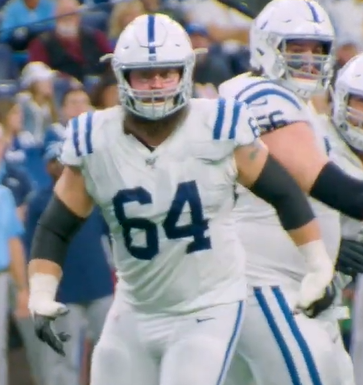
- Glowinski with the Indianapolis Colts in 2019

No. 63, 64
- Position: Guard

Personal information
- Born: May 3, 1992 (age 34); Wilkes-Barre, Pennsylvania, U.S.
- Listed height: 6 ft 4 in (1.93 m)
- Listed weight: 310 lb (141 kg)

Career information
- High school: G.A.R. Memorial (Wilkes-Barre)
- College: Lackawanna (2010–2011); West Virginia (2012–2014)
- NFL draft: 2015: 4th round, 134th overall pick

Career history
- Seattle Seahawks (2015–2017); Indianapolis Colts (2017–2021); New York Giants (2022–2023); Indianapolis Colts (2024)

Awards and highlights
- First-team All-Big 12 (2014)

Career NFL statistics
- Games played: 129
- Games started: 101
- Stats at Pro Football Reference

Mark Glowinski II (born May 3, 1992) is an American former professional football guard. He played college football for the Lackawanna Falcons and West Virginia Mountaineers. He was selected by the Seattle Seahawks in the fourth round of the 2015 NFL draft.

== Early life ==
Glowinski was born on May 3, 1992 in Wilkes-Barre, Pennsylvania as one of two children to Dawn (née Smurl) and Mark Glowinski Sr. Glowinski attended G.A.R. Memorial High school in Wilkes-Barre where he played as a 6 ft 4 in (1.93 m), 275 pounds (125 kg) offensive and defensive lineman with the Grenadiers football team as a three-year starter in both duties. He also served the Grenadiers as team captain. While at G.A.R. Memorial, Glowinski was named on the Garrett Ford Academic Honor Roll.

Glowinski also competed in track & field including shot put, discus and javelin contests.

== College career ==
Glowinski first played at Lackawanna College as a starting offensive lineman with the Lackawanna Falcons football team for his freshman and sophomore years beginning in 2010 and ending 2012. While at Lackwanna, Glowinski was named a 2011 NJCAA second team All-American. Rated a three-star recruiting prospect, Glowinski received offers from West Virginia, Connecticut and Kansas State.

After his junior redshirt season in 2012, Glowinski joined the field as a right guard with the West Virginia Mountaineers. Initially assigned as a tackle, Glowinski played as a starting right guard in all 12 games of the 2013 season. After sitting out the 2014 season as a redshirt senior, Glowinski entered the 2015 NFL draft. While at West Virginia, Glowinski majored in multidisciplinary studies.

== Professional career ==
Pre-draft measurables
Height	Weight	Arm length	Hand span	40-yard dash	10-yard split	20-yard split	20-yard shuttle	Three-cone drill	Vertical jump	Broad jump	Bench press
6 ft 4 3/8 in (1.94 m)	307 lb (139 kg)	33 1/8 in (0.84 m)	9 3/4 in (0.25 m)	5.13 s	1.71 s	2.90 s	4.58 s	7.56 s	31.0 in (0.79 m)	9 ft 5 in (2.87 m)	31 reps
All values from NFL Combine/Pro Day

=== Seattle Seahawks ===
Glowinski was drafted by the Seattle Seahawks in the fourth round, 134th overall, of the 2015 NFL draft.

In 2016, Glowinski earned the starting left guard spot, starting all 16 games for the Seahawks.

Glowinski entered the 2017 season as the Seahawks' starting right guard, starting the first two games before losing the starting job to Oday Aboushi. The other guard spot was taken by the veteran Luke Joeckel with the primary backup spot taken by rookie Ethan Pocic, moving Glowinski to fourth on the depth chart at guard. After an injury to Aboushi, followed by the emergence of the rookie Pocic as a starter opposite Joeckel, Glowinski was waived by the Seahawks on December 16, 2017.

=== Indianapolis Colts (first stint) ===
On December 18, 2017, Glowinski was claimed off waivers by the Indianapolis Colts.

After beginning the season as a backup, Glowinski was named the starting right guard in Week 6 following a season-ending injury to Matt Slauson. He then started nine of the final 11 games.

On January 29, 2019, Glowinski signed a three-year, $18 million contract extension with the Colts through the 2021 season.

=== New York Giants ===
On March 17, 2022, Glowinski signed a three-year deal worth $20 million contract with the New York Giants.

On September 17, 2023, Glowinski was benched after a poor performance against the Dallas Cowboys Week 1 of the 2023 season. Marcus McKethan was named the starting right guard for Week 2 against the Arizona Cardinals.

Glowinski was released by the Giants on March 4, 2024.

=== Indianapolis Colts (second stint) ===
On November 21, 2024, Glowinski was signed to the Indianapolis Colts practice squad. After starting the next three games, he was signed to the active roster on December 24.

== Personal life ==
On July 16, 2022, Glowinski coached his first High School Football Camp at the King's College Athletic Complex in Wilkes-Barre. Outside of football, Glowinski enjoys competitive bowling.
