= Rocket Ismail =

American football player (born 1969)

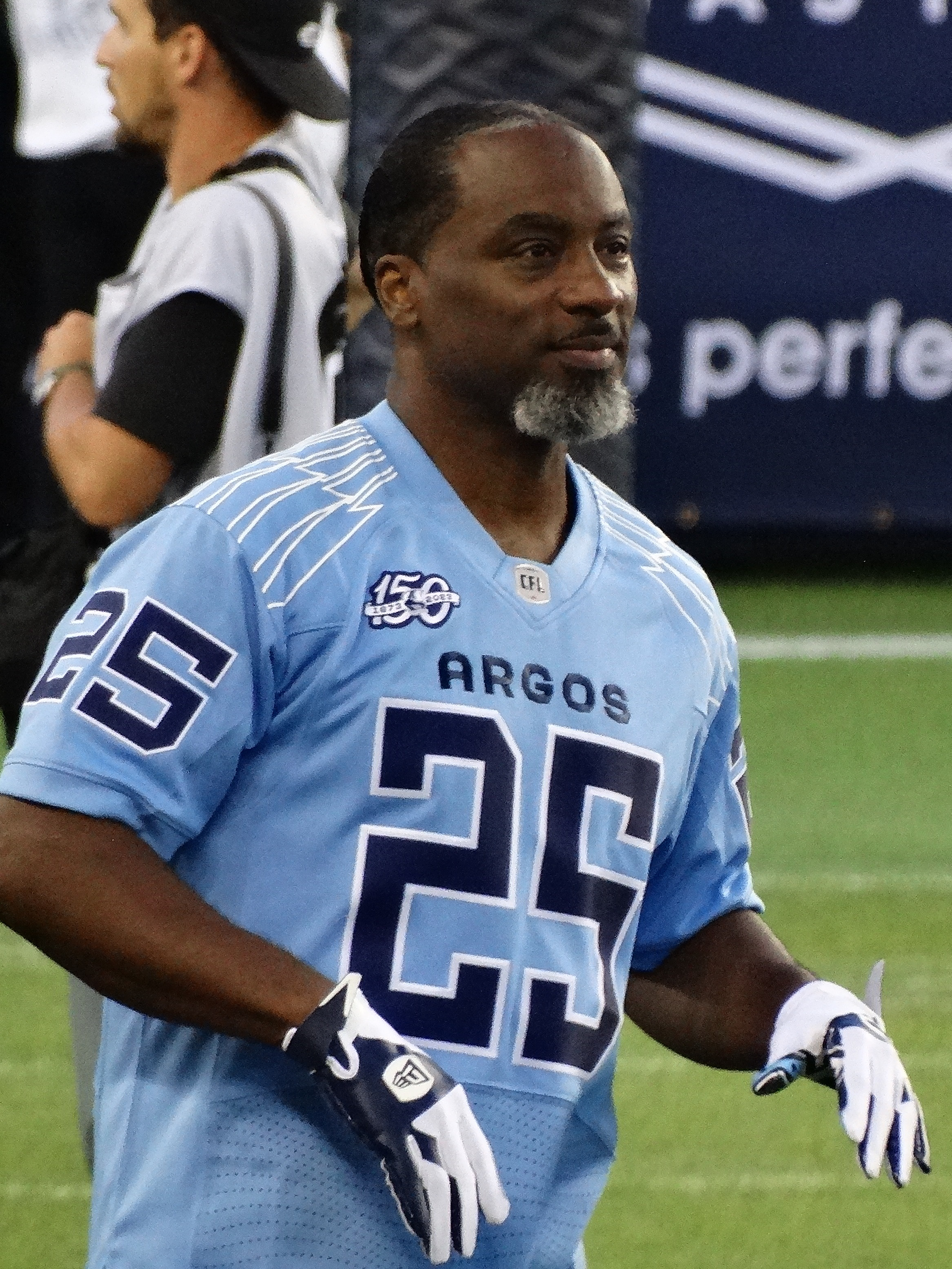
- Ismail in 2023

No. 25, 86, 81
- Position: Wide receiver

Personal information
- Born: November 19, 1969 (age 56); Elizabeth, New Jersey, U.S.
- Listed height: 5 ft 11 in (1.80 m)
- Listed weight: 185 lb (84 kg)

Career information
- High school: Meyers (Wilkes-Barre, Pennsylvania)
- College: Notre Dame (1988–1990)
- NFL draft: 1991: 4th round, 100th overall pick

Career history
- Toronto Argonauts (1991–1992); Los Angeles / Oakland Raiders (1993–1995); Carolina Panthers (1996–1998); Dallas Cowboys (1999–2001)

Awards and highlights
- Grey Cup champion (1991); Grey Cup MVP (1991); Frank M. Gibson Trophy (1991); CFL All-Star (1991); Walter Camp Award (1990); Sporting News Player of the Year (1990); Unanimous All-American (1990); First-team All-American (1989)

Career NFL statistics
- Receptions: 363
- Receiving yards: 5,295
- Receiving touchdowns: 28
- Stats at Pro Football Reference
- College Football Hall of Fame

Raghib Ramadian "Rocket" Ismail (born November 18, 1969) is an American former professional football player who was a wide receiver in the National Football League (NFL) and Canadian Football League (CFL). He played college football for the Notre Dame Fighting Irish before moving on to both the CFL from 1991 to 1992 and the NFL from 1993 to 2001.

Ismail was a consensus All-American with Notre Dame. He recorded two 1,000-yard receiving seasons in the NFL and was a CFL All-Star in 1991, as well as the Most Valuable Player of the 79th Grey Cup. In 2004, College Football News named Ismail the No. 75 player on its list of the Top 100 Greatest College Football Players of All-Time. He was also selected by Sports Illustrated to the 85-man roster of its all-20th Century college football team.

== Early life and family ==
Ismail was born in Elizabeth, New Jersey and was raised in Wilkes-Barre, Pennsylvania. He attended Elmer L. Meyers Junior/Senior High School. He is the older brother of Qadry Ismail, who had a standout career as a wide receiver for the Syracuse Orange, and played ten seasons in the NFL for various teams.

== College career ==
=== Football ===
Ismail first came to prominence as a receiver for the University of Notre Dame. The Fighting Irish won the College Football National Championship in 1988, placed second in 1989 by winning the 1990 Orange Bowl against Colorado, and again went to the 1991 Orange Bowl, losing to Colorado 10–9. In that game, he returned a punt 91 yards for a touchdown that would have won the game for Notre Dame and stopped Colorado from winning a share of the National Championship; however, the play was called back on a clipping penalty sealing the Irish defeat. After the 1990 season, Ismail finished second in the voting for the Heisman Trophy as the top college football player, losing to Brigham Young University quarterback Ty Detmer.

During the 1989 regular season game against Michigan, Ismail returned two kickoffs for touchdowns. He was featured on the cover of Sports Illustrated twice, and received numerous awards, including All-American status.

The projected first overall selection in the 1991 NFL draft, Ismail decided at the last minute to sign a record contract with the Toronto Argonauts of the Canadian Football League starting during their 1991 season. As a result, he was chosen by the Los Angeles Raiders with the 100th overall pick in the draft.

=== Track and field ===
Ismail was also a track star at the University of Notre Dame, where he ran the 100 meters in 10.34 seconds. He also competed in the 55 meters, owning a personal best of 6.07 seconds. At the time, this was the tenth fastest performance in world history and the fastest time in 1991. He finished 2nd in the 55-meter dash at the 1991 NCAA Division I Indoor Track and Field Championships and received All American honors.

==== Personal bests ====
Event	Time (seconds)		Location	Meet	Date
55 meters	6.07		West Lafayette, IN	Central Collegiate Championships	February 8, 1991
100 meters	10.34		South Bend, IN	Quadrangular Meet	April 6, 1991
Event	Distance		Location	Meet	Date
Long Jump	7.28 m	23 ft 10 in	Bloomington, IN	Indiana Intercollegiates	February 18, 1989

== Professional career ==
=== Toronto Argonauts ===
After Bruce McNall purchased the Toronto Argonauts with hockey player Wayne Gretzky and actor John Candy, the Argonauts made Ismail a groundbreaking offer for a CFL player: $18.2 million over four years. The average value of his full contract, $4.55 million per season, was more than the anticipated 1991 CFL salary cap of $3.0 million per team. The CFL had a salary cap in place since 1991, but the rules contained an exemption for a "marquee player" who would not count against the cap. Doug Flutie of the BC Lions was about to be paid $1 million under the exemption, but Ismail's contract was more than anything North American football had ever seen, as his yearly salary was then the largest in Canadian or American football history. By comparison, the highest paid NFL player at the time was Joe Montana earning $3.25 million per year.

Ismail joined the Argonauts in time for the 1991 season, and in his first game, returned a kick seventy-three yards on a reverse with Michael Clemons. Ismail ended his rookie season at the 79th Grey Cup. He recorded an 87-yard touchdown on a kickoff return and was named the Grey Cup Most Valuable Player as his Argonauts defeated the Calgary Stampeders 36–21. He came within fifty yards of breaking his teammate Clemons' franchise record for single-season kickoff return yardage, and made the 1991 All-Star team as a wide receiver, finishing runner-up to Jon Volpe for rookie of the year.

In 1992 Ismail broke Clemons' franchise record for single-season kick return yards. Ismail was unhappy in Canada as the Argonauts slumped to a 6–12 record, missing the playoffs. He was also remembered for his participation in a sideline brawl against the Stampeders where he stomped an opposing player's helmeted face. He later apologized on Speaker's Corner. With the huge contract around Toronto's neck and McNall facing increasing financial trouble, Ismail left the CFL, and, after the season, signed with the Los Angeles Raiders.

=== Los Angeles/Oakland Raiders ===
Ismail was projected to be selected as the first overall pick in the 1991 NFL draft until he decided to sign with the Argonauts. The Los Angeles Raiders selected him in the fourth round (100th overall), to own his rights in case he decided to return to the NFL.

In 1993, as a rookie in the National Football League, Ismail recorded 353 receiving yards. The next year, he recorded 513 receiving yards and five touchdowns. In 1995, the Raiders' first season back in Oakland, he recorded 491 yards receiving.

On August 25, 1996, after having three disappointing seasons, Ismail was traded to the Carolina Panthers for a fifth-round pick (#157-Nick Lopez).

=== Carolina Panthers ===
In 1996 the Panthers, under head coach Dom Capers, finished 12–4, but Ismail recorded a career-low 214 yards receiving, without a single touchdown. In 1997 he recorded 419 receiving yards and two touchdowns.

In 1998, he had a breakout year, registering 69 receptions for 1,024 yards and eight touchdowns, two yards short of doubling his previous career high.

=== Dallas Cowboys ===
On March 23, 1999, the Dallas Cowboys signed him as a free agent after outbidding other teams. After Michael Irvin suffered a career-ending injury in the fourth game of the season, Ismail became the team's leading wide receiver, recording a career-high 1,097 yards and six touchdowns.

In 2000, he missed the last six games after tearing the ACL in his right knee against the Philadelphia Eagles, during the tenth game of the season, finishing with only 350 receiving yards. In 2001, he missed two games after spraining the MCL in the same injured knee against the San Diego Chargers.

On August 31, 2002, he was placed on the injured reserve list after suffering a herniated disk in his neck, due to a collision with teammate Dat Nguyen during training camp. He was released on February 26, 2003, in a salary cap move. He later announced his retirement in March.

== Career statistics ==
=== CFL ===
Year	Team	League	GP	Receiving					Rushing					Punt returns				
Year	Team	League	GP	Rec	Yds	Avg	Lng	TD	Att	Yds	Avg	Lng	TD	Ret	Yds	Avg	Lng	TD
1991	Argos	CFL	17	64	1300	20.3	87	9	36	271	7.5	42	3	48	602	12.5	73	1
1992	Argos	CFL	16	36	651	16.1	56	4	34	154	4.5	59	3	59	614	10.4	74	1
CFL Totals			33	100	1951	19.5	87	13	70	425	6.1	59	6	107	1216	11.4	74	2

=== NFL ===
Legend
**Bold**	Career high

==== Regular season ====
Year	Team	Games		Receiving				
Year	Team	GP	GS	Rec	Yds	Avg	Lng	TD
1993	RAI	13	0	26	353	13.6	43	1
1994	RAI	**16**	0	34	513	15.1	42	5
1995	OAK	**16**	**15**	28	491	17.5	73	3
1996	CAR	13	5	12	214	**17.8**	51	0
1997	CAR	13	2	36	419	11.6	59	2
1998	CAR	**16**	**15**	69	1,024	14.8	62	**8**
1999	DAL	**16**	14	**80**	**1,097**	13.7	76	6
2000	DAL	9	9	25	350	14.0	44	1
2001	DAL	14	13	53	834	15.7	**80**	2
		126	73	363	5,295	14.6	80	28

==== Playoffs ====
Year	Team	Games		Receiving				
Year	Team	GP	GS	Rec	Yds	Avg	Lng	TD
1993	RAI	1	0	0	0	0.0	0	0
1996	CAR	**2**	0	1	24	**24.0**	24	0
1999	DAL	1	**1**	**8**	**163**	20.4	**45**	0
		4	1	9	187	20.8	45	0

== Post-football career ==
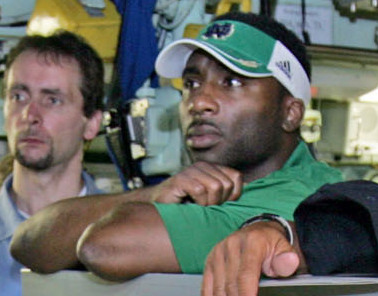
Ismail aboard USS Norfolk (SSN-714) in 2007

=== Media appearances ===
Ismail was a color analyst on ESPN's College GameDay in 2003 and 2004.

Ismail cohosted Cowboys Game Night on FSN Southwest with co-host Nate Newton and Ric Renner.

In February 2008, Ismail appeared as a Pro in the third season of Spike TV's Pros vs. Joes.

He was a contestant on Ty Murray’s Celebrity Bull Riding Challenge on CMT. In March 2010, it was announced that Ismail would be a correspondent on the show, interviewing contestants about their lives outside the competition.

=== Slamball coaching ===
In 2008, he coached the Bouncers in the extreme sports league Slamball.

== Personal life ==
Ismail is married to Melani Ismail and they have four children.

He is the older brother of former Syracuse University and NFL wide receiver Qadry Ismail, nicknamed "The Missile", and former University of Texas-El Paso and New York Dragons receiver Sulaiman Ismail, nicknamed "The Bomb". His father Ibrahim died when he was 10; his mother Fatma was sometimes referred to as "The Launch Pad" because of her sons' nicknames Rocket, Missile, and Bomb.

He converted from Islam in his early teens after his Muslim father died and he was sent to live with his grandmother, a member of an Assemblies of God church. Ismail has been described as a "devout Christian".

Ismail is now an inspirational speaker, and speaks for corporations, schools and churches.

His son, Raghib Jr., played at Wyoming. His nephew Qadir Ismail is currently a tight end for the Chicago Bears.
