= USS Robison =

Charles F. Adams-class destroyer

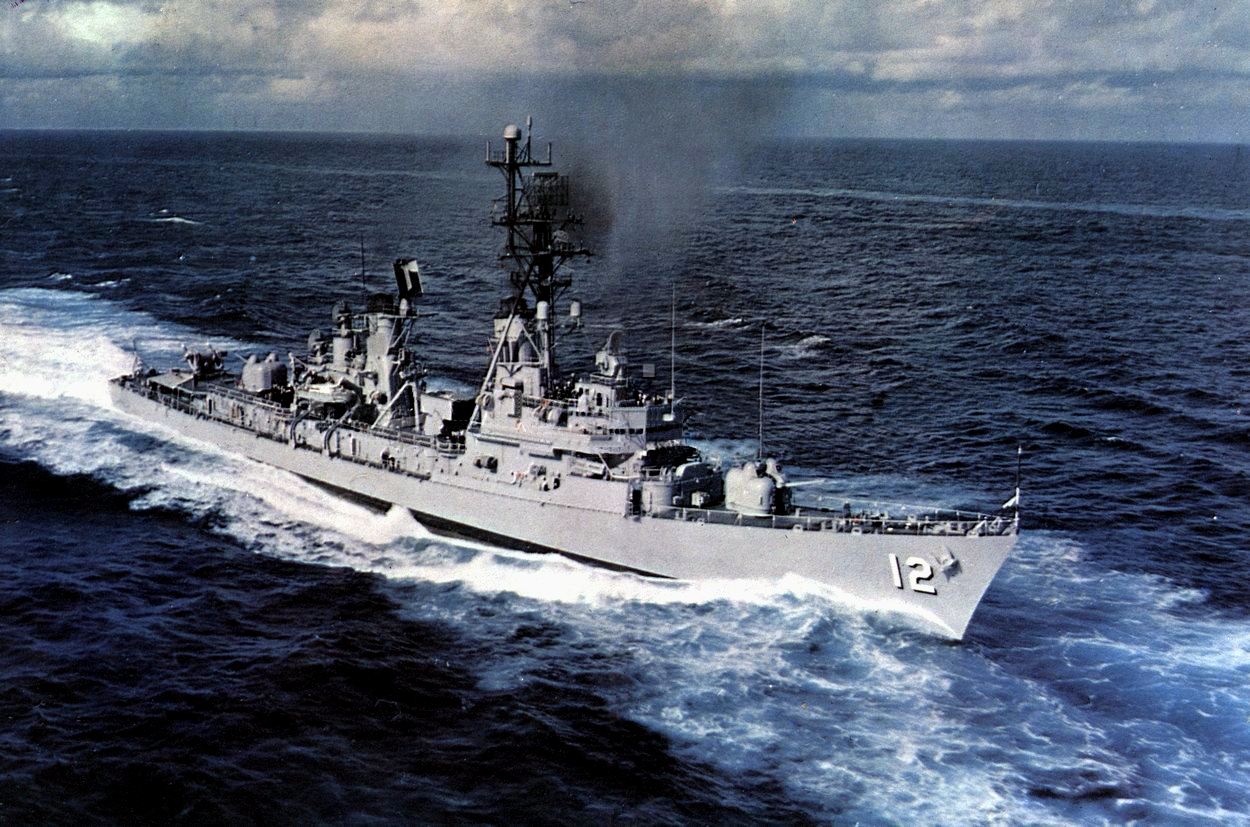
- USS Robison underway in 1966

History

United States
- Name: Robison
- Namesake: Samuel Shelburne Robison
- Ordered: 17 January 1958
- Builder: Defoe Shipbuilding Company
- Laid down: 28 April 1959
- Launched: 27 April 1960
- Acquired: 29 November 1961
- Commissioned: 9 December 1961
- Decommissioned: 1 October 1991
- Stricken: 20 November 1992
- Identification: Callsign: NBZO; Hull number: DDG-12
- Honors and awards: See Awards
- Fate: Scrapped, 20 June 1994

General characteristics
- Class & type: Charles F. Adams-class destroyer
- Displacement: 3,277 tons standard, 4,526 full load
- Length: 437 ft (133 m)
- Beam: 47 ft (14 m)
- Draft: 15 ft (4.6 m)
- Propulsion: 2 × General Electric steam turbines providing 70,000 shp (52 MW); 2 shafts; 4 × Babcock & Wilcox 1,275 psi (8,790 kPa) boilers
- Speed: 33 knots (61 km/h; 38 mph)
- Range: 4,500 nautical miles (8,300 km) at 20 knots (37 km/h)
- Complement: 354 (24 officers, 330 enlisted)
- Sensors & processing systems: AN/SPS-39 3D air search radar; AN/SPS-10 surface search radar; AN/SPG-51 missile fire control radar; AN/SPG-53 gunfire control radar; AN/SQS-23 Sonar and the hull mounted SQQ-23 Pair Sonar for DDG-2 through 19; AN/SPS-40 Air Search Radar
- Armament: 1 Mk 11 missile launcher (DDG2-14) or Mk 13 single arm missile launcher (DDG-15-24) for RIM-24 Tartar SAM system, or later the RIM-66 Standard (SM-1) and Harpoon antiship missile; 2 × 5"/54 caliber Mark 42 (127 mm) gun; 1 × RUR-5 ASROC Launcher; 6 × 12.8 in (324 mm) ASW Torpedo Tubes (2 × Mark 32 Surface Vessel Torpedo Tubes)

USS Robison (DDG-12), named for Rear Admiral Samuel Shelburne Robison, was a Charles F. Adams-class guided missile armed destroyer in the service of the United States Navy.

== Construction and career ==
Robison was laid down by Defoe Shipbuilding Company in Bay City, Michigan on 28 April 1959, launched on 27 April 1960 by Mrs. John H. Sides, wife of the Commander-in-Chief, Pacific Fleet, and commissioned on 9 December 1961 at the Boston Naval Shipyard.

=== 1960s ===
Robison served as plane guard for carriers on Yankee Station in the Tonkin Gulf, participated in Sea Dragon operations, patrolled on search and rescue duties and carried out Naval Gunfire Support missions during the Vietnam War.

Robison steamed for the west coast 29 January 1962 via the Panama Canal. On 1 March she received a message diverting her to Clipperton Island, to rescue 10 stranded seamen from the tuna boat Monarch, which had capsized 20 days earlier.

Arriving at San Diego on 7 March, Robison underwent shakedown and then post-shakedown availability 14 June in San Francisco. Fleet Adm. Chester W. Nimitz, who had twice served on Admiral Robison's staff, visited the ship on 25 June.

Following completion of availability 31 July, Robison proceeded to Mare Island Naval Shipyard for ammunition, took on ASROC and Tartar missiles at Seal Beach, and then commenced 3 months of local training operations out of San Diego. She got underway with Cruiser-Destroyer Flotilla 11 on 13 November for her first WestPac tour of duty. Upon completion of this deployment, Robison arrived San Diego 21 June 1963 for coastal operations.

She departed San Diego 18 November in company with USS Parsons (DD-949) for escort duties. Calling at Pearl Harbor 23 November, she departed 2 days later in company with USS Midway (CV-41). Upon detachment from Midway, she touched at Guam, and then escorted USS Hancock (CV-19) eastward. Following fueling stops at Midway Island and Pearl Harbor, she arrived San Diego 19 December.

In January 1964 Robison entered Long Beach Naval Shipyard for regular overhaul. After missile qualifications and refresher training, she steamed 14 August for her second WestPac deployment. Following her successful participation in modern naval warfare training exercises and calls at various Far Eastern ports, she departed Yokosuka 24 January 1965 and arrived San Diego 6 February.

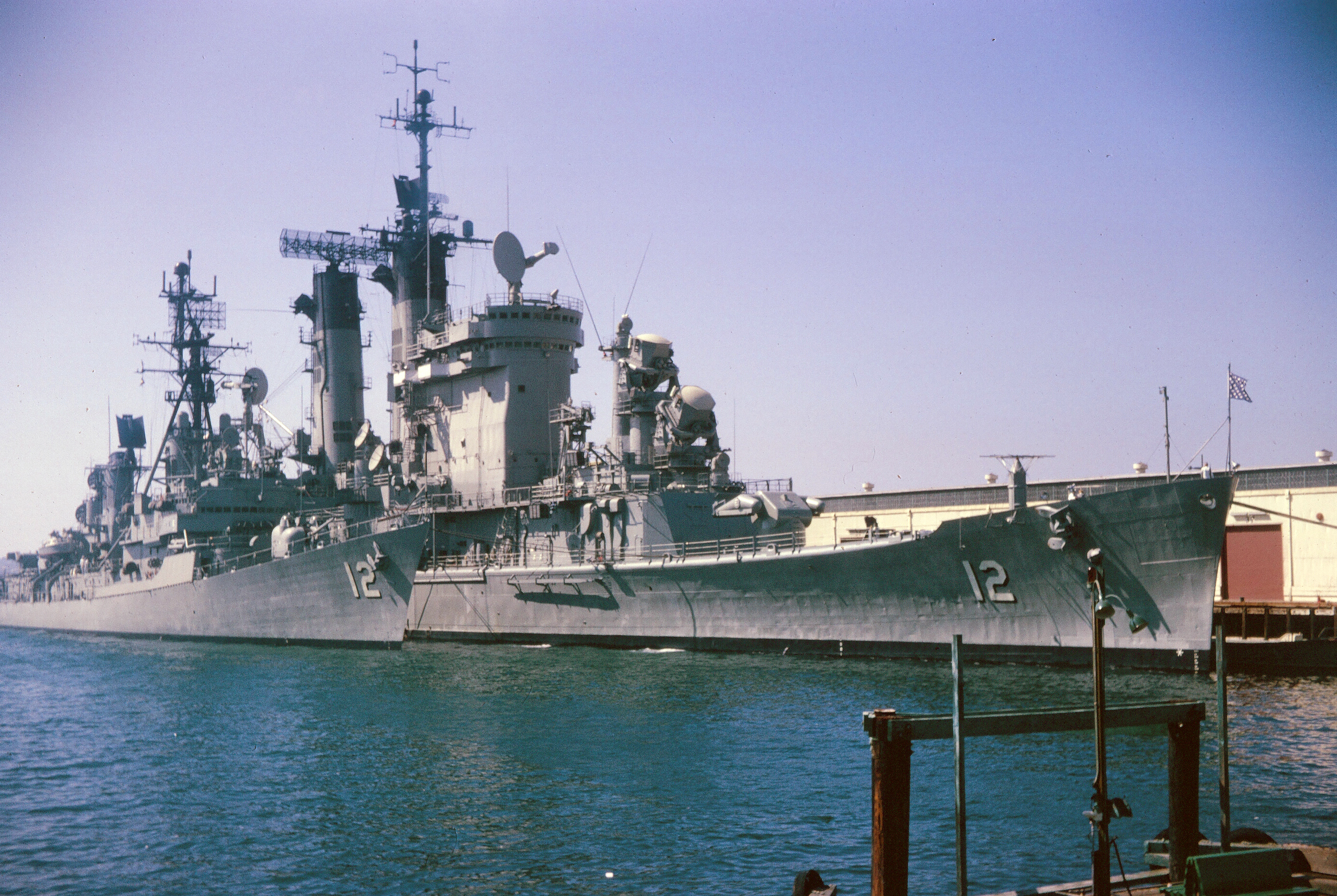
USS Robison (DDG-12) (left) and USS Columbus (GG-12) (right) in San Diego Harbor, June 1965

Local spring operations were followed by a midshipman training cruise from 10 June to 5 August. The latter month also brought a call at Portland, Oreg., and a visit, on the 24th, by the Chief of Naval Operations, Adm. David L. McDonald. In the fall she sharpened her ASW, AAW, and shore bombardment techniques during coastal operations. Early in the new year 1966, the destroyer prepared for her third tour of duty in support of 7th Fleet operations in WestPac.

That deployment ended with her return to San Diego 18 July 1966. Overhaul in San Francisco took her through the fall and into the winter months, culminating in her return to homeport on 3 February 1967. Refresher and type training filled the next 5 months, and 25 July saw Robison once again en route to the Orient.

After calling at Pearl Harbor 31 July and Yokosuka, Japan, 5 August, she commenced Tonkin Gulf operations under the command of Thomas William McNamara on 25 August in the screen for USS Coral Sea (CV-43). In naval gunfire support and "Sea Dragon" operations during the period from 26 August 1967 to 9 January 1968, Robison was credited with the destruction of 78 waterborne logistics craft. Her remarkable degree of combat readiness during this period earned for her the Meritorious Unit Commendation.

Upkeep, availability, training, and operating off the west coast maintained Robison's state of readiness through the next 11 months. She steamed from San Diego for her fifth WestPac deployment on 30 December 1968 in company with carrier Kitty Hawk. The usual call at Pearl Harbor was followed by arrival at Subic Bay, 20 January 1969. After voyage repairs Robison joined Task Group 77.3 in Tonkin Gulf. The destroyer, flagship of her division, served in the screen of both Kitty Hawk and Bon Homme Richard. She also provided naval gunfire support to troops ashore in the I Corps Zone.

Robison returned to San Diego on 6 July 1969, remaining there until 2 October, when she arrived at the San Francisco Naval Shipyard, Hunters Point, for overhaul. Work was completed 4½ months later, and Robison returned to her homeport of San Diego 27 February 1970, ready for refresher training and yet another WestPac deployment.

=== 1970–1980 ===
With the advent of 1970, Robison began a cycle of deployments which endured for three years. She spent the spring of each year on the west coast of the United States and then, in late spring or early summer, she deployed to WestPac. This cycle continued until 1973. During that year she remained on the west coast, engaged in normal operations out of San Diego, where she was berthed as of January 1974.

After fighting in Vietnam in the '60s, she participated in the rescue of two groups of Vietnamese refugees in 1980. The first group was spotted while doing maneuvers with the Thai Navy in the South China Sea. When the Robison arrived that evening only 262 people survived of the 300+ that disembarked from Vietnam to escape the horrors of their homeland. Many died during their ordeal in the sea or ended their lives after giving up hope before the Robison arrived. These refugees were "housed" under tarps on the gun deck of the Robison, cared for and nursed back to health by members of the crew until permission was granted to take them to Thailand to be processed and, eventually, taken to the United States. Within weeks of rescuing the first group, a second group was spotted with a very small contingent of people; 21 to be precise. The seas were stormy so the people were taken below decks and cared for as the ship transited to the Philippines where they would be processed for emigration to the United States. The members of her crew received the Humanitarian Service Medal.

=== Decommissioning ===
The guided missile destroyer decommissioned on 1 October 1991, was struck from the navy list on 20 November 1992 and sold to Consolidated Metals, Inc., for scrapping.

Robison was decommissioned on 1 October 1991, stricken from the Naval Vessel Register on 20 November 1992 and sold for scrap on 20 June 1994. The plan was that it would be converted to a power barge with her sister ship, the USS Hoel (DDG-13). That plan for Robison was apparently changed after the power barge failure of the Hoel.

The hull of the Robison eventually was sunk off the coast of South Carolina as part of the Marine Resources Division of the South Carolina Department of Natural Resources artificial fishing reef project. The hull of Robison is now located at 32°29.271′N 080°00.074′W.

== Awards ==
Robison earned seven battle stars for service off the Vietnamese coast.
