= Joseph F. Perugino =

US Army major general

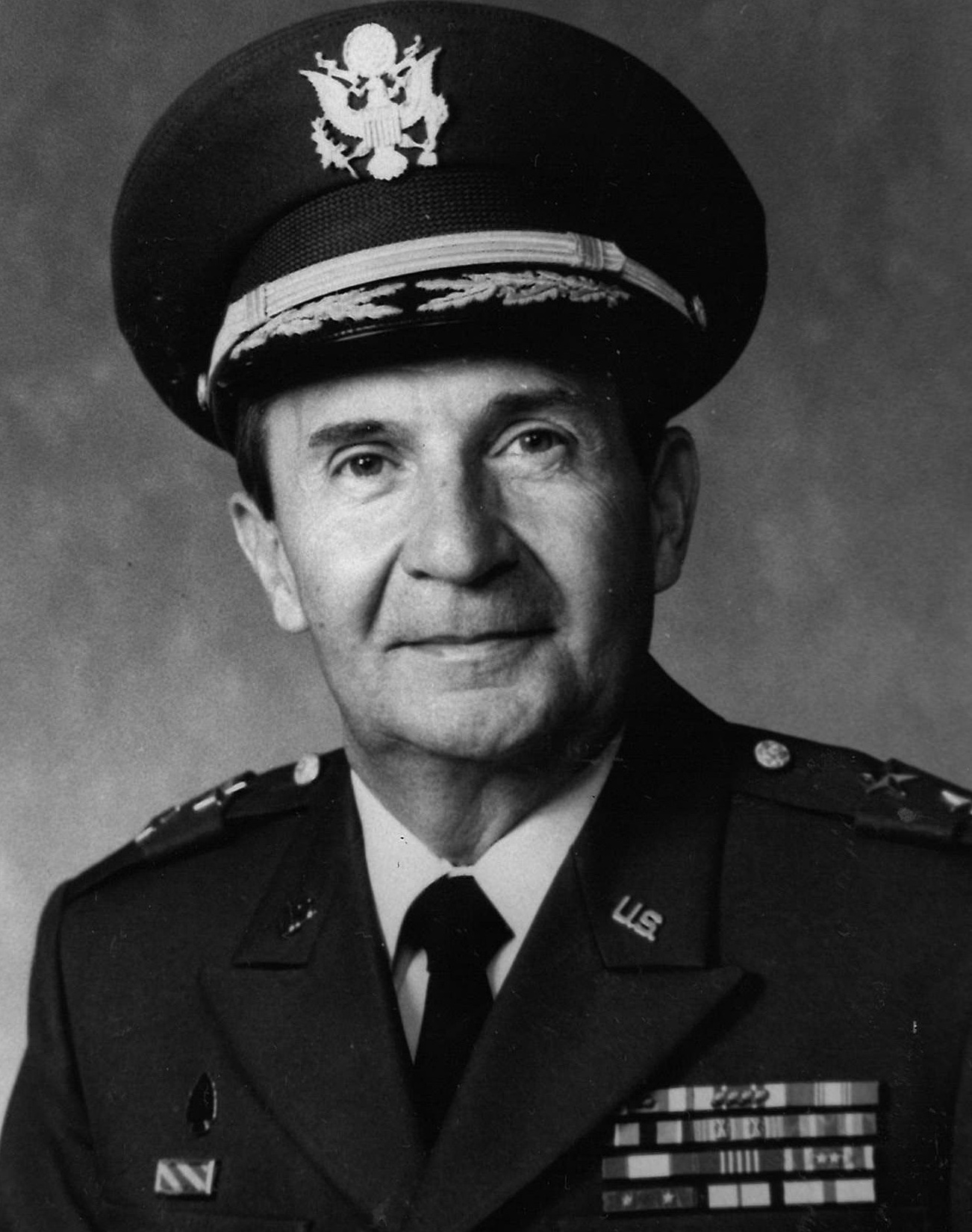
- Perugino as commander of the 28th Infantry Division, c. 1994
- Born: August 15, 1938 (age 88); Wilkes-Barre, Pennsylvania, US
- Alma mater: Cumberland College; United States Army Command and General Staff College; United States Army War College
- Spouse(s): Charlotte Howard (m. 1960–1982) Mary Ann Panasiewich (m. 1983)
- Children: 1
- Military career
- Service: United States Army; Pennsylvania Army National Guard
- Service years: 1956–1998
- Rank: Major General
- Unit: U.S. Army Field Artillery Branch
- Commands: Battery A, 1st Battalion, 109th Field Artillery Regiment; 1st Battalion, 109th Field Artillery Regiment; 28th Infantry Division Artillery; 28th Infantry Division
- Awards: Army Distinguished Service Medal
- Other work: President, Energy Resources, Inc. Vice President of Administration and Marketing, Pennsylvania Gas and Water Company; President, Theta Land Corporation

Joseph F. Perugino (born 15 August 1938) is a retired United States Army officer and business executive from Pennsylvania. A longtime member of the Pennsylvania Army National Guard, he attained the rank of major general and commanded the 28th Infantry Division from 1994 to 1996. Perugino retired in 1998, and his awards and decorations included the Army Distinguished Service Medal and Legion of Merit.

A native of Wilkes-Barre, Pennsylvania, Perugino was educated in Wilkes-Barre and graduated from Elmer L. Meyers Junior/Senior High School. He attended King's College in Wilkes-Barre, then worked in his family's restaurant business. He later worked as a corporate executive, primarily as a vice president of the Pennsylvania Gas and Water Company. In 1988, he completed a Bachelor of Business Administration degree at Cumberland College in Kentucky (now the University of the Cumberlands.

Perugino enlisted in the Pennsylvania Army National Guard and advanced though the ranks from private to sergeant first class before attending officer candidate school. After receiving his commission as a second lieutenant of Field Artillery, he advanced through the ranks and commanded a battery, a battalion, and a brigade. He became a brigadier general in 1988, and was promoted to major general in 1992. Perugino commanded the 28th Infantry Division from 1994 to 1996, then served a second tour as deputy commander of Pennsylvania's Joint Force Headquarters. Perugino retired from the military in 1998 and resided in Kingston, Pennsylvania.

== Early life ==
Joseph Frank Perugino was born in Wilkes-Barre, Pennsylvania on 15 August 1938, the son of Joseph F. Perugino Sr. and Jane Rosemary (Wende) Perugino. He was raised and educated in Wilkes-Barre, and graduated from Elmer L. Meyers Junior/Senior High School in 1956. After high school, Perugino attended Wilkes-Barre's King's College and worked for his family's restaurant business. In 1988, Perugino completed a Bachelor of Business Administration degree at Kentucky's Cumberland College.

In September 1955, Perugino began his military career by enlisting as a private in the Pennsylvania Army National Guard's 1st Battalion, 109th Field Artillery Regiment. He advanced through the ranks to sergeant first class, then attended officer candidate school, from which he graduated in June 1966. After graduating, Perugino received his commission as a second lieutenant of Field Artillery.

=== Family ===
In February 1960, Perugino married Charlotte Howard of Luzerne. They were the parents of a son, Joseph R. Perugino. She died in September 1982, and in October 1983, Perugino married Mary Ann Panasiewich.

== Start of career ==
In Perugino's civilian career, he was a corporate manager and executive whose positions included president of Energy Resources, Inc., vice president of administration and marketing for the Pennsylvania Gas and Water Company, and president of Theta Land Corporation. After receiving his National Guard commission, served as liaison officer on the staff of 1st Battalion, 109th Field Artillery from June to August 1966. From September 1966 to October 1967, he was assigned as reconnaissance and survey officer at Headquarters and Headquarters Battery, 1-109th Field Artillery. From October 1967 to September 1967, he was executive officer of Battery B, 1-109th Field Artillery. Perugino was executive officer of 1-109th Field Artillery's Battery D from September 1969 to June 1970. In June 1969, he received promotion to first lieutenant.

=== Military education ===
The professional education Perugino completed during his military career included:

- Field Artillery Officer Basic Course (1968)
- Field Artillery Officer Advanced Course (1972)
- Field Artillery Staff Officer Refresher Course (1975)
- Division Artillery Staff Officer Refresher Course (1977)
- United States Army Command and General Staff College (1977)
- Towed Field Artillery Battalion Refresher Course (1979)
- Field Artillery Battalion Refresher Course (1981)
- United States Army War College (1985)
- NATO Counter-Contingency Training Program (1993)

== Continued career ==
Perugino was commander of Battery 1st Battalion, 109th Field Artillery from July 1970 to February 1977, and he was promoted to captain in June 1971. He was promoted to major in February 1977, and from February 1977 to December 1980 he served first as plans, operations, and training officer (S-3) on the 1-109th Field Artillery staff, and later as the battalion's executive officer. He commanded 1st Battalion, 109th Field Artillery from Dec 1980 to November 1985, and he was promoted to lieutenant colonel in February 1981. From November 1985 to August 1988, Perugino was commander of the 28th Infantry Division Artillery, and he received promotion to colonel in December 1985.

In August 1988, Perugino was assigned as Pennsylvania's assistant adjutant general for army, and he was promoted to brigadier general in May 1989. From February 1991 to October 1994, he served as deputy commander of Pennsylvania's State Area Command, and he was promoted to major general in October 1992. In October 1994, Perugino was selected to succeed Daniel J. O'Neill as commander of the 28th Infantry Division, and he served in this position until October 1996. From October 1996 until retiring in August 1998, Perugino again served as deputy commander of the State Area Command.

As a resident of Kingston, Pennsylvania, Perugino's civic memberships included vice chairman of the advisory board for Pennsylvania State University's Wilkes-Barre campus, member of the economic growth committee for the American Red Cross's Luzerne Valley chapter, board of trustees for Luzerne County Community College Foundation, board of directors for the Northeastern Council of the Boy Scouts of America, board of directors for the F. M. Kirby Center theater, Broadway Theater of Northeastern Pennsylvania, and Crime Clinic of Greater Wyoming Valley. He also served as chairman of the local United Way's supplemental fundraising committee and was a trustee of the Wilkes-Barre and Wyoming Valley Veterans Hospital Fund. Among his business affiliations was the Wilkes-Barre Chamber of Commerce, Greater Scranton Chamber of Commerce, Economic Development Council of Northeastern Pennsylvania, the Scranton chapter of the Unico National Italian-American service organization, the Westmoreland Club, the Pennsylvania Gas Association, and the American Gas Association. His military affiliations included the National Guard Association of the United States, Pennsylvania National Guard Association, Reserve Officers Association, Association of the United States Army, American Legion, and AMVETS. He was also active in fraternal organizations including the Freemasons, Shriners, and Royal Order of Jesters.

== Awards ==
Perugino's federal awards and decorations included:

- Army Distinguished Service Medal
- Legion of Merit
- Meritorious Service Medal with 1 bronze oak leaf cluster
- Army Commendation Medal with 1 oak leaf cluster
- Army Reserve Components Achievement Medal with 4 bronze oak leaf clusters
- National Defense Service Medal
- Humanitarian Service Medal with 1 silver service star
- Military Outstanding Volunteer Service Medal
- Armed Forces Reserve Medal with 1 gold hourglass device
- Army Service Ribbon

Perugino's state awards included:

- Pennsylvania Distinguished Service Medal with 2 silver service stars
- Governor's Unit Citation
- Pennsylvania Service Ribbon with 4 silver service stars

Pennsylvania 20 Year Service medal with 2 silver service stars

- General Thomas J. Stewart Medal
- General Thomas R. White Medal

== Dates of rank ==
Perugino's dates of rank were:

- Major General (retired), 30 August 1998
- Major General, 6 October 1992
- Brigadier General, 11 May 1989
- Colonel, 3 December 1985
- Lieutenant Colonel, 24 February 1981
- Major, 4 February 1977
- Captain, 27 June 1971
- First Lieutenant, 11 June 1969
- Second Lieutenant, 12 June 1966
