= Ron Solt =

American football player (born 1962)

No. 66, 65
- Position: Guard

Personal information
- Born: May 19, 1962 (age 64); Bainbridge, Maryland, U.S.
- Listed height: 6 ft 3 in (1.91 m)
- Listed weight: 279 lb (127 kg)

Career information
- High school: James M. Coughlin (Wilkes-Barre, Pennsylvania)
- College: Maryland
- NFL draft: 1984: 1st round, 19th overall pick

Career history
- Indianapolis Colts (1984–1988); Philadelphia Eagles (1988–1991); Indianapolis Colts (1992–1993)

Awards and highlights
- Second-team All-Pro (1987); Pro Bowl (1987); PFWA All-Rookie Team (1984); First-team All-American (1983); First-team All-ACC (1983)

Career NFL statistics
- Games played: 116
- Games started: 113
- Fumble recoveries: 2
- Stats at Pro Football Reference

Ronald Matthew Solt (born May 19, 1962) is an American former professional football player who was a guard in the National Football League (NFL). He played college football for the Maryland Terrapins and was selected in the first round of the 1984 NFL draft with the 19th overall pick. Solt played in the NFL for the Indianapolis Colts and the Philadelphia Eagles.

== Biography ==
Solt was born in Bainbridge, Maryland and graduated from James M. Coughlin High School in Wilkes-Barre, Pennsylvania. He played college football at the University of Maryland, where, as a senior, he was named a first-team All-American by Gannett News Service (GNS).

He was drafted in the first round (19th overall) of the 1984 NFL draft. The Colts selected Solt with the draft pick received in the trade with the Denver Broncos, which had been forced by John Elway after he refused to play in Baltimore the year prior.

After making the Pro Bowl in 1987, Solt became entangled in a contract dispute and held out through the first month of the 1988 season, then was traded to the Philadelphia Eagles for their 1989 first-round pick and their 1990 fourth-round pick. Solt was suspended for four games at the beginning of the 1990 season for steroid use. Solt re-signed with the Colts as a Plan B free agent in 1992.
