= Qadry Ismail =

American football player (born 1970)

No. 82, 86, 87, 83
- Position: Wide receiver

Personal information
- Born: November 8, 1970 (age 55); Newark, New Jersey, U.S.
- Listed height: 6 ft 0 in (1.83 m)
- Listed weight: 196 lb (89 kg)

Career information
- High school: Meyers (Wilkes-Barre, Pennsylvania)
- College: Syracuse (1989–1992)
- NFL draft: 1993: 2nd round, 52nd overall pick

Career history
- Minnesota Vikings (1993–1996); Green Bay Packers (1997)*; Miami Dolphins (1997); New Orleans Saints (1998); Baltimore Ravens (1999–2001); Indianapolis Colts (2002)
- * Offseason or practice squad member only

Awards and highlights
- Super Bowl champion (XXXV); First-team All-American (1991); First-team All-East (1991); Second-team All-East (1989)

Career NFL statistics
- Receptions: 353
- Receiving yards: 5,137
- Receiving touchdowns: 33
- Stats at Pro Football Reference

Qadry Rahmadan Ismail (born November 8, 1970), nicknamed "the Missile", is an American former professional football player who was a wide receiver in the National Football League (NFL). He played college football for the Syracuse Orange, earning first-team All-American honors in 1991. He was selected by the Minnesota Vikings in the second round (52nd overall) of the 1993 NFL draft.

He also played for the Miami Dolphins, New Orleans Saints, Baltimore Ravens (with which he won Super Bowl XXXV), and the Indianapolis Colts.

== Early life ==
Qadry Rahmadan Ismail was born on November 8, 1970, in Newark, New Jersey, the son of Ibrahim and Fat'ma Ismail. In 1985, he moved to his grandmother Laura Bauknight's home in Wilkes-Barre, Pennsylvania, where he attended Elmer L. Meyers Junior/Senior High School. There, Ismail and his older brother Raghib "Rocket" Ismail were named the inaugural recipients of the Martin Luther King Youth Leadership Award given by the local chapter of the NAACP of Northeast Pennsylvania. In addition to playing high school football, Ismail also ran track.

As a member of the track team, he was ranked the nation's best high school hurdler by Track & Field News in 1988. He finished first at the 110 m high hurdles Golden West Invitational. He was also a two time state team champion in track and field. He was a six-time PIAA AA State champion in the 110 m high hurdles, 300 m intermediate hurdles, and 4 × 100. He was a two-time PIAA AA silver medalist in the 4 × 400, as well as a bronze medalist in the 110 m high hurdles. He was a four time PIAA District II team champion, and 12 time PIAA District II champion. He also earned two WVC team conference championships.

As a member of the football team, he was a two time All-scholastic selection as a wide receiver and defensive back. He was inducted into the PIAA Coaches Association Hall of Fame. He was named the 1988 Athlete of the Year by The Citizens' Voice and the Times Leader.

== College career ==
Ismail attended Syracuse University, where he was a member of the football team as well as the track team. Ismail was the first two-sport All-American at Syracuse since Jim Brown in 1957.

As a member of the Syracuse Orange track and field team, Ismail was an All-American in the indoor 55 m hurdles, as well as the outdoor 110 m hurdles. He was also an IC4A 110 m hurdle and 55 m hurdle champion. Ismail was also the Big East champion in the 110 m hurdles, as well as the 55 m hurdle and 4 × 400 relay while also setting Syracuse University's school record in the 55 m hurdles and the 4x400 relay.

As a member of the football team, Ismail was an All-American selection as a kick returner in 1991. He was also a first team All-Big East selection as a wide receiver and kickoff returner, and a second team all-Big East selection as wide receiver.

=== Career statistics ===
Year	Team	GP	Receiving				Rushing				Kick returns			
Year	Team	GP	Rec	Yds	Avg	TD	Att	Yds	Avg	TD	Ret	Yds	Avg	TD
1989	Syracuse	11	0	0	0.0	0	0	0	0.0	0	33	738	22.4	0
1990	Syracuse	11	0	0	0.0	0	0	0	0.0	0	32	699	21.8	0
1991	Syracuse	11	37	693	18.7	3	12	216	18.0	3	19	475	25.0	1
1992	Syracuse	11	36	625	17.4	2	22	217	9.9	3	21	378	18.0	0
Career		44	73	1,318	18.1	5	34	433	12.7	6	105	2,290	21.8	1

== Professional career ==
Pre-draft measurables
Height	Weight	Arm length	Hand span	40-yard dash	10-yard split	20-yard split	Vertical jump
6 ft 0 1/2 in (1.84 m)	192 lb (87 kg)	31 5/8 in (0.80 m)	9 3/4 in (0.25 m)	4.49 s	1.59 s	2.62 s	35.0 in (0.89 m)

Ismail was selected in the second round (52nd overall) of the 1993 NFL draft by the Minnesota Vikings, becoming the highest drafted Syracuse player since Moose Johnston.

In 1999, Ismail was voted Number 22 on the list of top 100 athletes by the Citizen’s Voice.

In 1999 with the Baltimore Ravens, Ismail led the team with 68 catches, 1,105 receiving yards and 6 touchdowns, including career-high 258 yards in one game against the Pittsburgh Steelers. What might have been the high-water mark of Ismail's career and potential crowning moment came on January 28, 2001, when the Baltimore Ravens defeated the New York Giants 34–7 in Tampa, Florida, in Super Bowl XXXV. Ismail caught a 47-yard reception and earned his first Super Bowl ring.

In 2002, Ismail signed a one-year deal with the Indianapolis Colts as a #2 wide receiver behind fellow Syracuse alum, Marvin Harrison.

== NFL career statistics ==
Legend
	Won the Super Bowl
**Bold**	Career high

Regular season

Year	Team	Games		Receiving					Rushing					Kickoff returns					Fumbles	
Year	Team	GP	GS	Rec	Yds	Avg	Lng	TD	Att	Yds	Avg	Lng	TD	Ret	Yds	Avg	Lng	TD	Fum	Lost
1993	MIN	15	3	19	212	11.2	37	1	**3**	**14**	4.7	6	0	**42**	902	21.5	47	0	1	1
1994	MIN	16	3	45	696	15.5	65	5	–	–	–	–	–	35	807	23.1	61	0	2	**2**
1995	MIN	16	1	32	597	**18.7**	**85**	3	1	7	**7.0**	**7**	0	**42**	**1,037**	**24.7**	**71**	0	**3**	**2**
1996	MIN	16	2	22	351	16.0	54	3	–	–	–	–	–	28	527	18.8	32	0	2	0
1997	MIA	3	0	0	0	0.0	0	0	–	–	–	–	–	8	166	20.8	27	0	0	0
1998	NO	10	1	0	0	0.0	0	0	–	–	–	–	–	28	590	21.1	39	0	2	1
1999	BAL	16	16	68	**1,105**	16.3	76	6	1	4	4.0	4	0	4	55	13.8	19	0	2	0
2000	BAL	15	13	49	655	13.4	53	5	–	–	–	–	–	2	51	25.5	38	0	0	0
2001	BAL	16	15	**74**	1,059	14.3	77	**7**	–	–	–	–	–	–	–	–	–	–	1	1
2002	IND	14	14	44	462	10.5	42	3	–	–	–	–	–	–	–	–	–	–	0	0
Career		137	68	353	5,137	14.6	85	33	5	25	5.0	7	0	189	4,135	21.9	71	0	13	7

Playoffs

Year	Team	Games		Receiving					Rushing					Kickoff returns					Fumbles	
Year	Team	GP	GS	Rec	Yds	Avg	Lng	TD	Att	Yds	Avg	Lng	TD	Ret	Yds	Avg	Lng	TD	Fum	Lost
1993	MIN	1	0	1	6	6.0	6	0	–	–	–	–	–	4	47	11.8	22	0	1	0
1994	MIN	1	0	3	29	9.7	20	0	–	–	–	–	–	–	–	–	–	–	0	0
1996	MIN	1	0	3	78	**26.0**	**50**	0	–	–	–	–	–	–	–	–	–	–	0	0
1997	MIA	0	0	did not play																
2000	BAL	4	4	**9**	**150**	16.7	44	0	1	-4	-4.0	-4	0	–	–	–	–	–	0	0
2001	BAL	2	2	2	24	12.0	16	0	–	–	–	–	–	–	–	–	–	–	0	0
2002	IND	0	0	did not play due to injury																
Career		9	6	18	287	15.9	50	0	1	-4	-4.0	-4	0	4	47	11.8	22	0	1	0

== Broadcast career ==
After retiring from the NFL, Ismail began a career in broadcasting, spending time with Comcast Sports Net, BET Black College Football, and ESPN before becoming part of the Ravens’ broadcast team. In March 2017, it was announced that Ismail would be a color commentator for the Baltimore Brigade of the Arena Football League.

== Personal life ==
Ismail is the brother of Raghib "The Rocket" Ismail and Sulaiman "The Bomb" Ismail. He has three children Qalea, Qadry, and Qadir from his marriage to Holly Oslander Ismail. Ismail is a sports performance coach (Missile Training) at the Sports Factory in Bel Air, Maryland. He has worked with hundreds of athletes helping them improve on their fitness and speed.

Ismail served as the head coach of the Patterson Mill High School boys track and field team from 2011 to 2019. His daughter, Qalea, plays basketball at Princeton University. In 2017, his son, Qadry, began playing wide receiver at Mercyhurst University. In December 2017, his son, Qadir, signed to play quarterback at Villanova, before transferring to play at Samford. Qadir is currently a tight end for the Chicago Bears.
