= Phil Ostrowski =

American football player (born 1975)

No. 69
- Position: Guard

Personal information
- Born: September 23, 1975 (age 51); Wilkes-Barre, Pennsylvania, U.S.
- Listed height: 6 ft 4 in (1.93 m)
- Listed weight: 291 lb (132 kg)

Career information
- High school: Meyers (Wilkes-Barre)
- College: Penn State (1993–1997)
- NFL draft: 1998: 5th round, 151st overall pick

Career history
- San Francisco 49ers (1998–2000); Denver Broncos (2001)*
- * Offseason or practice squad member only

Awards and highlights
- First-team All-Big Ten (1997)

Career NFL statistics
- Games played: 28
- Stats at Pro Football Reference

Phillip Lucas Ostrowski (born September 23, 1975) is an American former professional football player who was an offensive guard for two seasons with the San Francisco 49ers of the National Football League (NFL). He was selected by the 49ers in the fifth round of the 1998 NFL draft after playing college football for the Penn State Nittany Lions. He was also a member of the Denver Broncos.

== Early life and college ==
Phillip Lucas Ostrowski was born on September 23, 1975, in Wilkes-Barre, Pennsylvania. He attended Elmer L. Meyers Junior/Senior High School in Wilkes-Barre. He was a team captain in football, a three-year starter in basketball, and a thrower in track and field.

Ostrowski was a member of the Nittany Lions of Pennsylvania State University from 1993 to 1997. He was redshirted in 1993 and was a letterman from 1996 to 1997. He was named first-team All-Big Ten by both the Coaches and Media his senior year in 1997.

== Professional career ==
Ostrowski was selected by the San Francisco 49ers in the fifth round, with the 151st overall pick, of the 1998 NFL draft. He officially signed with the team on July 18. He spent the 1998 season on the 49ers' active roster but did not appear in any games. Ostrowski played in 15 games in 1999 and 13 games in 2000. He was released by the 49ers on February 19, 2001.

Ostrowski signed with the Denver Broncos on April 6, 2001. Ostrowski was released by the Broncos on August 28, 2001.
