= Bruce Kozerski =

American football player (born 1962)

No. 64
- Positions: Center, guard, tackle

Personal information
- Born: April 2, 1962 (age 64); Plains, Pennsylvania, U.S.
- Listed height: 6 ft 4 in (1.93 m)
- Listed weight: 287 lb (130 kg)

Career information
- High school: James M. Coughlin (Wilkes-Barre, Pennsylvania)
- College: Holy Cross
- NFL draft: 1984: 9th round, 231st overall pick

Career history
- Cincinnati Bengals (1984–1995)

Career NFL statistics
- Games played: 172
- Games started: 137
- Fumble recoveries: 4
- Stats at Pro Football Reference

Bruce Kozerski (born April 2, 1962) is an American former professional football player who was a center for 12 seasons with the Cincinnati Bengals of the National Football League (NFL). He played college football for the Holy Cross Crusaders.

He graduated from James M. Coughlin High School in Wilkes-Barre, Pennsylvania. He graduated from the College of the Holy Cross in Worcester, MA with a major in Physics and later acquired a Master's in teaching from Xavier University. He was an alternate in the 1988, 1989, and 1990 Pro Bowls. "Mr. Versatile", as he was called, retired after the 1995 season. He is a teacher at Holy Cross High School in Covington, Kentucky where he teaches physics, pre-calculus, and calculus. He is also the head football coach at Holy Cross as well. He lives in Edgewood, Kentucky.

On November 25, 2011, Kozerski, in his eighth year as head coach, led Holy Cross High School's Covington football team to the Kentucky High School Athletic Association Division 2A, state football championship. It was the Indians' first appearance in the state championship game. Holy Cross defeated Glasgow High School 33–14 in the championship game.

Kozerski was inducted into the Kentucky Pro Football Hall of Fame in 2017.
