= The John Carroll School =

Catholic high school in Maryland, US

Location
- 703 Churchville Road; Bel Air, Maryland 21014; United States; 39°32′20″N 76°19′59″W

Information
- Type: Private, college preparatory
- Religious affiliation: Catholic
- Established: September 9, 1964
- President: Steve DiBiagio
- Principal: Carl Patton
- Grades: 9–12
- Colors: Black & gold
- Nickname: Patriots
- Publication: Pinnacle (literary magazine)
- Newspaper: The Patriot
- Yearbook: Pacificus
- Endowment: $13.32 Million
- Tuition: $19,500
- Website: www.johncarroll.org

The John Carroll School Inc., established in 1964 and incorporated in 1971, is a private Catholic school for grades 9–12. It is located in Bel Air, Harford County, Maryland, United States. It is in the Archdiocese of Baltimore.

== History ==
In the early 1960s Lawrence Shehan decided to build an Archdiocesan Catholic high school on an 87-acre (350,000 m^{2}) site in Bel Air. The John Carroll School opened to 202 freshmen on September 9, 1964, under the leadership of Raymond Wanner. From its earliest days, the school was run both by clergy and lay people.

The school is named after John Theodore Carroll, the first Catholic bishop and archbishop in the United States, serving as the ordinary of the Roman Catholic Archdiocese of Baltimore.

== Notable alumni ==
- Roman Hemby, college football player for the Indiana Hoosiers and Oakland Raiders
- Qadir Ismail, NFL football tight end
- Kimbal Mackenzie, basketball coach
- Austin Brinkman, long snapper for the Houston Texans
- Elijah Mitrou-Long (born 1996), Canadian-Greek basketball player for Hapoel Holon of the Israeli Basketball Premier League
- Suzan-Lori Parks, playwright
- Isaiah Philmore, professional basketball player
- Immanuel Quickley, basketball player for the Toronto Raptors
- Mark F. Ramsay, former Lieutenant General of United States Air Force
- Zach Thornton, former goalie for Chicago Fire of Major League Soccer
- Drew Westervelt, professional lacrosse player
