= Qadir Ismail =

American football player (born 2000)

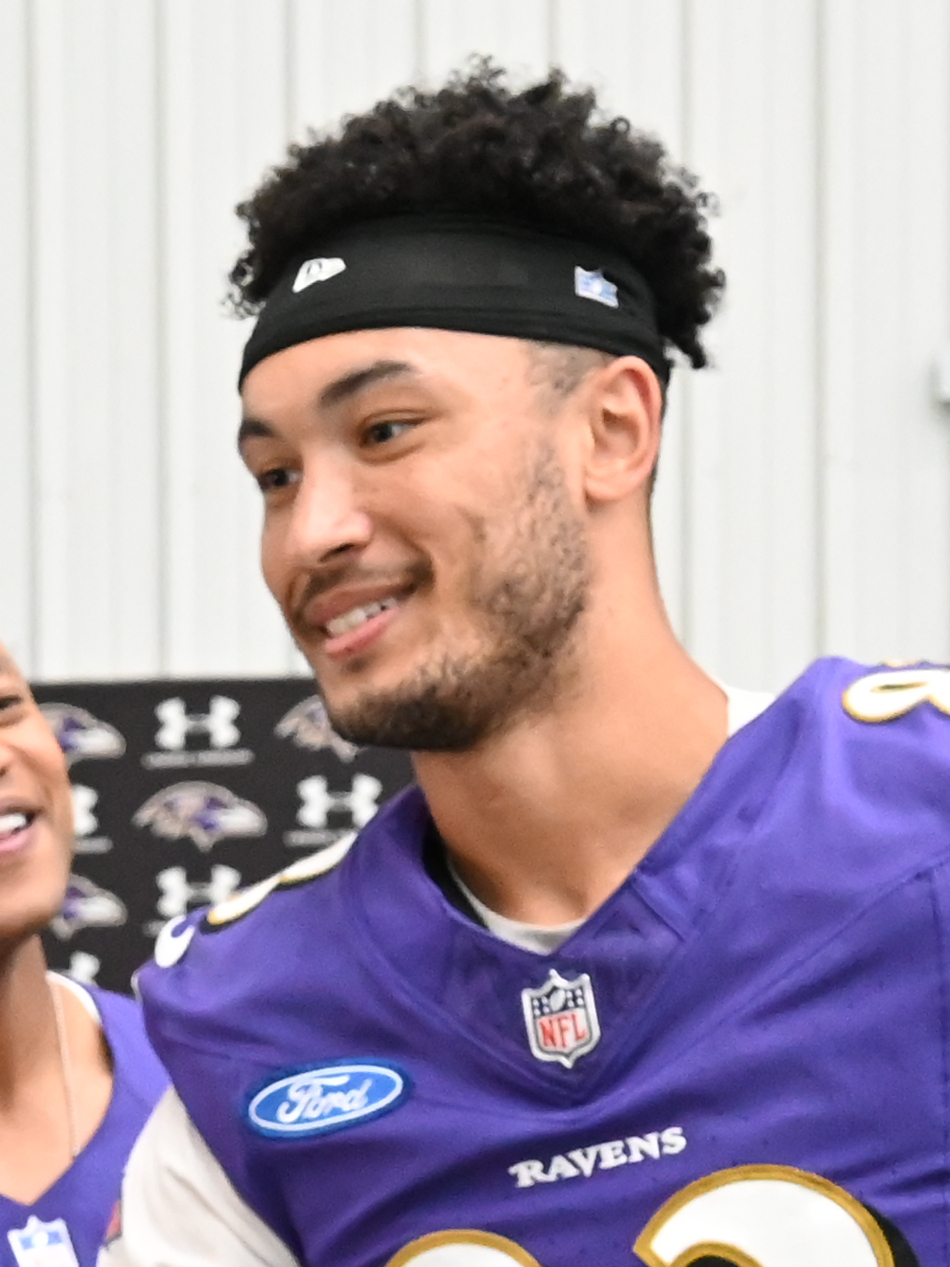
- Ismail in 2024

No. 80 – Chicago Bears
- Position: Tight end
- Roster status: Practice squad

Personal information
- Born: February 17, 2000 (age 26); Boca Raton, Florida, U.S.
- Listed height: 6 ft 6 in (1.98 m)
- Listed weight: 245 lb (111 kg)

Career information
- High school: John Carroll (Bel Air, Maryland)
- College: Villanova (2018–2021); Samford (2022–2023)
- NFL draft: 2024: undrafted

Career history
- Baltimore Ravens (2024)*; Las Vegas Raiders (2025)*; New York Giants (2025)*; Jacksonville Jaguars (2025)*; Chicago Bears (2025–present)*
- * Offseason or practice squad member only
- Stats at Pro Football Reference

Qadir Ismail (born February 17, 2000) is an American professional football tight end for the Chicago Bears of the National Football League (NFL). He played college football for the Samford Bulldogs and Villanova Wildcats.

== Early life ==
Ismail is the son of former NFL wide receiver Qadry Ismail and nephew of former football players Raghib Ismail and Sulaiman Ismail. He grew up in Bel Air, Maryland. In high school, Ismail played football, basketball, and ran track. He spent his freshman and sophomore year(s) at Patterson Mill High School before transferring to The John Carroll School.

== College career ==
Ismail originally played quarterback for Villanova before converting to wide receiver.

Prior to the 2022 season, Ismail transferred to Samford, where he completed his collegiate football career as a wide receiver.

== Professional career ==
Pre-draft measurables
Height	Weight	Arm length	Hand span	Wingspan	40-yard dash	10-yard split	20-yard split	20-yard shuttle	Three-cone drill	Vertical jump	Broad jump
6 ft 6 3/4 in (2.00 m)	232 lb (105 kg)	34 1/8 in (0.87 m)	9 1/8 in (0.23 m)	6 ft 9 1/2 in (2.07 m)	4.69 s	1.62 s	2.66 s	4.47 s	7.25 s	34.5 in (0.88 m)	10 ft 1 in (3.07 m)
All values from Pro Day

=== Baltimore Ravens ===
After not being selected in the 2024 NFL draft, Ismail signed with the Baltimore Ravens as an undrafted free agent on May 20, 2024. He was waived on August 27, and signed with the Ravens practice squad the next day.

=== Las Vegas Raiders ===
On April 24, 2025, Ismail signed with the Las Vegas Raiders. He was waived on August 25.

=== New York Giants ===
On August 28, 2025, Ismail was signed to the New York Giants' practice squad. He was released on September 16.

=== Jacksonville Jaguars ===
On October 8, 2025, Ismail signed with the Jacksonville Jaguars' practice squad, but was waived five days later.

=== Chicago Bears ===
On November 24, 2025, Ismail signed with the Chicago Bears' practice squad. On January 21, 2026, he signed a reserve/futures contract with Chicago.

On August 30, 2026, Ismail was waived by the Bears as a part of final roster cuts. On September 2, Chicago re–signed Ismail to their practice squad.
