= Thomas William McNamara =

United States Navy officer (1926–2020)

- Born: November 26, 1926; Miners' Mills, Pennsylvania, U.S.
- Died: January 28, 2020 (aged 93); San Diego, California, U.S.
- Burial place: Miramar National Cemetery
- Military career
- Allegiance: United States
- Branch: United States Navy
- Service years: 1948–1979
- Rank: Rear Admiral
- Commands: USS Robison; USS Chicago
- Conflicts: Korean War; Vietnam War: Operation Sea Dragon; Operation Pocket Money

Thomas William McNamara (November 26, 1926 – January 28, 2020) was a United States Navy officer who served in the Tonkin Gulf during the Vietnam War.

== Early life and education ==
McNamara was born November 26, 1926, in the Miners' Mills neighborhood of Wilkes-Barre, Pennsylvania. He was a son of William and Mary (Quigley) McNamara. After graduation from James M. Coughlin High School, he attended the United States Merchant Marine Academy as a midshipman from February 1945. He was commissioned in the United States Navy Reserve as an ensign upon graduation in June 1948.

== Naval career ==
Upon commissioning, McNamara reported for active duty as a division officer aboard the attack transport USS Henrico. Henrico operated in the vicinity of Qingdao until the city fell to the Chinese Communists in 1949 during the Chinese Civil War. Ensign McNamara was released from active duty in October 1949, and received a business degree from Lehigh University in 1951. He was recalled to active duty in 1952 as a lieutenant (junior grade) navigator aboard the attack transport USS Montrose supporting combat operations during the Korean War. After again being released from active duty in 1954, he received a regular navy commission as lieutenant in 1955.

McNamara was executive officer aboard the minesweeper USS Energy deploying to the western Pacific to conduct training with the Republic of China Navy and Republic of Korea Navy. In May 1958 he reported aboard the destroyer USS Floyd B. Parks as Operations Officer in the western Pacific. Following promotion to lieutenant commander in 1959, he graduated from the Naval War College in 1962, and was executive officer aboard the destroyer USS John Paul Jones until 1964 including recovery operations for the Mercury 8 space capsule with Wally Schirra and operating off the coast of Cuba during the Cuban Missile Crisis.

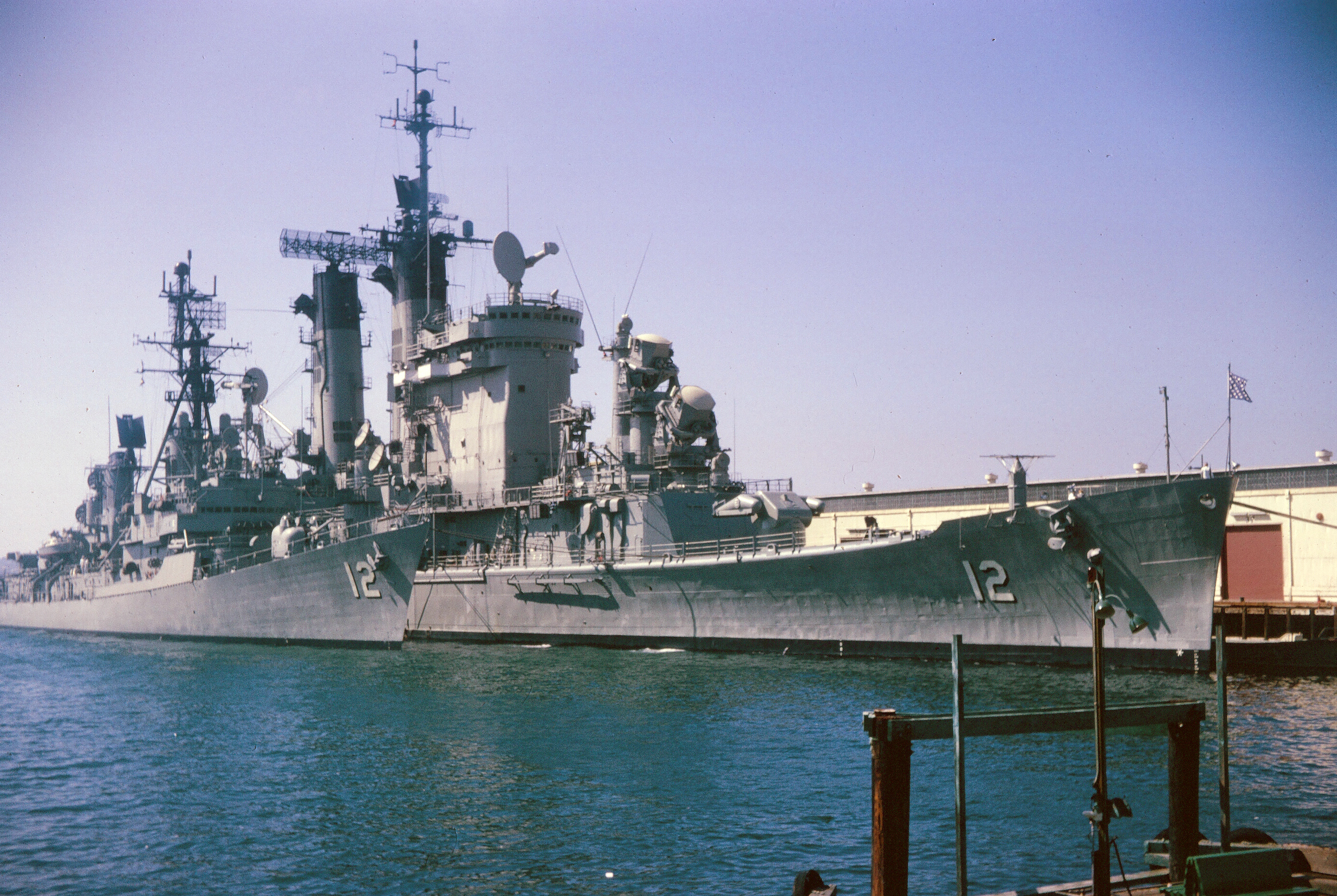
USS Robison on the left was McNamara's first combat command and is moored outboard of USS Columbus, a sister-ship of his second combat command USS Chicago.

McNamara was promoted to commander in 1963, and was commanding officer of the destroyer USS Robison from 1966 to 1968. Under his command, Robison deployed to Vietnam screening the aircraft carrier USS Coral Sea and providing naval gunfire support for Operation Sea Dragon. Robison came under fire from North Vietnamese shore batteries while destroying 78 North Vietnamese waterborne logistics craft. Robison was awarded the Meritorious Unit Commendation and McNamara received the Bronze Star Medal with "V" device.

Following promotion to captain in 1968, McNamara was commanding officer of the cruiser USS Chicago from 1971 to 1973. Under his command, Chicago completed its 5th PIRAZ deployment to the Gulf of Tonkin before being recalled in response to the North Vietnamese Easter Offensive into South Vietnam. Air intercept controllers aboard Chicago directed Navy and Air Force aircraft on 14 successful shoot-downs of North Vietnamese MiG fighters, including the second MiG downed by Navy aces Duke Cunningham and William P. Driscoll. On May 9, 1972, the cruiser's forward RIM-8 Talos missile launcher shot down a North Vietnamese MiG during Operation Pocket Money. Chicago came under fire from North Vietnamese shore batteries and received the Navy Unit Commendation.

McNamara was promoted to rear admiral in 1975, and served as the last commandant of the Ninth Naval District from 1977 until his retirement when the district was disestablished in the 1979 reorganization.

== Awards ==
McNamara's awards include:

- Legion of Merit
- Bronze Star Medal with "V" device
- Meritorious Service Medal
- Combat Action Ribbon
- Navy Unit Commendation
- Meritorious Unit Commendation
- American Campaign Medal
- European-African-Middle East Campaign Medal
- World War II Victory Medal
- Navy Expeditionary Medal
- China Service Medal
- National Defense Service Medal with bronze star
- Korean Service Medal
- United Nations Service Medal
- Armed Forces Expeditionary Medal
- Vietnam Service Medal with silver star and two bronze stars
- Republic of Vietnam Campaign Medal with device
- Korean Presidential Unit Citation
- Republic of Vietnam Gallantry Cross
