= Sulaiman Ismail =

American football wide receiver

Sulaiman "The Bomb" Ismail is an American former football player. He played collegiately as a walk-on at the University of Texas-El Paso in 1995. On February 14, 2001, he signed a three-year contract with the Arena Football League's New York Dragons, but was waived soon after. He was claimed by the Greensboro Prowlers of the af2 on April 4, but placed on the inactive list on April 26.

Sulaiman has a black belt in Shotokan Karate, judo and jujutsu. He has had three professional boxing matches with a record of 1–2–0 and five amateur MMA matches with a record of 2–3–0.

== Personal life ==
Sulaiman is the younger brother of former NFL wide receivers Raghib "Rocket" Ismail and Qadry "Missile" Ismail as well as the uncle of Qadry's son, receiver Qadir Ismail.
