= G. A. R. Memorial Junior/Senior High School =

G.A.R. Memorial Middle School
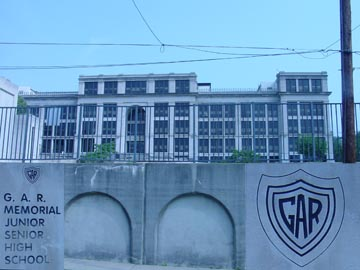

Location
- 250 South Grant Street; Wilkes-Barre, Pennsylvania 18702; United States; 41°14′02″N 75°52′59″W

Information
- Type: Middle School
- Motto: Be Safe Be Respectful Be Responsible
- Established: 1925 as a High School, 2021 as a Middle School
- School district: Wilkes-Barre Area School District
- Principal: Jeffrey Craig
- Staff: 53.36 (FTE)
- Grades: 6-8
- Enrollment: 1,066 (2023-2024)
- Student to teacher ratio: 19.98
- Colors: Blue and Gray
- Mascot: Grenadiers
- Website: School website

G.A.R. Memorial Middle School (commonly known throughout the area simply as 'G.A.R.', and previously known as G.A.R. Memorial Junior-Senior High School), is a middle school located on 250 South Grant Street, in Wilkes-Barre, located in Luzerne County, Pennsylvania, United States.

G.A.R. was both a junior and senior public high school, offering education to students in grades 7–12. It was named for the Grand Army of the Republic. In 2021, it was consolidated with other high schools in the area to form Wilkes-Barre Area High School. The school continues to operate, now as a middle school for grades 6th-8th.

== History ==
The school was built in 1925 after construction started in 1921, four years earlier. In 1978, the school district decided to make extensions to the school; this construction was completed in October 1979. The extension included a new cafeteria, gym, chorus room, and band room. The original shop building was demolished and turned into the faculty parking, the Girls Gym was changed into the Library and Girls Gym changing room was remodeled into the Home Ec rooms, the Boys Gym was remodeled into the Tech Ed room, the Boys Gym changing room was changed into the Woodshop room, and the chorus and band rooms were bricked off.

In 2005, a weight room was added. In 2013, the school installed a new turf field in front of the building, replacing the old turf which was worn and damaged after years of use.

The school was consolidated into Wilkes-Barre Area High School prior to the 2021–2022 school year. It is now used as a middle school.

== Notable alumni ==
- David Bohm - Quantum physicist who was involved in the Manhattan Project.
- Mark James Klepaski- Bass player for the rock band Breaking Benjamin.
- Greg Skrepenak- Former NFL player and former Luzerne County Commissioner.
- Sam Savitt - Author and illustrator, official artist of the U.S. Equestrian Team.
- Bob Sura- NBA player who last played for the Houston Rockets
- Robert Williams - Quarterback for Notre Dame, 1956–1958
- Maurice Peoples - Olympic sprinter, 1972
- Mark Glowinski - NFL player for the New York Giants.
- Lillian Cahn - Co-founder of Coach Leather

• Popp Hunna, rapper
