= Wilkes-Barre Area School District =

School district in Pennsylvania

Wilkes–Barre Area School District
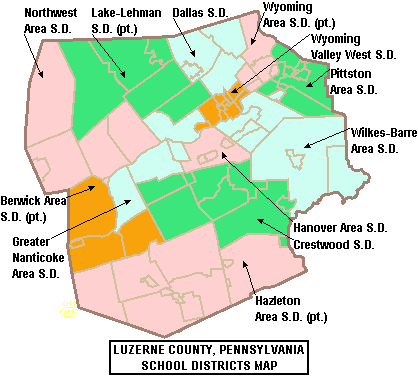
- Location of Wilkes–Barre Area School District in Luzerne County, Pennsylvania

Location
- 730 South Main St. Wilkes-Barre, Pennsylvania 18702 United States
- Coordinates: 41.239°N 75.909°W

District information
- Type: Public
- Superintendent: Brian Costello
- NCES District ID: 4226300

Students and staff
- Students: 7,089 (2020-21)
- Faculty: 434.17 (on an FTE basis)
- Student–teacher ratio: 16.33
- Athletic conference: PIAA District 2

Other information
- Website: www.wbasd.k12.pa.us

Wilkes–Barre Area School District is an urban public school district located in Luzerne County, Pennsylvania, United States. The district encompasses approximately 123 square miles. The district includes the city of Wilkes-Barre as well as smaller surrounding municipalities. It serves: Bear Creek Township, Borough of Bear Creek Village, Borough of Laflin, Buck Township, City of Wilkes-Barre, Laurel Run Borough, Plains Township and Wilkes-Barre Township. According to 2000 federal census data, the district serves a resident population of 62,749. In 2009, the residents' per capita income was $16,751, while the median family income was $40,336.

As of 2020–2021, total student enrollment in the district was 7.089, according to National Center for Education Statistics data.

The district operates five elementary schools, two middle schools, and one high school, Wilkes-Barre Area High School.

== Schools ==
- Dr. David Kistler Elementary School
- Boyd Dodson Elementary School
- Daniel J. Flood Elementary School
- Heights-Murray Elementary School
- Solomon Elementary School
- G.A.R. Memorial Middle School
- Solomon Plains Middle School
- Wilkes-Barre Area STEM Academy
- Wilkes-Barre Area High School

In 2021, Elmer L. Meyers Junior/Senior High School, G. A. R. Memorial Junior/Senior High School, and James M. Coughlin High School were consolidated into Wilkes-Barre Area High School.

== Extracurriculars ==
The school district offers a wide variety of activities, clubs and sports.
