= Plains Township, Pennsylvania =

Township in Pennsylvania, US

Coordinates: 41°16′00″N 75°44′29″W

- Township
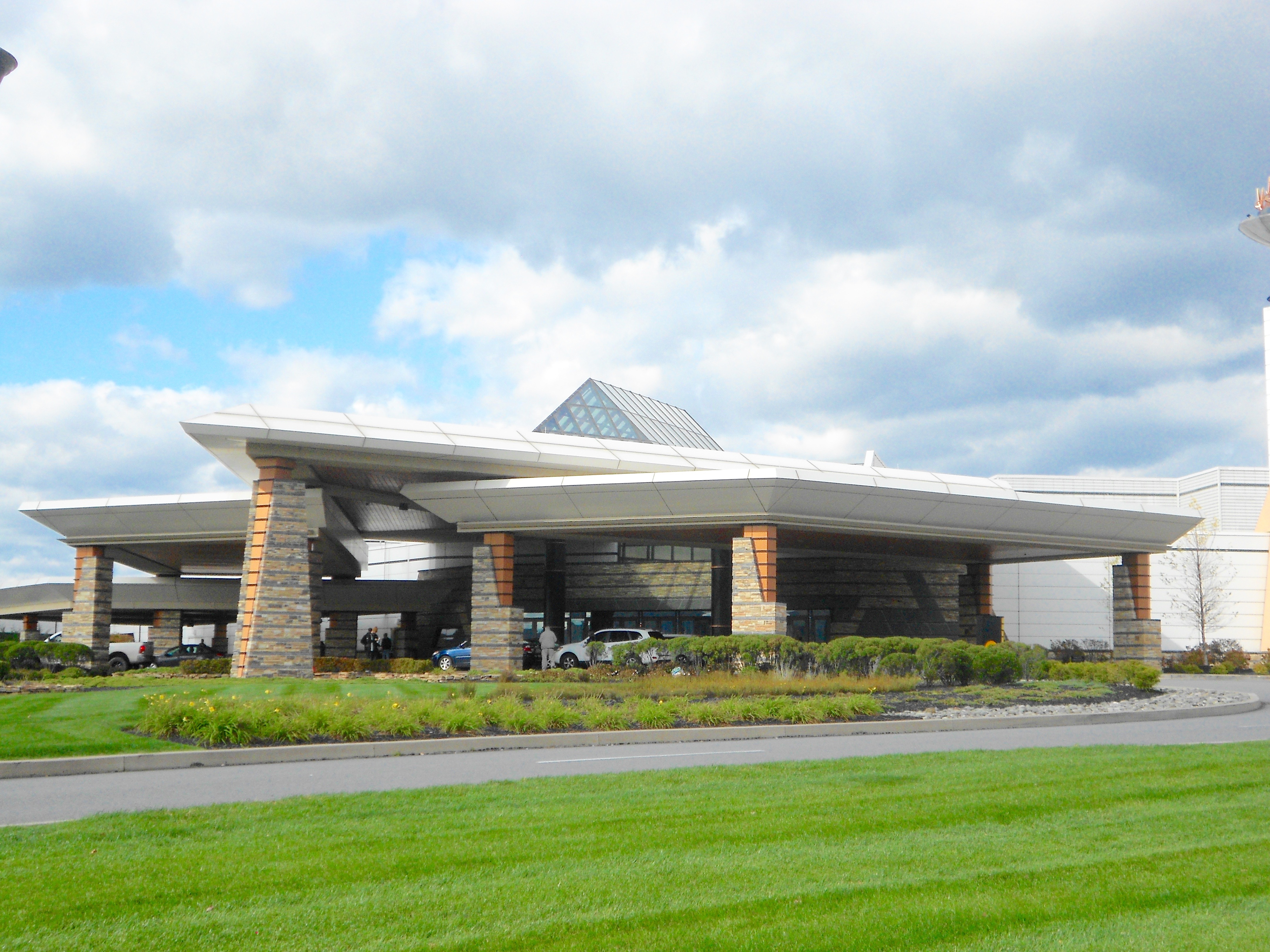
- Mohegan Pennsylvania in Plains Township

- Seal
- Nickname: Plains
- Motto: The Keystone of the Wyoming Valley
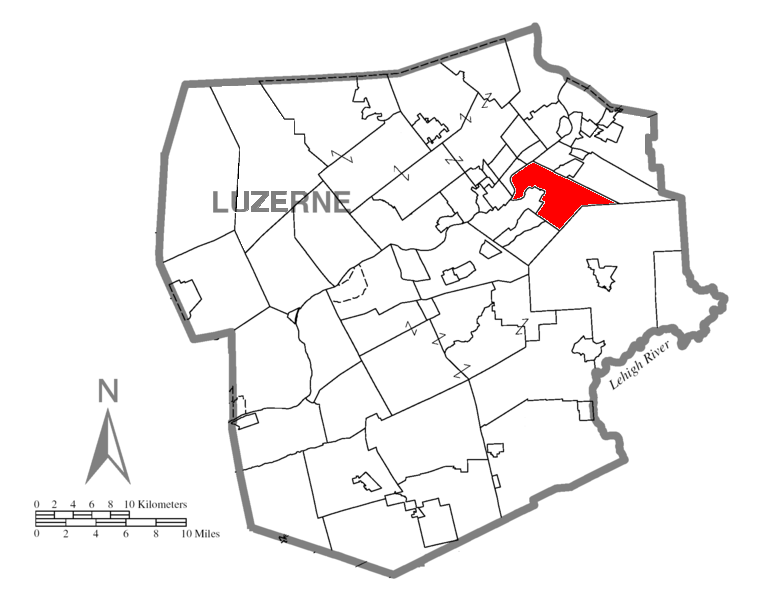
- Map of Luzerne County highlighting Plains Township

- Map of Pennsylvania highlighting Luzerne County
- Country: United States
- State: Pennsylvania
- County: Luzerne
- Settled: 1762
- Incorporated: 1851

Area
  - Total: 13.16 sq mi (34.09 km^{2})
  - Land: 12.91 sq mi (33.43 km^{2})
  - Water: 0.25 sq mi (0.66 km^{2})

Population (2020)
  - Total: 9,861 ▼
  - Estimate (2021): 9,807
  - Density: 753.6/sq mi (290.98/km^{2})
- Time zone: UTC-5 (Eastern (EST))
  - Summer (DST): UTC-4 (EDT)
- FIPS code: 42-079-61120
- Website: www.plainstownship.org

Plains Township is a township in Luzerne County, Pennsylvania, United States (on the outskirts of Wilkes-Barre). The population was 9,816 at the 2020 census. The municipality is the birthplace of Chicago White Sox hall of famer Ed Walsh and John J. Yeosock, a United States Army general who commanded the 3rd U.S. Army during Operation Desert Shield and Operation Desert Storm. Mohegan Pennsylvania is a casino in Plains Township (located along PA 315).

== History ==
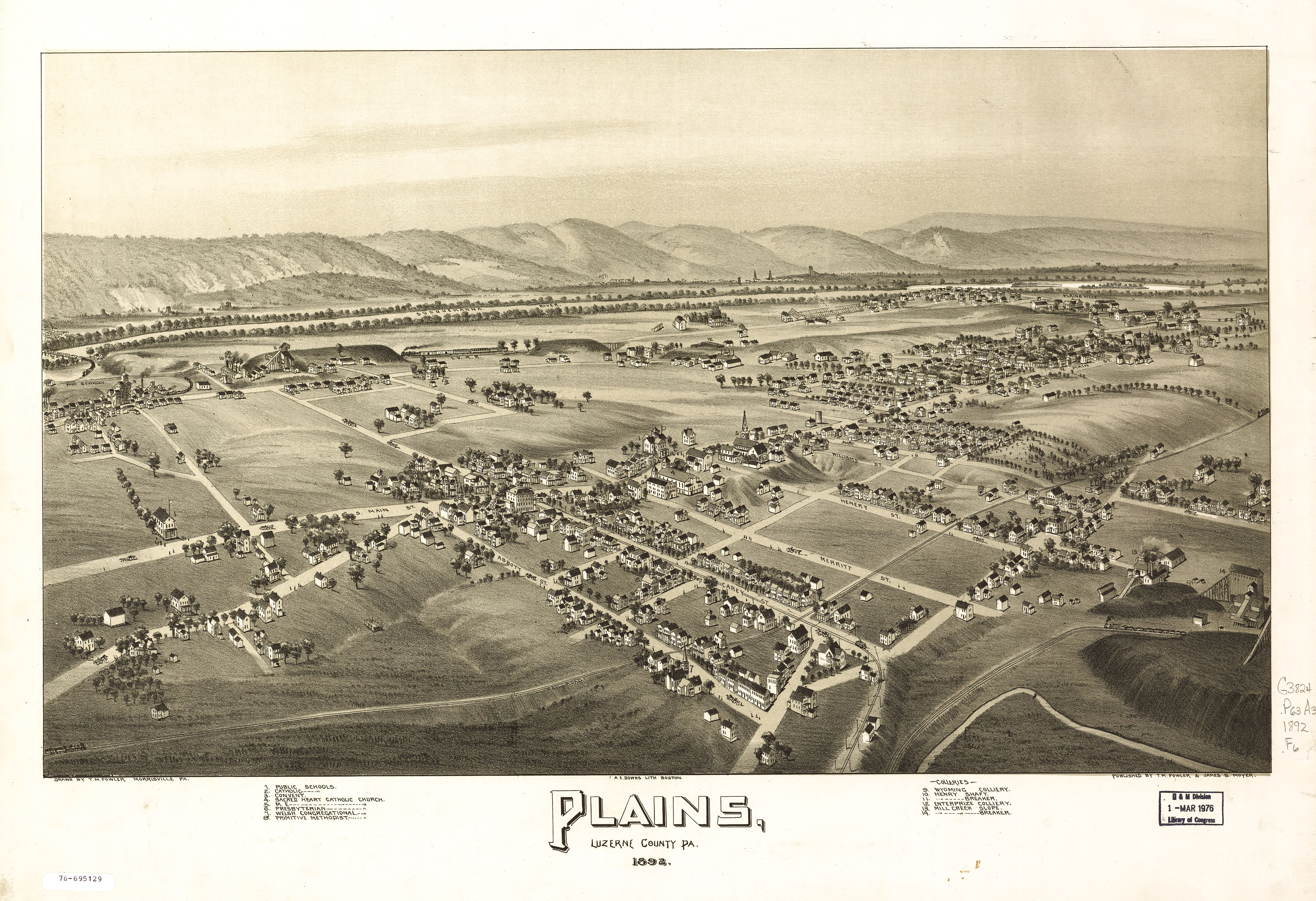
1892 bird's-eye view of Plains, Luzerne County

=== Settlement ===
Modern-day Plains Township was originally owned and occupied by the Wanami tribe of the Delaware Native Americans. Jacob was the tribe’s leader; he lived on level ground adjacent to the Susquehanna River (near the modern-day City of Wilkes-Barre). Early white settlers named the locality “Jacob’s Plains.” As time progressed, the settlers simply referred to it as “Plains.”

Roughly two hundred settlers from the Susquehanna Company of Connecticut arrived in Plains in August 1762; they established a small village of cabins just above the mouth of Mill Creek. They returned to New England in November after planting a few acres of wheat. The Susquehanna Company returned with their families, livestock, and provisions in the spring of 1763.

=== Massacre of 1763 ===
During the summer of 1763, the Iroquois and Delaware came together in an attempt to form a relationship. This resulted in a deadly fire which claimed the life of the Delaware chieftain (Teedyuscung). The Iroquois charged the colonists with the crime, and the aggrieved Delaware were determined to resolve the matter. On October 15, 1763, the unsuspecting pioneers were attacked by the Delaware. Twenty or thirty were killed, several were taken prisoner, and those who were not captured fled to the mountains; they had no other choice but to return to New England. The Native Americans finally burned what was left of the English settlement.

=== Pennamite-Yankee Wars ===
In January 1769, a group of Pennamites (who represented Pennsylvania) took possession of the land once occupied by the Susquehanna Land Company of Connecticut. They were known as the Ogden party; they established a fort in the region. The Connecticut settlers, who learned of the Pennamite occupation of the area, returned in the spring of 1769. This resulted in the Pennamite-Yankee Wars — a struggle between the Pennamites and the Yankees (from Connecticut). After a series of minor skirmishes, the conflict ended with the land being granted to Pennsylvania.

=== Township status ===
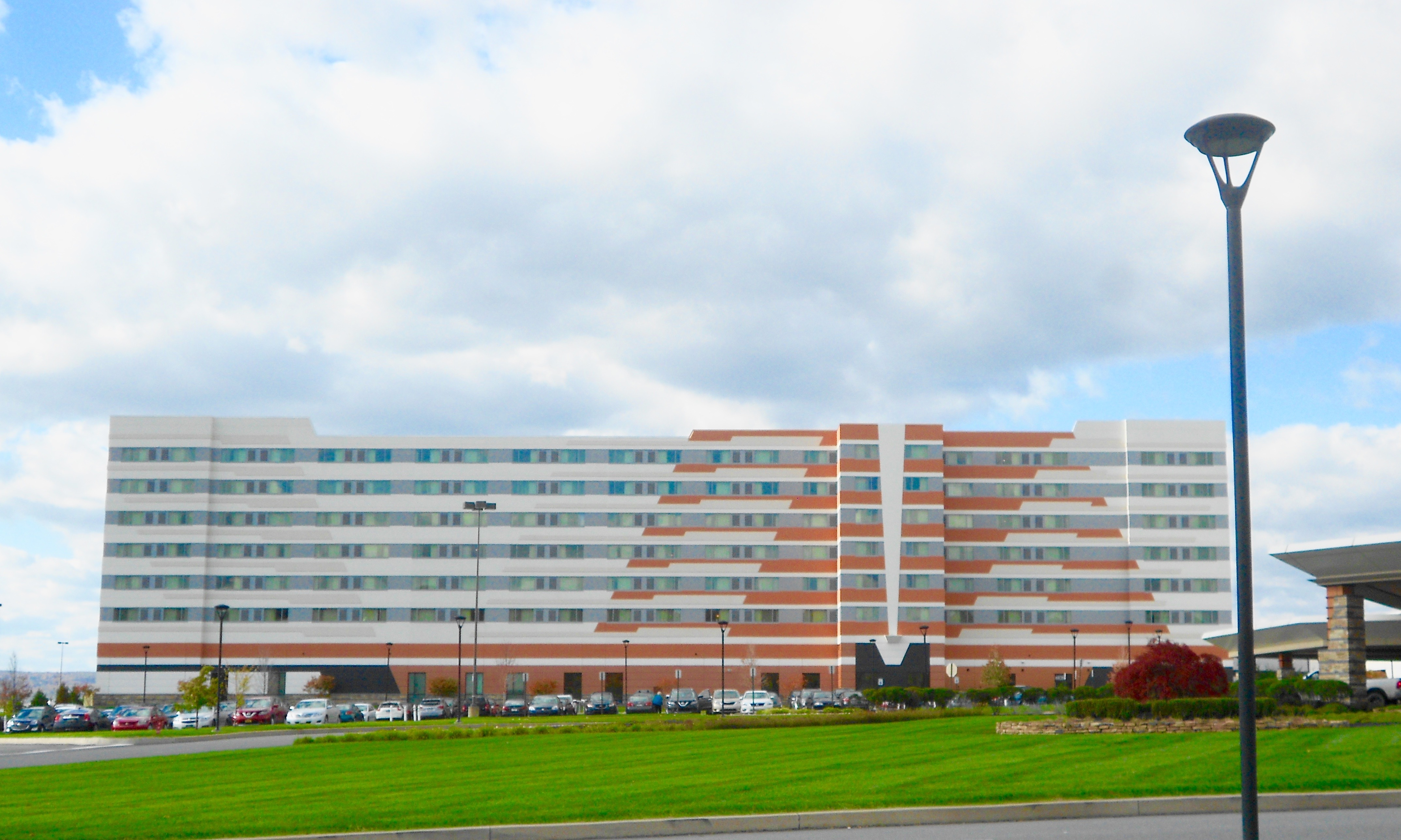
The casino’s hotel

Large amounts of anthracite coal rested underneath Plains. In 1808, Henry Stark of Plains succeeded in burning anthracite coal in a grate. This was the second successful attempt in the region (after Judge Jesse Fell). This resulted in the widespread use of anthracite coal as a fuel source. Throughout the 1800s, canals and railroads were constructed to aid in the mining and transportation of coal. The mining industry in Luzerne County boomed. Farming was a major way of life in Plains prior to the mining industry. Farmland was replaced by great collieries, breakers, canals, and railroads.

As a result of the growing population in Plains, it was officially made a township on November 10, 1851. Plains Township was formed from sections of Wilkes-Barre Township and Pittston Township.

At the beginning of the 20th century, Luzerne County was in the midst of an economic boom. Industry, which included manufacturing and coal mining, drew thousands of immigrants (mostly from Europe) to the region. By the mid-20th century, anthracite production was declining at a fairly steady rate. Consumers were gradually switching from coal to other forms of energy (e.g., oil, gas, and electricity). The Knox Mine Disaster was the final blow to the industry. On January 22, 1959, the Susquehanna River broke through the River Slope Mine in Port Griffith, Jenkins Township (just north of Plains Township). The incident claimed twelve lives. In the following months, two of the area's largest coal companies announced a full withdrawal from the anthracite business. Thousands of jobs were lost and the mining industry never recovered in Luzerne County.

In the early 21st century, Mohegan Pennsylvania (along PA 315) became one of Pennsylvania's first casinos. The casino features over 2,300 slots, and live tables for blackjack, roulette, and poker. The casino opened in November 2006. In November 2013, Mohegan Sun opened a hotel (which is connected to the casino floor).

== Geography ==
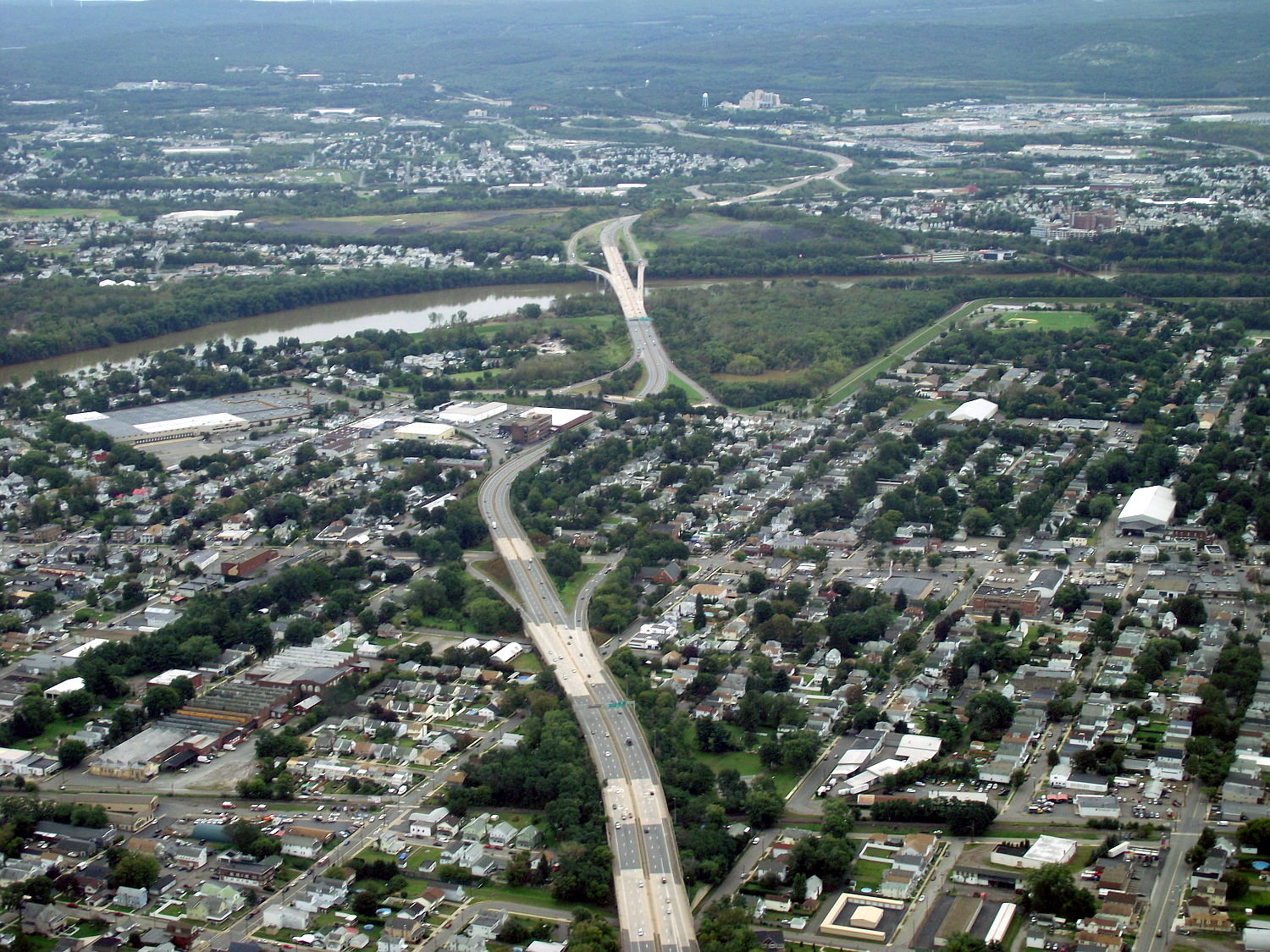
PA 309 as it crosses over the Susquehanna River and into Plains Township (in the background)

According to the United States Census Bureau, the township has a total area of 13.2 square miles (34.1 km^{2}), of which 12.9 square miles (33.4 km^{2}) is land and 0.27 square miles (0.7 km^{2}), or 1.95%, is water. It extends from the Susquehanna River in the northwest to the north slope of Wyoming Mountain in the southeast.

Its villages include Hilldale, Hudson, Llewellyn Corners (also in Bear Creek Township), Midvale, Plains, Plainsville, Port Bowkley, and Westminster.

Plains Township's numbered routes include I-81, PA 115, PA 309, and PA 315. I-476 crosses the eastern portion of Plains Township. Main Street and River Street cross the populous northwestern portion of the township between Wilkes-Barre and Jenkins Township. The southern and eastern sections of the municipality are scarcely populated. This region of the township is mostly made up of forested mountains.

=== Tourist attractions ===
- There are hotels, stores, restaurants and the Mohegan Pennsylvania racetrack and casino along PA 315.
- Seven Tubs Recreation Area is located off PA 115 (in southern Plains Township).

=== Neighboring municipalities ===
- Wilkes-Barre (southwest)
- Kingston (west)
- Forty Fort (west)
- Wyoming (north)
- Jenkins Township (north and northeast)
- Laflin (northeast)
- Bear Creek Township (southeast)
- Laurel Run (south)
- Wilkes-Barre Township (south)
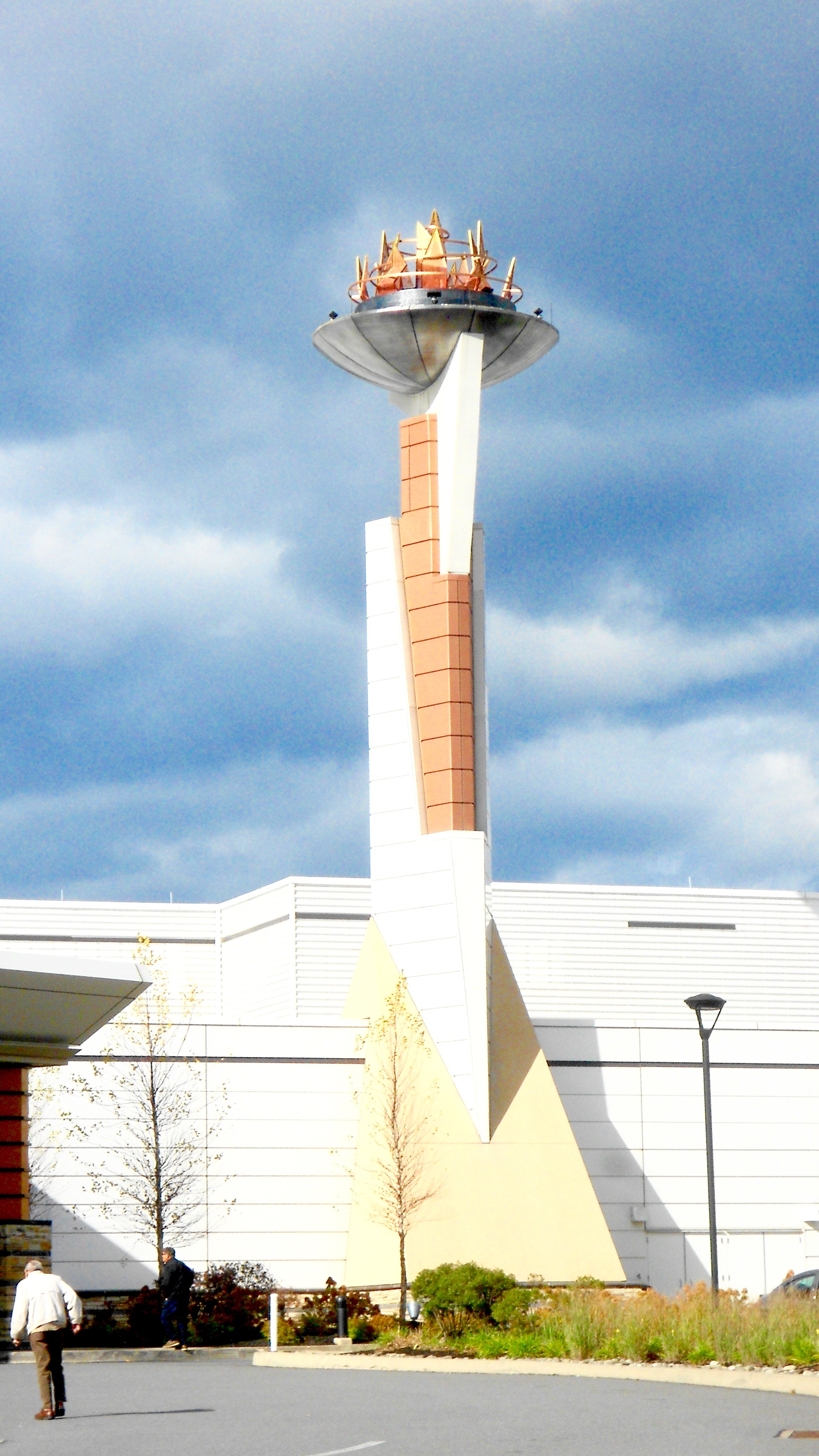
Torch near the entrance of the casino

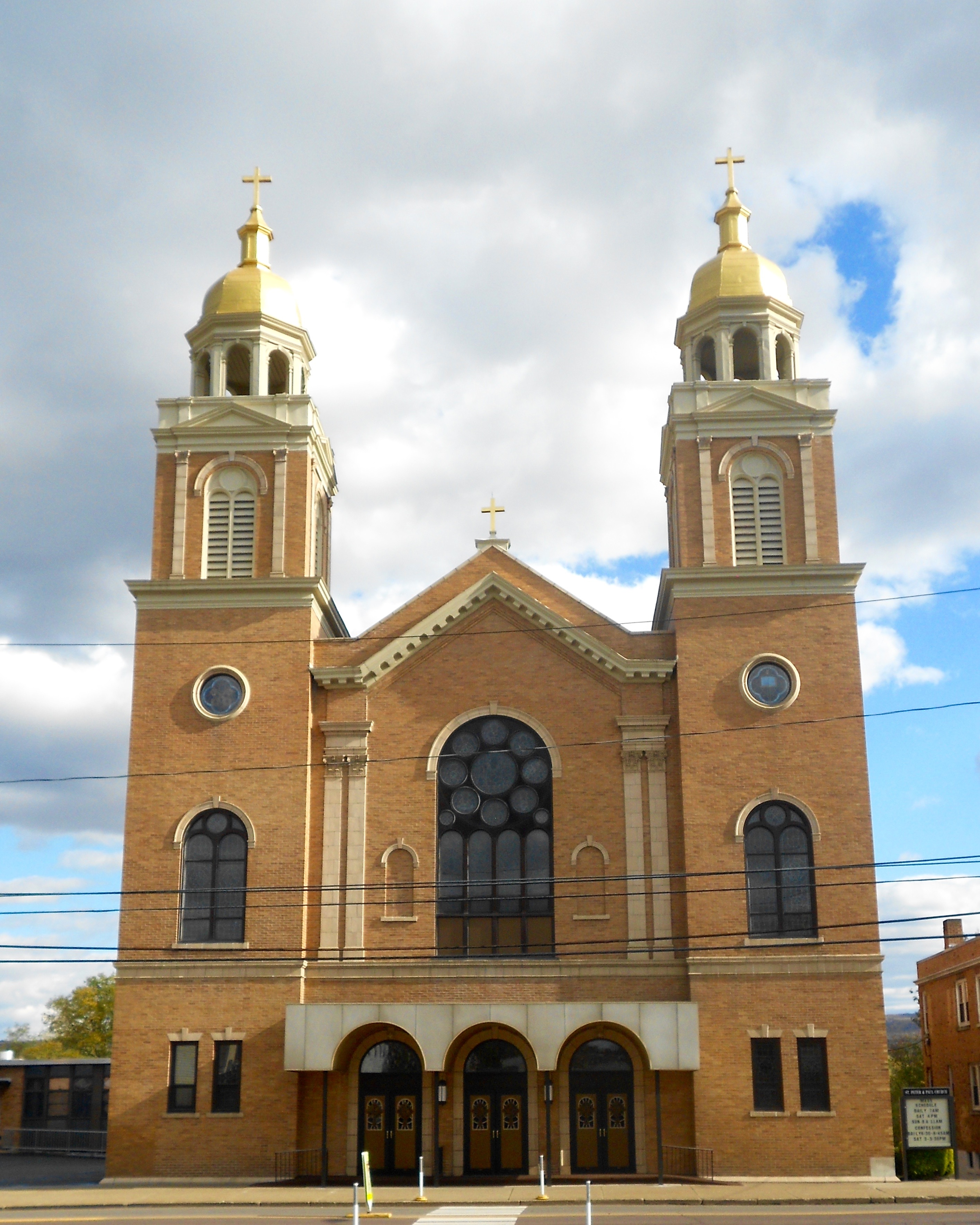
SS Peter and Paul Catholic Church

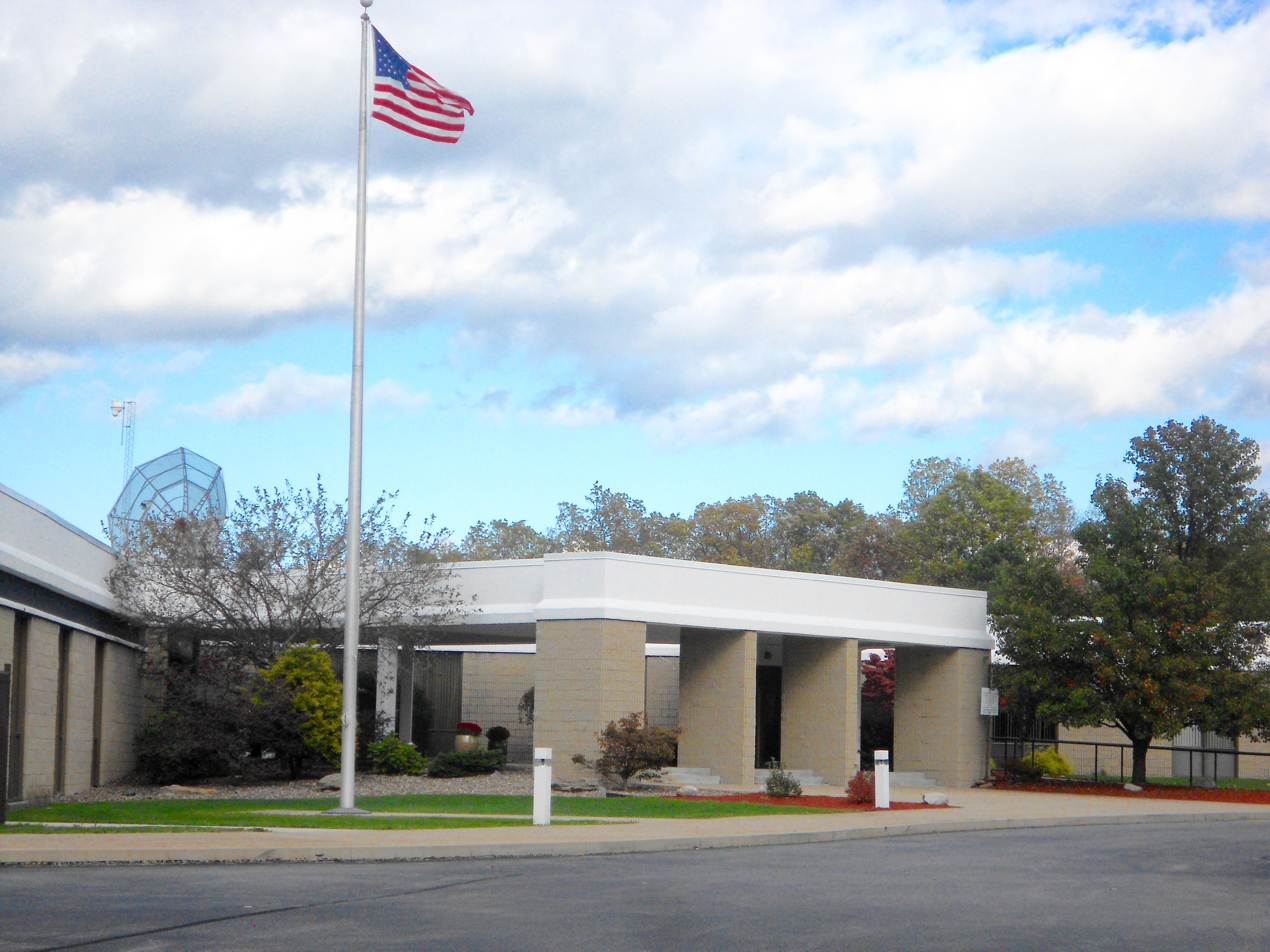
Wilkes-Barre Area CTC

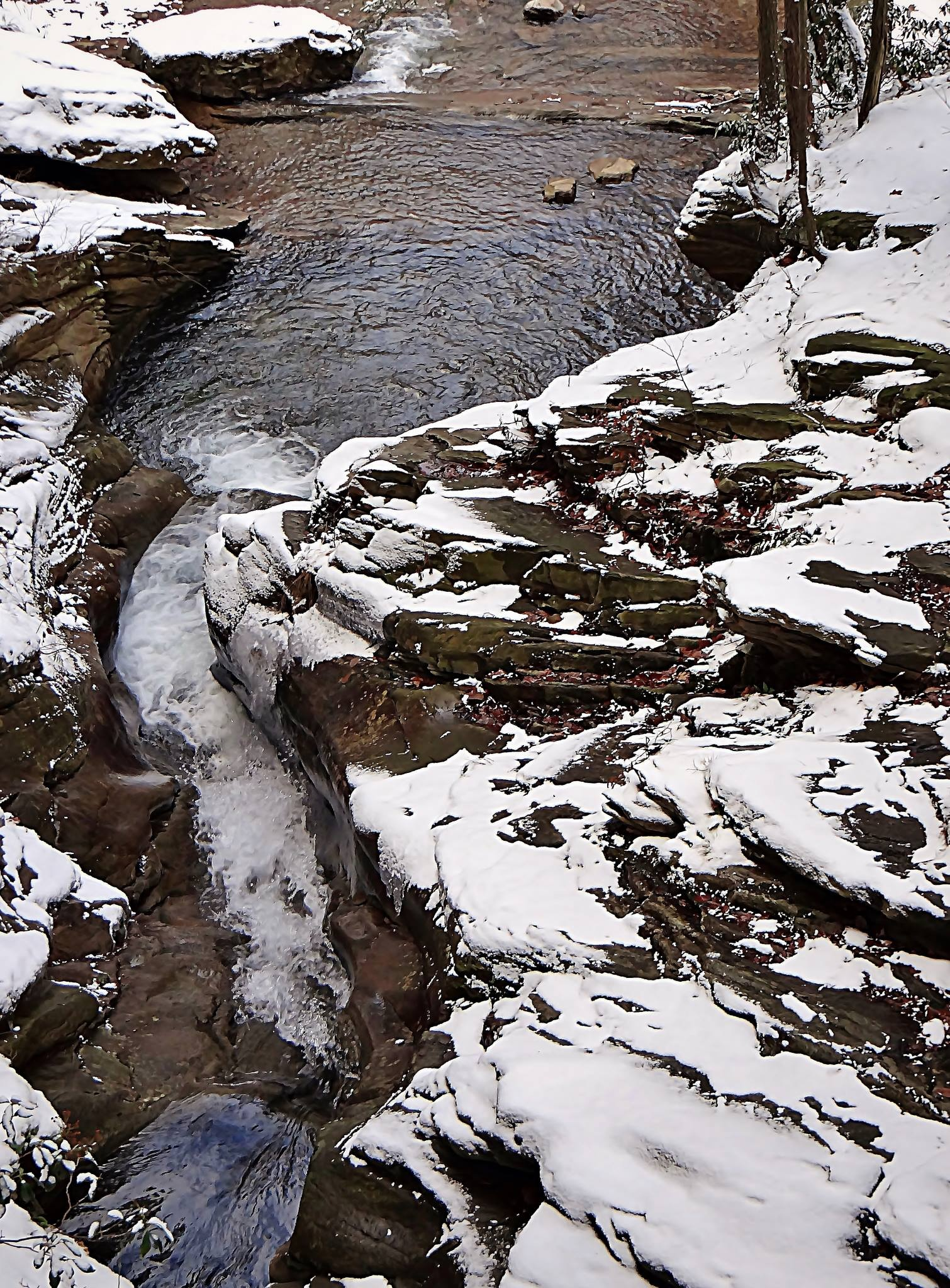
Seven Tubs Recreation Area

=== Climate ===
The township has a humid continental climate (Dfa/Dfb) and average monthly temperatures in the village of Plains range from 26.6 °F in January to 72.4 °F in July. PRISM Climate Group at Oregon State University

== Demographics ==
Historical population
Census	Pop.	Note	%±
2000	10,906		—
2010	9,961		−8.7%
2020	9,816		−1.5%
2021 (est.)	9,807		−0.1%
U.S. Decennial Census

As of the census of 2000, there were 10,906 people, 4,556 households, and 2,870 families residing in the township. The population density was 822.1 inhabitants per square mile (317.4/km^{2}). There were 5,007 housing units at an average density of 377.4 per square mile (145.7/km^{2}). The racial makeup of the township was 98.33% White, 0.48% African American, 0.03% Native American, 0.80% Asian, 0.09% from other races, and 0.28% from two or more races. Hispanic or Latino of any race were 0.51% of the population.

There were 4,556 households, out of which 23.5% had children under the age of 18 living with them, 48.4% were married couples living together, 10.5% had a female householder with no husband present, and 37.0% were non-families. 33.1% of all households were made up of individuals, and 16.1% had someone living alone who was 65 years of age or older. The average household size was 2.26 and the average family size was 2.89.

In the township the population was spread out, with 17.6% under the age of 18, 6.4% from 18 to 24, 26.0% from 25 to 44, 25.6% from 45 to 64, and 24.4% who were 65 years of age or older. The median age was 45 years. For every 100 females, there were 93.8 males. For every 100 females age 18 and over, there were 90.1 males.

The median income for a household in the township was $36,603, and the median income for a family was $46,549. Males had a median income of $34,076 versus $25,880 for females. The per capita income for the township was $19,712. About 6.9% of families and 8.3% of the population were below the poverty line, including 11.1% of those under age 18 and 9.5% of those age 65 or over.

== Government ==
The Plains Township Board of Commissioners is the municipality's governing body.

- Thomas Shubilla – Chairman
- Peter J. Biscontini, Esq. – Vice Chairman
- Ciro Cinti
- Robert Sax
- Dennis Condusta
- Attorney Stephen Menn – Solicitor
- Lynell Ent – Township Secretary
- Sharon Stark – Assistant Secretary

== Notable people ==
- Ed Walsh, Chicago White Sox hall of famer
- John J. Yeosock, a United States Army general
