= Plains, Pennsylvania =

Unincorporated community in Pennsylvania, US

- Census-designated place
- Location in Pennsylvania Location in the United States
- Coordinates: 41°16′24″N 75°51′14″W
- Country: United States
- State: Pennsylvania
- County: Luzerne
- Township: Plains

Area
  - Total: 1.28 sq mi (3.31 km^{2})
  - Land: 1.28 sq mi (3.31 km^{2})
  - Water: 0 sq mi (0.00 km^{2})

Population (2020)
  - Total: 4,293
  - Density: 3,362.4/sq mi (1,298.22/km^{2})
- Time zone: UTC-5 (Eastern (EST))
  - Summer (DST): UTC-4 (EDT)
- Area code: 570
- FIPS code: 42-61112

Plains is a census-designated place (CDP) in Plains Township, Pennsylvania, United States. The population of the CDP was 4,335 at the 2010 census, out of 9,961 in the entire township.

== Geography ==
Plains CDP is located in the western portion of Plains Township at 41°16′24″N 75°51′14″W. It is bordered by the city of Wilkes-Barre to the south and the Susquehanna River to the west. The CDP of Hilldale is to the north, and Hudson is to the east.

According to the United States Census Bureau, the CDP has a total area of 1.3 square miles (3.3 km^{2}), all land. It is served by Exit 3 on the North Cross Valley Expressway (Pennsylvania Route 309).

== Demographics ==
Historical population
Census	Pop.	Note	%±
2020	4,293		—
U.S. Decennial Census

=== 2020 census ===
As of the 2020 census, Plains had a population of 4,293. The median age was 45.6 years. 15.5% of residents were under the age of 18 and 23.9% were 65 years of age or older. For every 100 females there were 95.6 males, and for every 100 females age 18 and over there were 93.0 males age 18 and over.

100.0% of residents lived in urban areas, while 0.0% lived in rural areas.

There were 2,019 households, of which 17.5% had children under the age of 18 living in them. Of all households, 35.7% were married-couple households, 21.0% were households with a male householder and no spouse or partner present, and 34.5% were households with a female householder and no spouse or partner present. About 38.6% of all households were made up of individuals, and 19.4% had someone living alone who was 65 years of age or older.

There were 2,221 housing units, of which 9.1% were vacant. The homeowner vacancy rate was 2.2% and the rental vacancy rate was 7.5%.

Racial composition as of the 2020 census
Race	Number	Percent
White	3,767	87.7%
Black or African American	168	3.9%
American Indian and Alaska Native	9	0.2%
Asian	55	1.3%
Native Hawaiian and Other Pacific Islander	0	0.0%
Some other race	70	1.6%
Two or more races	224	5.2%
Hispanic or Latino (of any race)	223	5.2%

== Education ==
It is in the Wilkes-Barre Area School District.

== Notable people ==
- Bruce Kozerski, former American football center in the National Football League for the Cincinnati Bengals
- Hank Kozlowski, sportswriter
- Max Rosenn, judge
- Ed Walsh, Hall of Fame baseball player from the Chicago White Sox
- Lieutenant General John J. Yeosock, Commanding Army General during Operation Desert Storm.
