= Rockland High School =

Rockland High School may refer to a school in the United States:

- Rockland High School (1909) - a former high school in Rockland, Massachusetts
- Rockland Senior High School - a current high school in Rockland, Massachusetts
