= WRPS =

Radio station at Rockland High School

- Rockland, Massachusetts; United States
- Frequency: 88.3 MHz

Programming
- Format: High School

Ownership
- Owner: Rockland Public Schools

History
- First air date: February 1974
- Call sign meaning: Rockland Public Schools

Technical information
- Licensing authority: FCC
- Facility ID: 57299
- Class: A
- ERP: 105 watts, Stereo
- HAAT: 42 meters (138 ft)
- Transmitter coordinates: 42°07′43″N 70°55′01″W

Links
- Public license information: Public file; LMS
- Webcast: Listen live
- Website: WRPS Radio 88.3FM

WRPS (88.3 FM) is a high school radio station licensed to serve Rockland, Massachusetts. The station is owned by Rockland Public Schools and operated by the staff and students of Rockland High School. It airs a combination high school/Hot AC music format in Stereo.

The station was assigned the WRPS call letters by the Federal Communications Commission (FCC), and began operations in February 1974.

== Alumni ==
In 1980, Boston broadcaster Fred B. Cole hosted a show every weekday afternoon playing big band records from his personal collection. Also in 1980, Dave Stewart of WCBS-FM (101.1), New York City began his career at WRPS while attending Junior High School in Rockland. He had been the late-night host at WPLJ (95.5) since 1989 until 2011. He is now the overnight host on 'CBS-FM (101.1) in New York.

In 1981 7th grader Kevin Keleher, mentored by Cole, began his tenure at WRPS. Kevin worked closely with Dave Stewart, Cole, and station manager Steve Budd to form a broadcast team. While Stewart went on to Emerson and the "bright lights of Broadway", Kevin left WRPS is 1984 and went on to perform in Boston rock bands in the 1990s. He hosted a Sunday morning Blues radio program "Blues Hangover", in 2003, on WBOR 91.1 FM in Brunswick, Maine.

In 1991 Jamin with Bill and Sean premiered as the #1 show on the air.

In 2003, James "Couzy" Anderson, a future TV broadcaster currently serving in the United States Air Force began announcing Play-by-play for the Rockland High School football team, which began a tenure of over 1,000 hours of announcing, 200 plus games and hosted a sports talk show weekly until graduation in 2007 .There was a famous show called Jamin with Bill & Shawn that aired in the early 1990s. Eventually Shawn graduated in 1991 and it became Jamin with Bill without Shawn.
