= Norwell, Massachusetts =

- Town
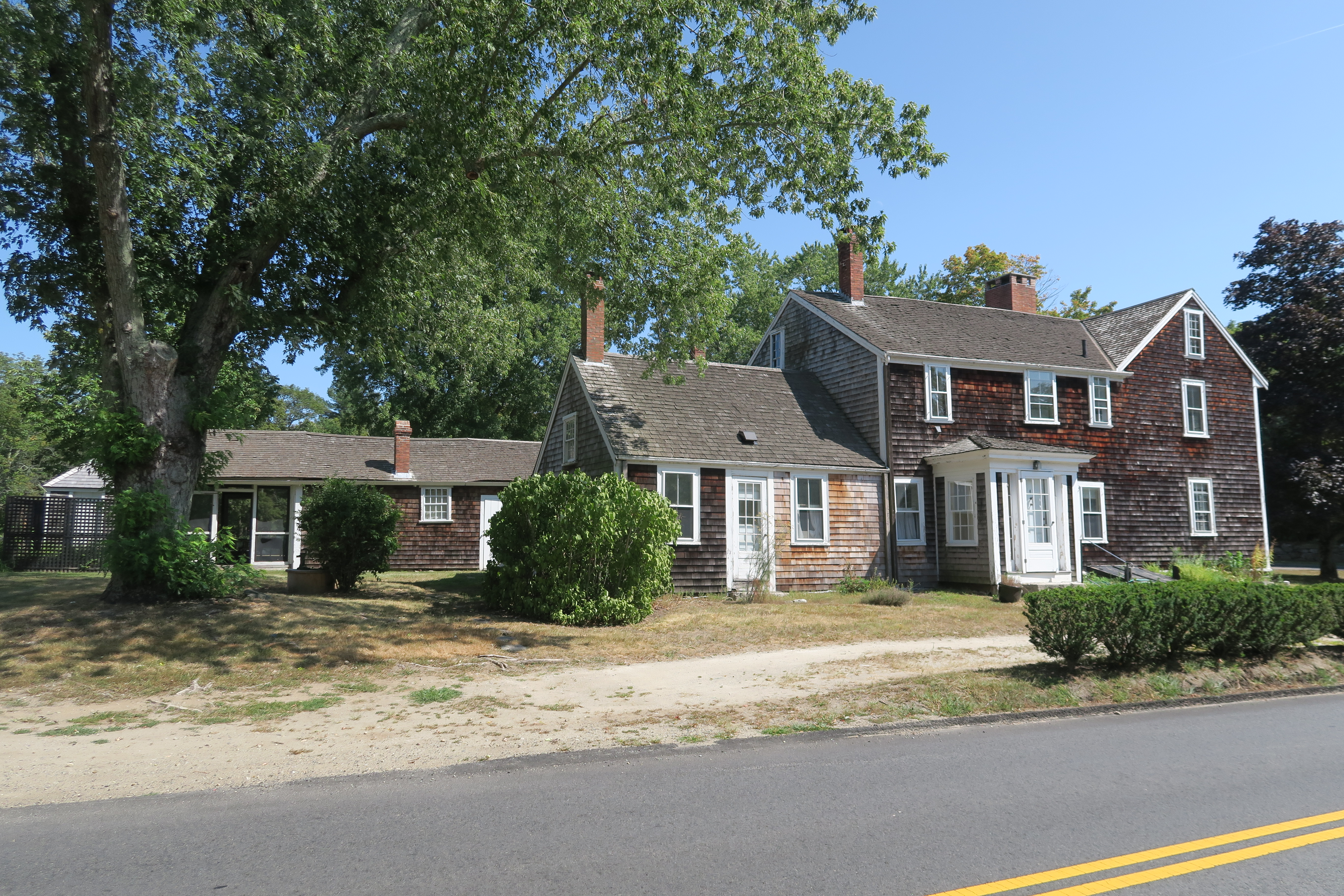
- Jacobs Farmhouse, Norwell Historical Society

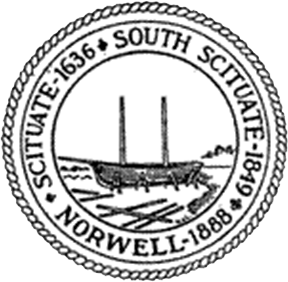
- Seal

- Location in Plymouth County, Massachusetts
- Coordinates: 42°09′42″N 70°47′40″W
- Country: United States
- State: Massachusetts
- County: Plymouth
- Settled: 1634
- Incorporated: February 14, 1849

Government
  - Type: Open town meeting
  - Town Administrator: Darleen Sullivan
  - Board of Selectmen: Ellen Allen, Chair; Jason Brown, Vice Chair; Alison Demong, Clerk; Joseph Rull; Bruce Graham

Area
  - Total: 21.2 sq mi (54.8 km^{2})
  - Land: 20.9 sq mi (54.1 km^{2})
  - Water: 0.31 sq mi (0.8 km^{2})
- Elevation: 82 ft (25 m)

Population (2020)
  - Total: 11,351
  - Density: 543/sq mi (210/km^{2})
- Time zone: UTC-5 (Eastern)
  - Summer (DST): UTC-4 (Eastern)
- ZIP Code: 02061
- Area code: 339/781
- FIPS code: 25-50145
- GNIS feature ID: 0618347
- Website: www.townofnorwell.net

Norwell is a town in Plymouth County, Massachusetts, United States. The population was 11,351 at the 2020 United States census. The town's southeastern border runs along the North River.

== History ==
Norwell was first settled in 1634 as a part of the settlement of Satuit (later Scituate), which encompassed present-day Scituate and Norwell. It was officially created in 1849 and soon became known as South Scituate. The town changed its name by ballot to Norwell in 1888, after Henry Norwell (1832–1903), a dry goods merchant who provided funds for the maintenance of the town roads. Early settlers were attracted to Norwell for agricultural reasons, with the town later developing a major shipbuilding industry, based on the North and Northwest rivers. Shipbuilding was a major industry in the 18th through the early 19th centuries. Some of the finest frigates, schooners, whalers, and merchant vessels were produced in Norwell. The Norwell Village Area Historic District is in the center of the town.

Today, Norwell is an affluent residential community with over 10,000 residents that has modern schools, shopping, churches, libraries, health facilities, a wildlife preserve, and other support facilities as well as three industrial parks.

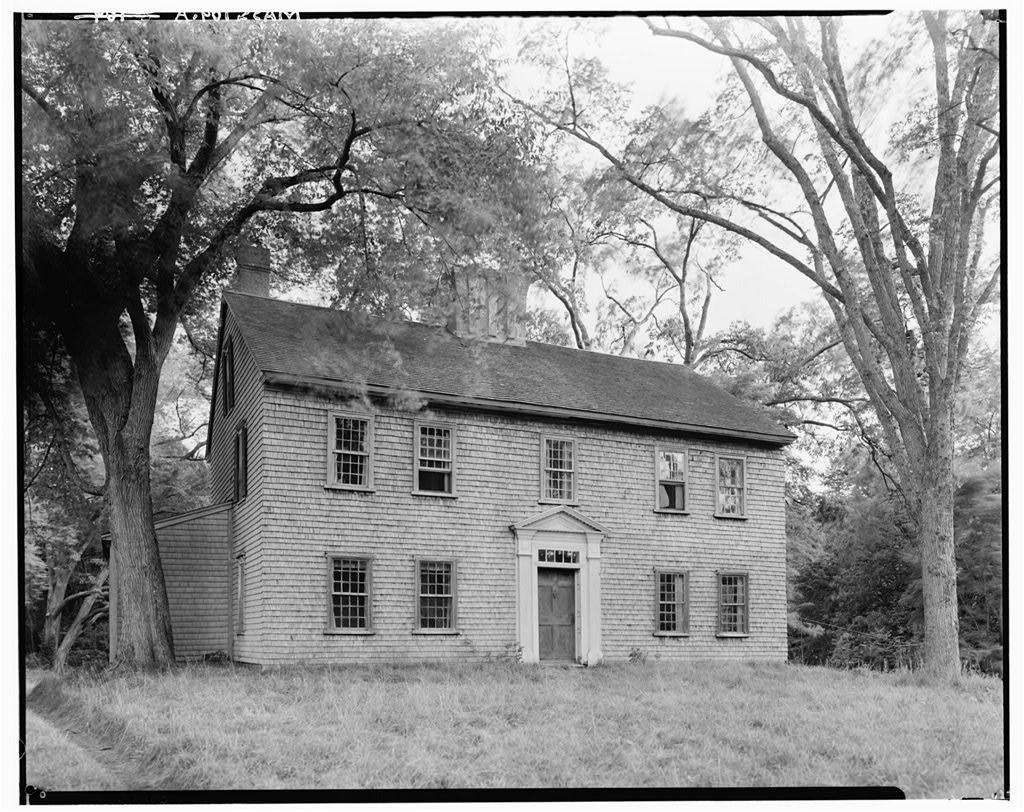
Bryant–Cushing House, built c. 1698

== Geography ==
According to the United States Census Bureau, the town has an area of 21.2 square miles (55 km^{2}), of which 20.9 square miles (54 km^{2}) is land and 0.3 square miles (0.78 km^{2}), or 1.37%, is water. Some 30% to 38% of the town is wetlands. Located on the South Shore of Massachusetts, Norwell is bordered by Hanover and Rockland on the west, Pembroke on the south, Marshfield and Scituate on the east and northeast, and Hingham on the north. Norwell is about 14 miles (23 km) east of Brockton, 17 miles (27 km) north of Plymouth and 20 miles (32 km) south of Boston.

Much of Norwell's eastern border lies along the North River, where many shipbuilding companies once stood. There are many other brooks and ponds in the town, including Third Herring Brook, which constitutes much of the town's border with Hanover, Accord Pond at the junction of Norwell, Rockland and Hingham, and Jacobs Pond, along Route 123. The northern half of the town is hilly, and the southern end of Wompatuck State Park juts into the town.

== Demographics ==
Historical population
Year	Pop.	±%
1850	1,770	—
1860	1,774	+0.2%
1870	1,661	−6.4%
1880	1,820	+9.6%
1890	1,635	−10.2%
1900	1,560	−4.6%
1910	1,410	−9.6%
1920	1,348	−4.4%
1930	1,519	+12.7%
1940	1,871	+23.2%
1950	2,515	+34.4%
1960	5,207	+107.0%
1970	7,796	+49.7%
1980	9,182	+17.8%
1990	9,279	+1.1%
2000	9,765	+5.2%
2010	10,506	+7.6%
2020	11,351	+8.0%
2023*	11,299	−0.5%
* = population estimate. Source: United States Census records and Population Estimates Program data.

As of the census of 2000, there were 9,765 people, 3,250 households, and 2,710 families residing in the town. The population density was 467.8 inhabitants per square mile (180.6/km^{2}). There were 3,318 housing units at an average density of 158.9 per square mile (61.4/km^{2}). The racial makeup of the town was 97.58% White, 0.37% African American, 0.05% Native American, 1.16% Asian, 0.16% from other races, and 0.68% from two or more races. Hispanic or Latino of any race were 0.63% of the population.

There were 3,250 households, out of which 42.2% had children under the age of 18 living with them, 74.6% were married couples living together, 6.5% had a female householder with no husband present, and 16.6% were non-families. 14.2% of all households were made up of individuals, and 6.9% had someone living alone who was 65 years of age or older. The average household size was 2.94 and the average family size was 3.27.

In the town, the population was spread out, with 28.6% under the age of 18, 4.3% from 18 to 24, 25.6% from 25 to 44, 28.9% from 45 to 64, and 12.6% who were 65 years of age or older. The median age was 40 years. For every 100 females, there were 95.5 males. For every 100 females age 18 and over, there were 90.6 males.

The median income for a household in the town was $113,944, and the median income for a family was $122,222. Males had a median income of $66,406 versus $40,625 for females. The per capita income for the town was $48,440. About 1.4% of families and 1.9% of the population were below the poverty line, including 1.9% of those under age 18 and 2.2% of those age 65 or over.

== Government ==
On the national level, Norwell is a part of Massachusetts's 9th congressional district, represented by Bill Keating. The state's junior (Class II) member of the United States Senate, elected in 2013, is Ed Markey. The senior (Class I) senator, elected in 2012, is Elizabeth Warren.

On the state level, Norwell is represented in the Massachusetts House of Representatives as a part of the Fifth Plymouth district by David DeCoste, which includes the neighboring towns of Hanover and Rockland. The town is represented in the Massachusetts Senate by Patrick O'Connor as a part of the Plymouth and Norfolk district, which includes Cohasset, Duxbury, Hingham, Hull, Marshfield, Scituate, and Weymouth. The town is home to the First Barracks of Troop D of the Massachusetts State Police.

Norwell is governed on the local level by the open town meeting form of government, and is led by a Town Administrator and a board of selectmen. The town operates its own police and fire departments. In 2015 a new police headquarters building was added to the Fire Department Headquarters, originally built in 1999, on Route 53 on the west side of town. Emergency Communications have been consolidated with the towns of Hingham, Cohasset, and Hull in Hingham. Norwell has an emergency services division within the Fire Department; all emergency room visits are brought to South Shore Hospital. The town has its own post office, at the town's center.

There are three libraries in the town, two of them independent. The Norwell Public Library, temporarily relocated to Route 53 in Hanover while a new facility is under construction behind the high school near Assinippi, belongs to the Old Colony Library Network (OCLN). The James Library and Center for the Arts is near the town center, and is associated with the First Parish Church of Norwell. The James Library was founded by Josiah Leavitt James of Chicago, a former resident of South Scituate, who was persuaded by William Hamilton Fish, minister of First Parish Church, to fund a town library. The South Shore Natural Science Center, next to Jacobs Pond, also has a small nature library.

Voter Registration and Party Enrollment as of October 15, 2008
Party	Number of Voters	Percentage
Democratic	1,829	23.89%
Republican	1,543	20.15%
Unaffiliated	4,263	55.68%
Libertarian	21	0.27%
Total	7,656	100%

== Education ==
Public education is administered by Norwell Public Schools. Schools in Norwell include:

- Grace Farrar Cole School (Elementary)
- William Gould Vinal School (Elementary)
- Norwell Middle School
- Norwell High School

== Infrastructure ==
=== Transportation ===
Massachusetts Route 3 passes through Norwell twice, across the southern portion of the town and another short portion near the west of the town. There are no exits in the town off this freeway, but there are exits, 13 and 14, between the two portions and just north of the second portion. Both exits access routes that immediately enter the town. The major route through the town is Route 123, which passes from east to west through the town, just before its end at Route 3A in Scituate. Routes 53 and 228 also pass through the town, with 228 ending just over the town line in Rockland at its intersection with Route 3.

Norwell has no rail or air service. The nearest rail service is the Greenbush line of the MBTA's commuter rail in Scituate, one mile from the Norwell town line. The nearest regional airport is Marshfield Municipal Airport; the nearest national and international service is at Logan International Airport in Boston.

Norwell began construction of "pathways" in 2015. These mixed-use pedestrian and cycling paths are designed to connect the high school, middle school, and the town center. They are intended, according to the former town planner, to allow residents and students to travel without walking on the side of Norwell's busiest roads. "Pathway" planning in Norwell has not been without controversy between town boards and residents. After a successful ten-taxpayer lawsuit that prohibited the use of Community Preservation funds from building what one town official called, instead of a sidewalk, a "pathwalk," along Norwell's busiest road (Route 123) only 600' parallel north of the pathway, voters approved the necessary appropriations to build part of it. The pathway stretches from South Street to the town center near the state police barracks. Norwell residents can now walk along the forested pathway or the less frequented, traditional sidewalk along Main Street. Main Street remains the only road in town for which taxpayers have provided funding for both a pathway on one side and a sidewalk on the other.

== Notable people ==
- Gleason Archer, summer resident, Christian theologian
- Gleason Archer, Sr., summer resident, founder of Suffolk Law School
- Jan Brett, children's author/illustrator
- William P. Brooks, American agricultural scientist
- John Cheever, author of Falconer and The Wapshot Chronicle, is buried in Norwell
- Drew Commesso, hockey player
- Jennifer Coolidge, actress
- Jeff Corwin, naturalist, television show host on Animal Planet
- Charles N. Gardner, Medal of Honor recipient during the Civil War
- Hannah Packard James (1835–1903), librarian
- Eric Maleson, Olympic Bobsled Athlete, 2002 Olympics
- Les Sampou, folk singer and songwriter
- John R. Stilgoe, American historian. Stilgoe was born in Norwell.
- Dan Wetzel, sportswriter
- Laura Wilson, photographer raised in Norwell. Her son is actor Owen Wilson
- Armand Zildjian (1921–2002), manufacturer of cymbals and head of the Norwell-headquartered Avedis Zildjian Company
- Susan Tedeschi, singer and guitarist, lead member of the Tedeschi Trucks Band
