= Bryant–Cushing House =

Historic house in Massachusetts, United States

- U.S. National Register of Historic Places
- U.S. Historic district – Contributing property
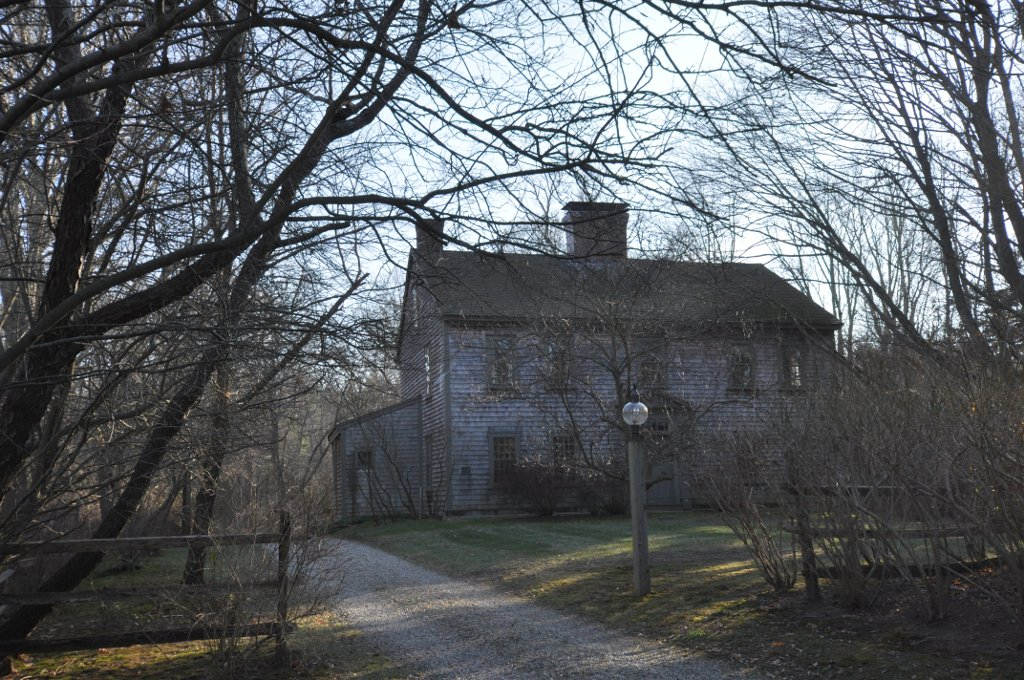

- Location within Massachusetts Location within the United States
- Location: Norwell, Massachusetts
- Coordinates: 42°9′35″N 70°47′14″W
- Area: 3.75 acres (1.52 ha)
- Built: 1698
- Architect: Thomas Bryant
- Part of: Norwell Village Area Historic District (ID82004432)
- NRHP reference No.: 76001613

Significant dates
- Added to NRHP: March 26, 1976
- Designated CP: March 26, 1976

The Bryant–Cushing House is a historic First Period house at 768 Main Street in Norwell, Massachusetts. The oldest portion of this 2 1/2-story wood-frame house was built c. 1698 by Deacon Thomas Bryant. It is five bays wide and two deep, and has a large central chimney. The main entrance is centered on the front facade, and is flanked by fluted pilasters supporting a pediment. The house was in the locally prominent Cushing family for roughly two hundred years. Much of the land formerly associated with the house now forms part of the adjacent Norris Reservation, conservation land owned by The Trustees of Reservations.

The house was listed on the National Register of Historic Places, and included in the Norwell Village Area Historic District, in 1976.

== See also ==
- List of the oldest buildings in Massachusetts
- National Register of Historic Places listings in Plymouth County, Massachusetts

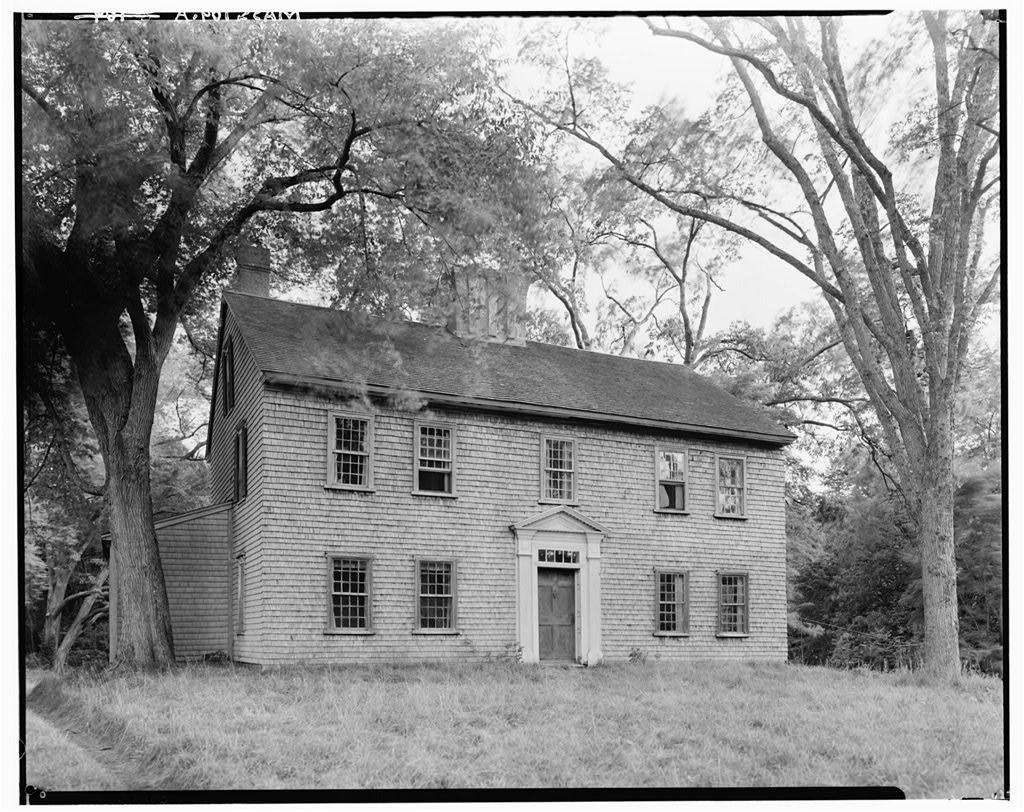
HABS photo, 1934
