= Osborn Street School =

- U.S. National Register of Historic Places
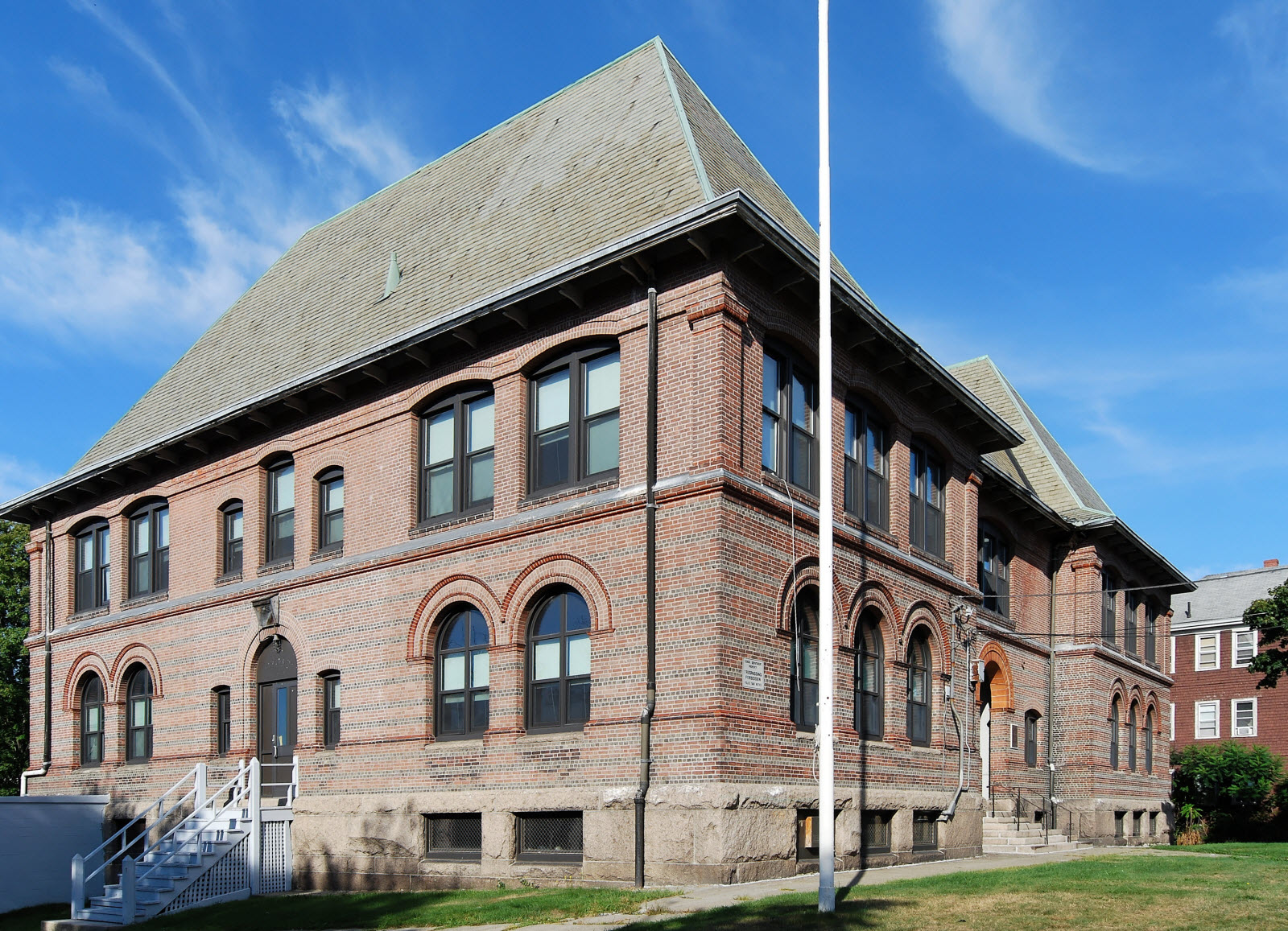

- Location within Massachusetts Location within the United States
- Location: Fall River, Massachusetts
- Coordinates: 41°41′33″N 71°10′01″W
- Built: 1893
- Architect: Frank Irving Cooper
- Architectural style: Romanesque
- MPS: Fall River MRA
- NRHP reference No.: 83000699
- Added to NRHP: February 16, 1983

The Osborn Street School is a historic school building located at 160 Osborn Street in Fall River, Massachusetts. It was built in 1893, to replace an earlier schoolhouse on the same site. It also briefly served as the city's normal school for training new teachers before it was moved to the William S. Greene School.

The school was one of nine new grammar schools built in the city during the 1890s. It was designed by Frank Irving Cooper, who also designed the similar Coughlin School, along with many other schools throughout New England. It was added to the National Register of Historic Places in 1983.

The Osborn Street School was one of about a dozen elementary schools closed in June 2008 by the city. Students were transferred to the newly built Carlton M. Vivieros Elementary School.

== See also ==
- National Register of Historic Places listings in Fall River, Massachusetts
