= Luzerne County Library System =

Coordinates: 41.246037°N 75.884899°W

- Location: Osterhout Free Library; 71 S. Franklin Street; Wilkes-Barre, PA 18701
- Scope: Luzerne County
- Established: 1984

Access and use
- Population served: 320,000

Other information
- Director: Richard C. Miller
- Website: http://luzernelibraries.org

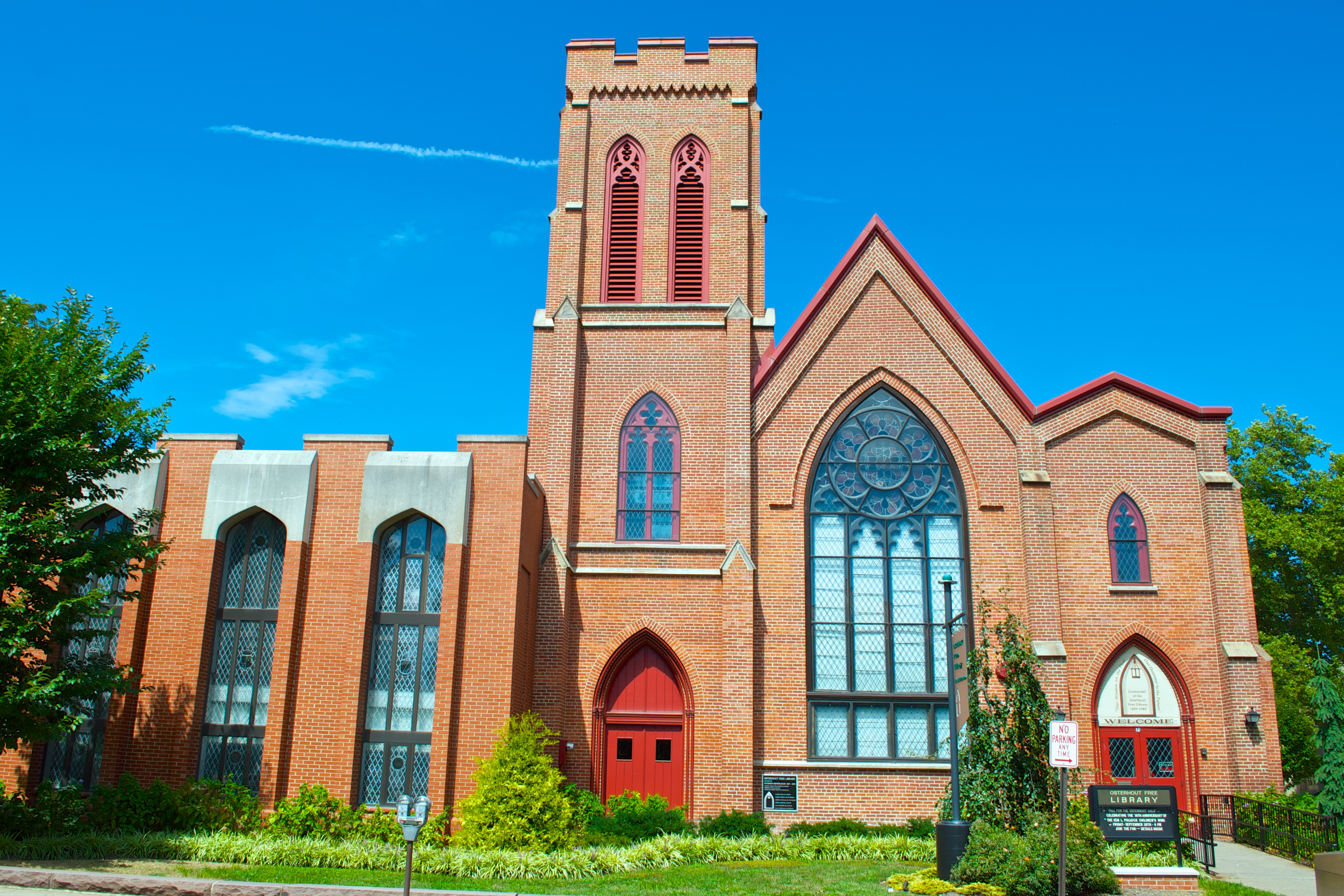
Osterhout Free Library in Wilkes-Barre

The Luzerne County Library System (LCLS) is an organization that administers ten libraries in Luzerne County, Pennsylvania. Founded in 1984, it is headquartered at the Osterhout Free Library in Wilkes-Barre, Pennsylvania. Along with hosting various permanent and temporary collections of books and media, the member libraries provide various services and activities.

== Description ==
Isaac Smith Osterhout willed a substantial portion of his estate for the establishment of a free public library. In 1887, the board of directors hired Melvil Dewey, creator of the Dewey decimal system, to act as an adviser. Dewey recommended that the board buy the First Presbyterian Church, an edifice built in 1849, and use it for approximately 10 years until permanent arrangements could be made. As it happened, this became the permanent arrangement. The Gothic architecture of the church proved quite suitable for a library. The library trustees hired Hannah Packard James to be the first head librarian and assigned her the task of organizing and preparing the library for its grand opening. The original library collection (approximately 10,000 volumes) consisted of books from Osterhout's personal collection, part of the Atheneum (a local subscription library), and 9,500 volumes purchased from Charles Scribner and Sons. The Osterhout Free Library finally opened its doors to the public on January 29, 1889, and was one of the first libraries in Northeastern Pennsylvania.

Founded in 1984, the Luzerne County Library System (LCLS) is an organization that administers ten libraries in Luzerne County, Pennsylvania. It is headquartered at the Osterhout Free Library in Wilkes-Barre, Pennsylvania. A library card from any member library allows patrons to borrow books and media from one library and return it to another.

== Libraries ==
The library system comprises

- Back Mountain Memorial Library, Back Mountain
- Hazleton Area Public Library, Hazleton
- Hoyt Library, Kingston
- Marian Sutherland Kirby Library, Mountaintop
- Mill Memorial Library, Nanticoke
- Osterhout Free Library, Wilkes-Barre
- Pittston Memorial Library, Pittston
- Plymouth Public Library, Plymouth
- West Pittston Library, West Pittston
- Wyoming Free Library, Wyoming

== Collections ==
Along with permanent collections that include microfilm of old newspapers, the libraries host various temporary collections of art or memorabilia.

== Services ==
The system has hosted lecture series about the history of the region it serves. It has activities for children, an annual Summer reading program, and an annual book sale at the Osterhout Free Library. The Osterhout has an immigration resource center, partially funded by grants. Some activities aimed at adults have included adult coloring books.
