= Frank Irving Cooper =

American architect

- Born: May 8, 1867; Taunton, Massachusetts
- Died: October 23, 1933 (aged 66); Wayland, Massachusetts
- Occupation: Architect
- Buildings: Bristol County Superior Courthouse; Coughlin School; Osborn Street School

Frank Irving Cooper (May 8, 1867 – October 23, 1933) was an American architect from Massachusetts who designed many public buildings during his career, including the Bristol County Superior Courthouse in Taunton, Massachusetts, and dozens of school buildings throughout New England. Throughout his career, Cooper established himself as an expert on improved school design and planning, serving on various committees, and authoring numerous books and papers on the subject.

== Biography and career ==
Frank Irving Cooper was the only son of Joseph John Cooper and Mary A. Nichols, of Taunton, Massachusetts. His father was a skilled tack maker who earned the rank of Major during the Civil War.

Cooper studied architecture and engineering and began his career as a draftsman for H.H. Richardson which became Shepley, Rutan and Coolidge after Richardson's death in 1886. Among his early roles was as supervising architect for the construction of the Allegheny County Courthouse in Pittsburgh, and later Shadyside Presbyterian Church, in that same city. Soon after the completion of Shadyside Presbyterian, Cooper established his own firm with offices in Boston and Pittsburgh In 1890, he married Anna Wellington Sawyer of Bridgewater, Massachusetts. They had three sons and settled in Wayland, Massachusetts

Cooper later partnered with Elmer Smith Bailey, forming the firm of Cooper & Bailey, with an office at 33 Cornhill in Boston. From their Boston office, the focused their work almost entirely on the design of new schools throughout New England. Their works during this period include the 1907 Winslow School in Beverly, Massachusetts, and the 1911 Atherton Hough School in Quincy, Massachusetts.

In 1916, the firm was reorganized as Frank Irving Cooper Corporation, after Bailey had retired in 1914. After his death in 1933, Frank Irving Cooper Corporation continued designing schools under the leadership of his son Gregory.

== Gallery of selected works ==
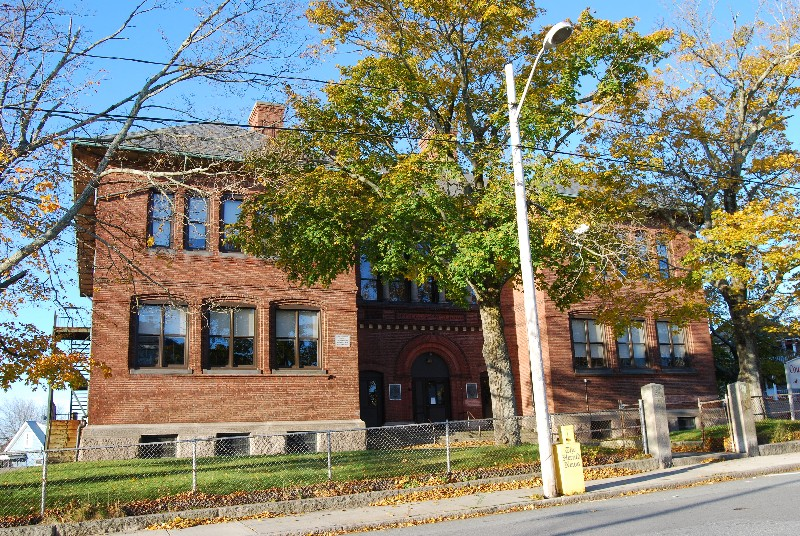
Coughlin School, 1893, Fall River, Massachusetts

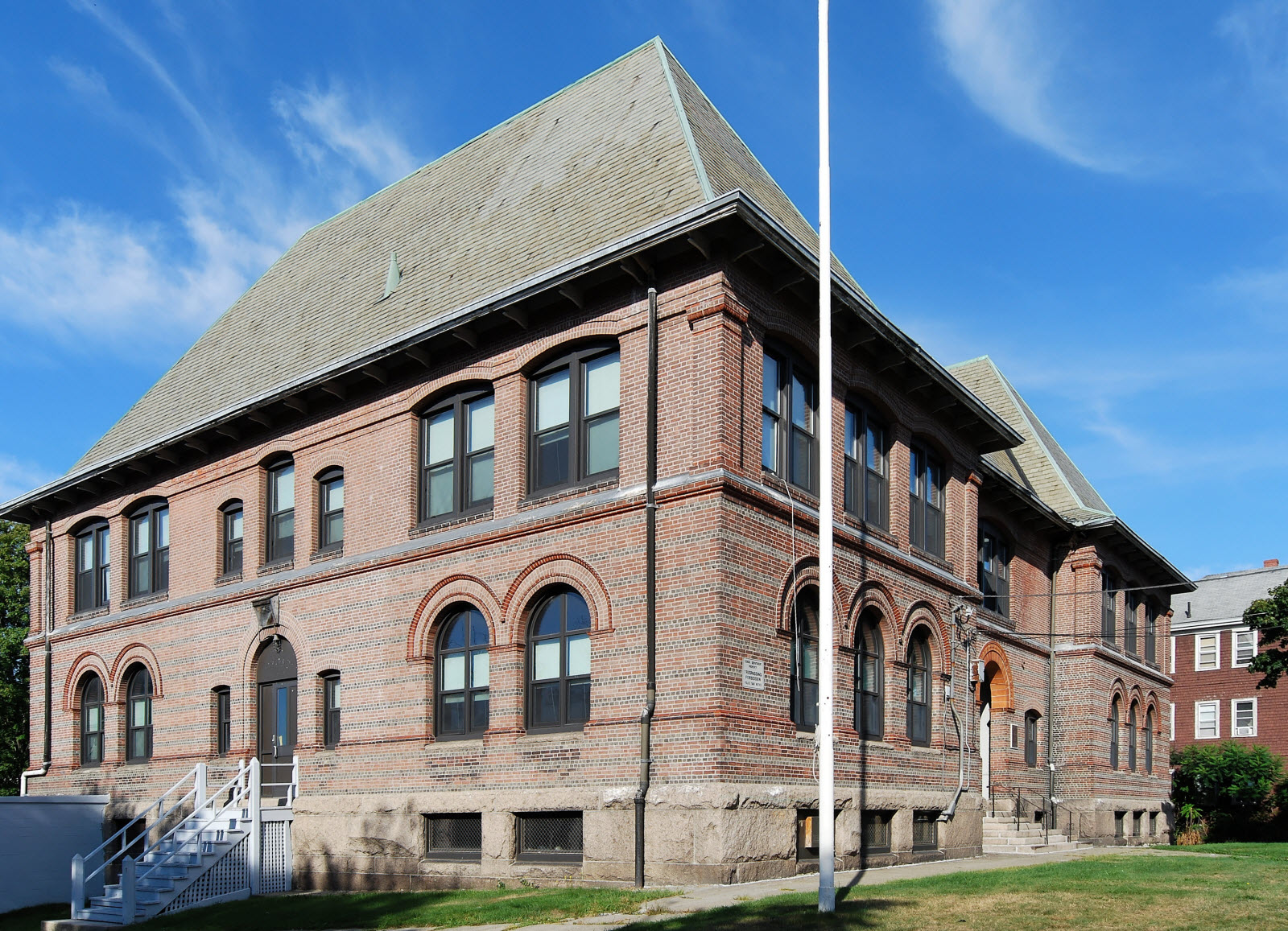
Osborn Street School, 1893, Fall River, Massachusetts

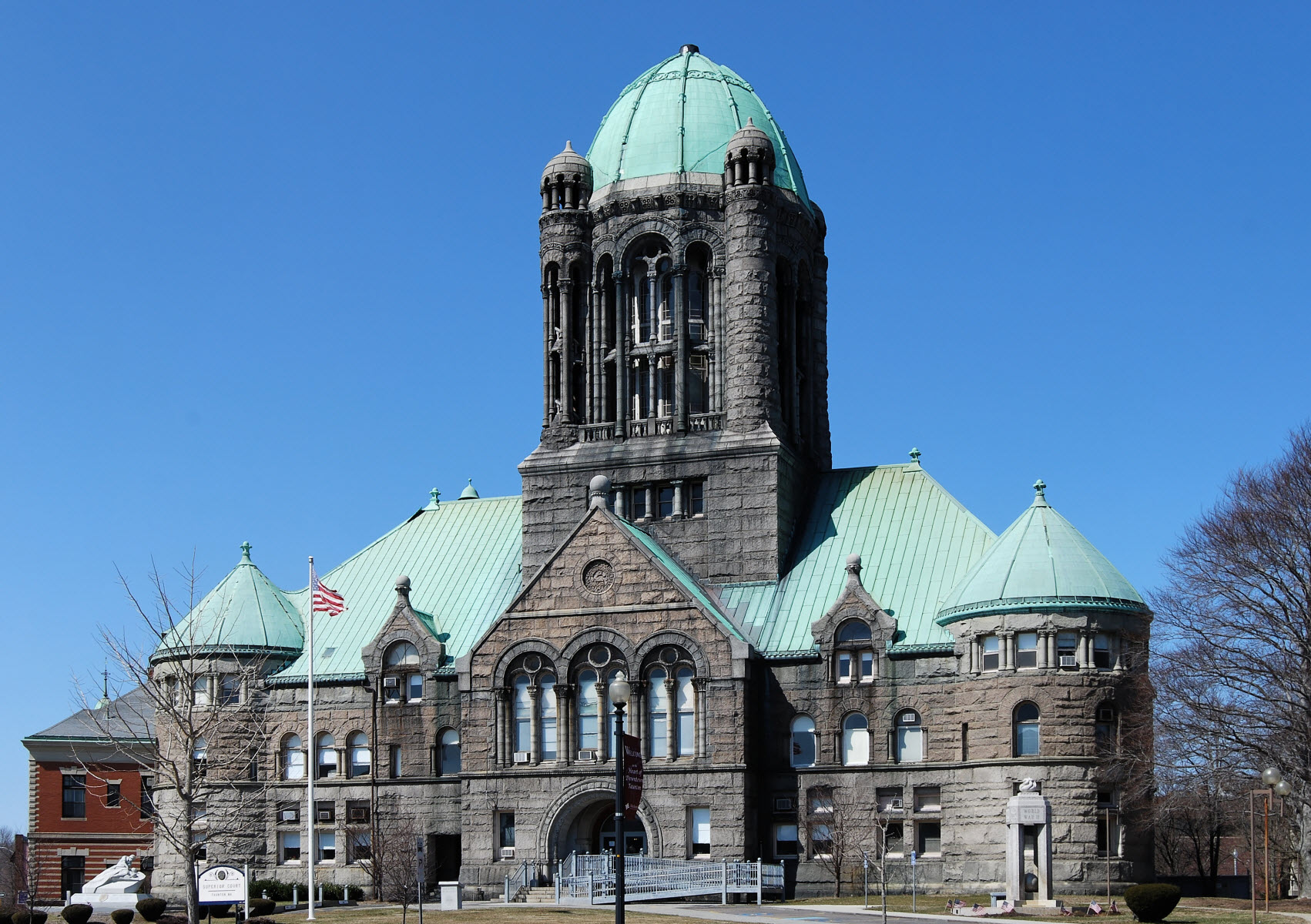
Bristol County Superior Courthouse, 1894, Taunton, Massachusetts

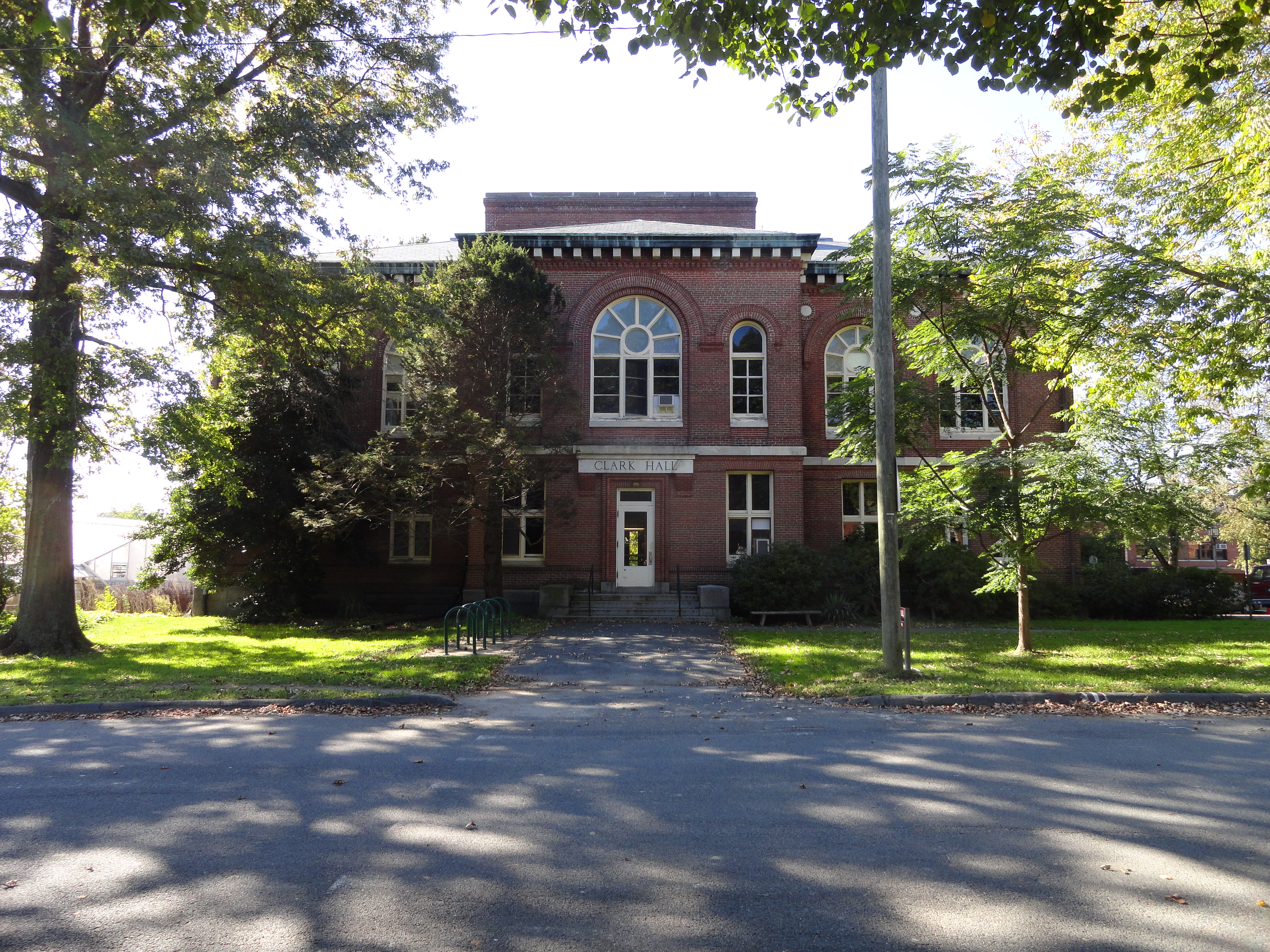
Clark Hall, University of Massachusetts, Amherst, 1907 (Cooper & Bailey)

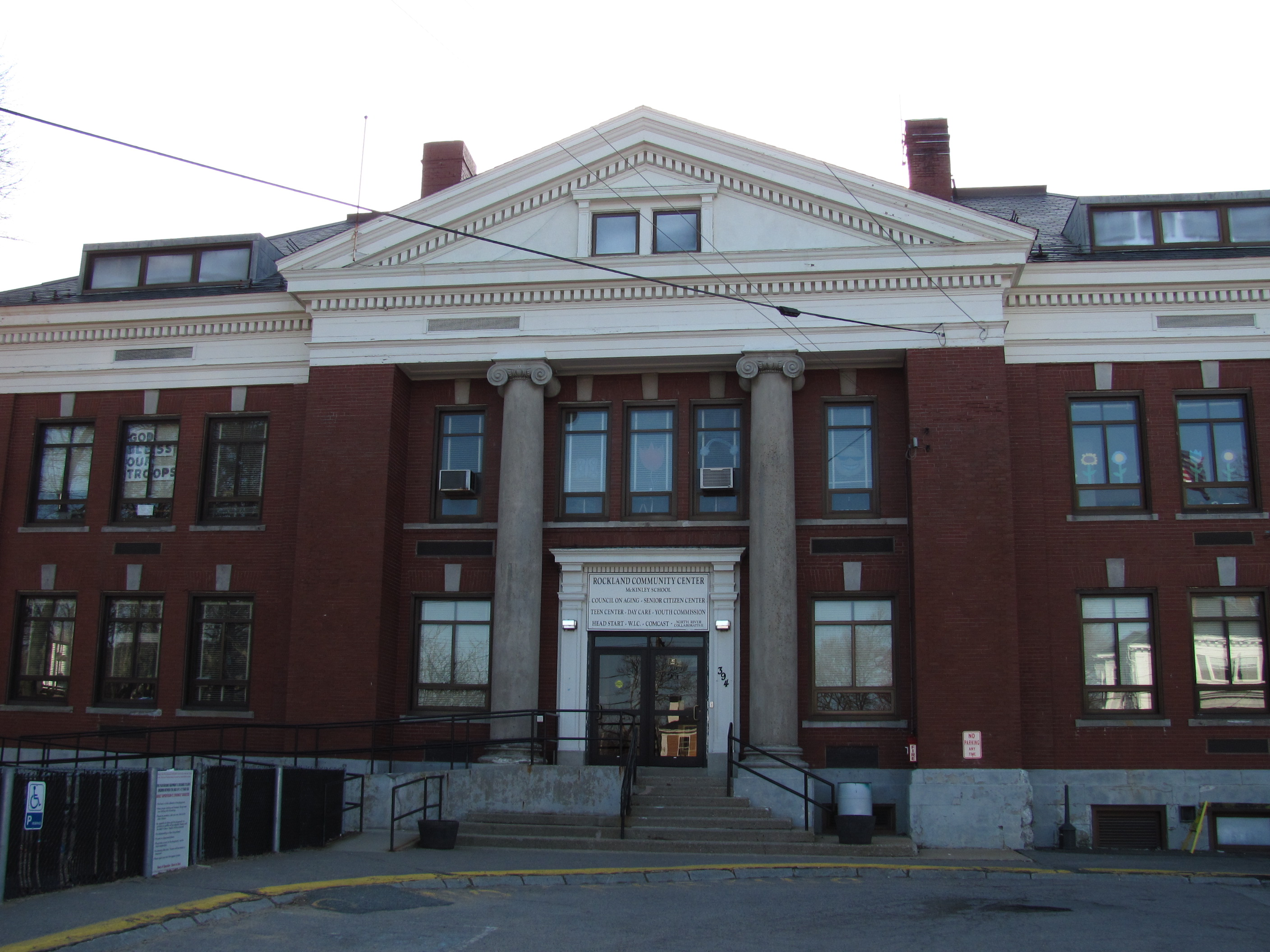
Rockland High School (1909) (Cooper & Bailey)
