= Studleys Pond =

Lake of the United States of America

- Reed's Pond
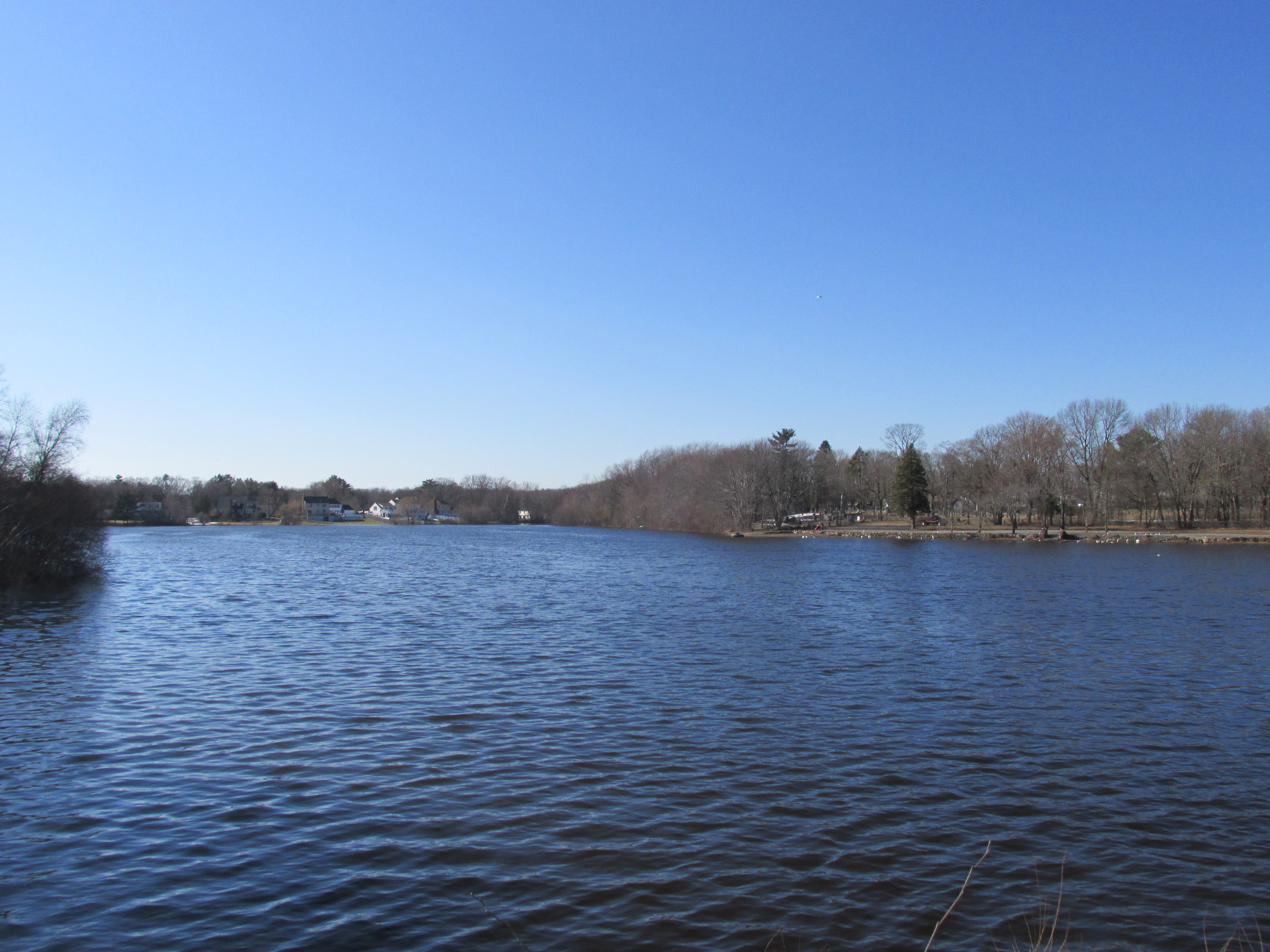
- Studleys Pond

- Location within Massachusetts
- Location: Rockland, Massachusetts
- Coordinates: 42°07′11″N 70°55′13″W
- Primary inflows: French Stream
- Primary outflows: French Stream
- Basin countries: United States
- Surface area: 29 acres (12 ha)
- Islands: Gideon's Island

Studleys Pond, known locally as Reed's Pond, is a 29-acre (120,000 m^{2}) pond in Rockland, Massachusetts. The pond is located south of Rockland Center on Route 123, 0.1-mile (0.16 km) west of Route 139. The French Stream flows through the pond. Gideon's Island, named after Gideon Studley, lies in the southern portion of the pond. Thomas V. Mahon Park, a park which is owned by the Town of Rockland and is accessible from Route 123, lies along the southern shore of the pond.
