= Accord Pond =

Lake in Massachusetts, USA

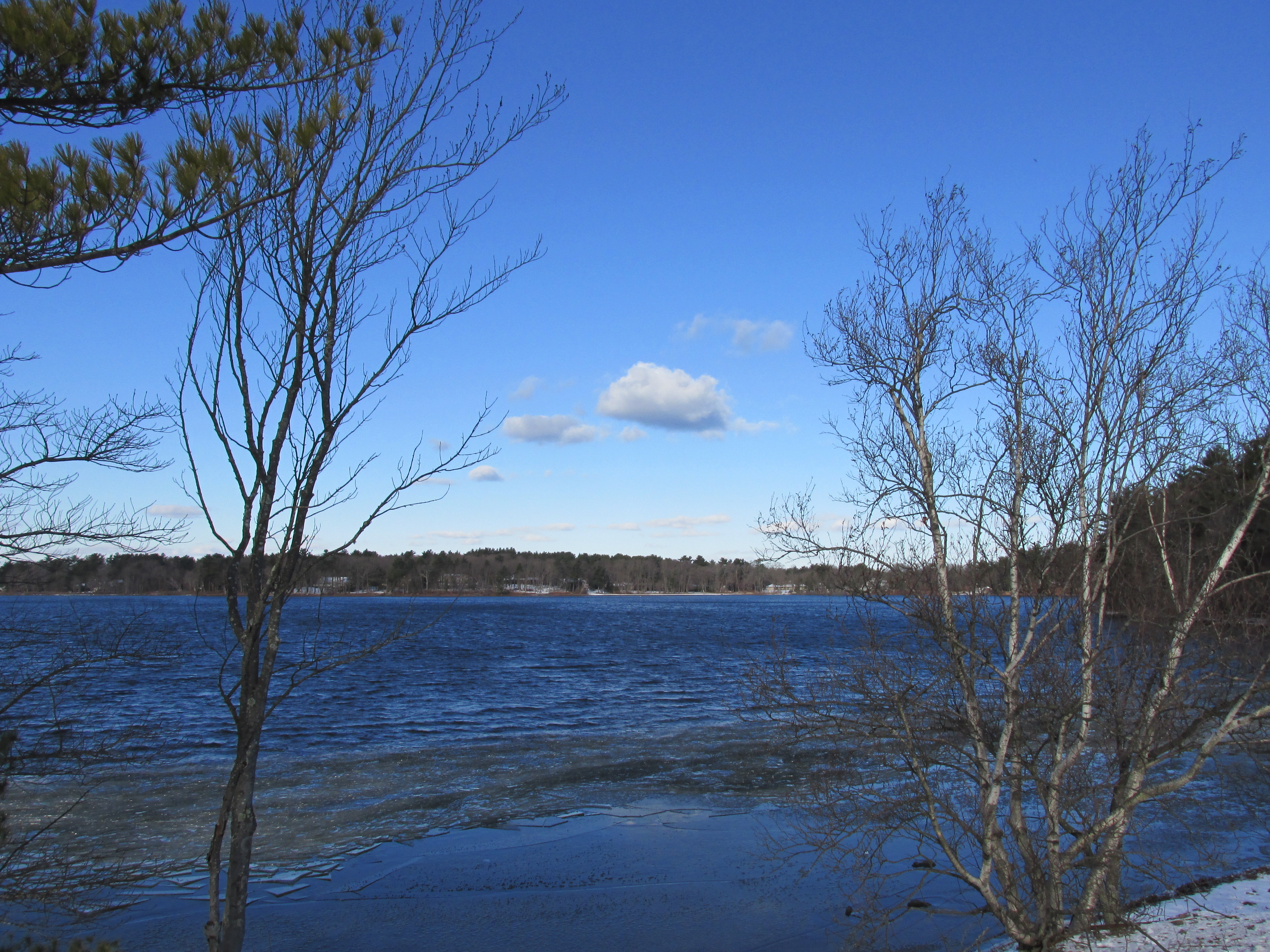
- Accord Pond

- Location within Massachusetts Location within the United States
- Location: Hingham, Norwell and Rockland, Massachusetts
- Coordinates: 42°10′24″N 70°53′24″W
- Type: reservoir
- Primary outflows: Accord Brook
- Basin countries: United States
- Surface area: 100 acres (40 ha)
- Surface elevation: 141 ft (43 m)
- Settlements: Accord

Accord Pond is a 100-acre (0.40 km^{2}) reservoir in Hingham, Norwell and Rockland, Massachusetts. The reservoir is located off Route 228 at its terminus with Route 3. The reservoir is visible from Route 3 northbound at Exit 14, the Route 228 off-ramp. The reservoir is a Class A source of water supply for the town of Hingham and Hull Ma. The outflow of the reservoir is Accord Brook, a tributary of the Weir River.

Accord, a village in Hingham on the Hingham/Norwell town line, lies on the northeastern shore of the reservoir along Route 53. Being a public water supply, swimming, boating and fishing are not allowed.

The pond is named for an accord (treaty) made there in early colonial times between local Indians and English settlers.

In the 1870s plans were made for constructing a town water supply using Accord Pond, and work at the Accord Pond end began in 1879. The gates feeding water into the pipes, which activated the system, were opened on June 23, 1880.
