= Bristol County Courthouse Complex =

- U.S. National Register of Historic Places
- U.S. Historic district
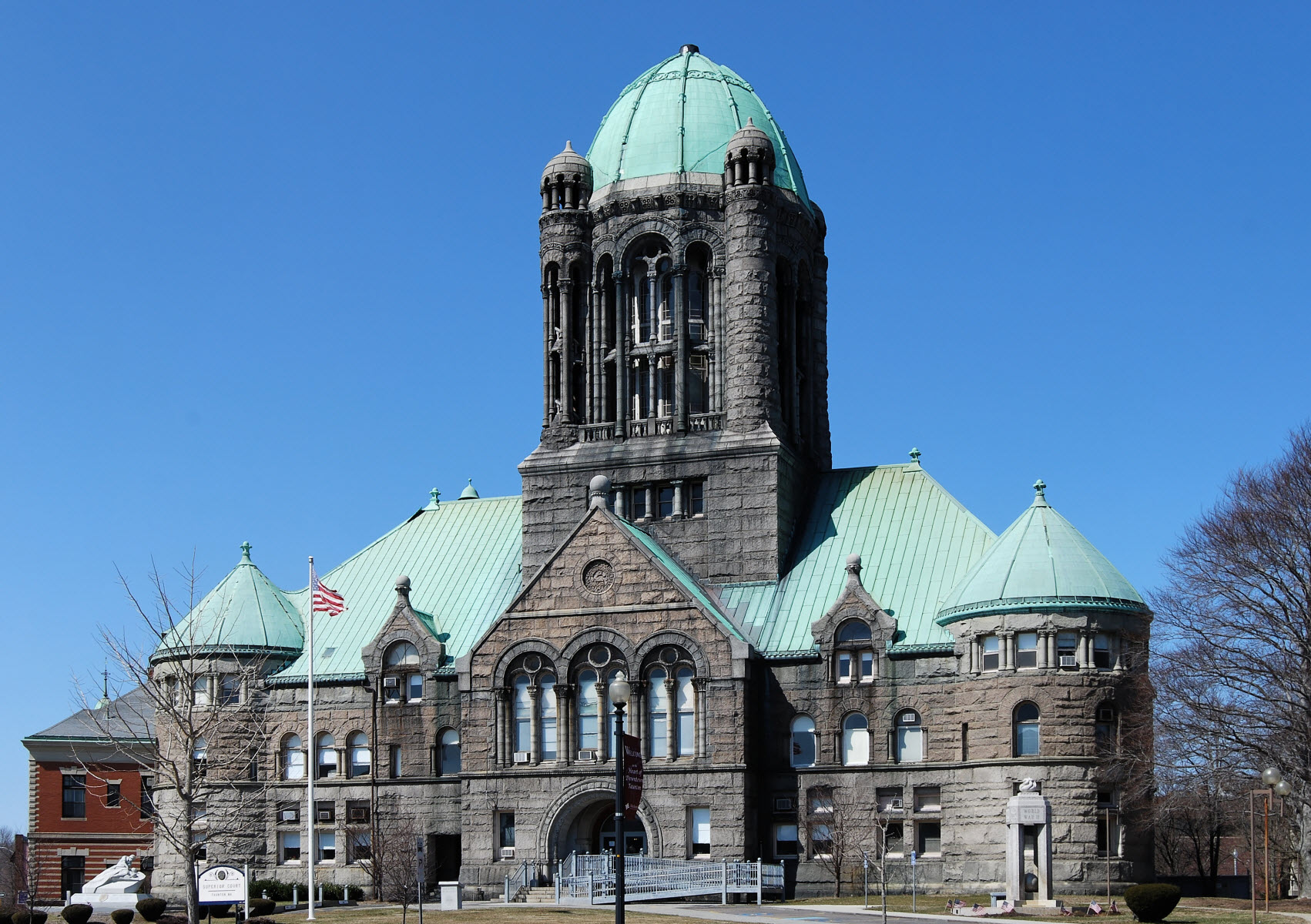
- Superior Courthouse, 2008

- Location within Massachusetts Location within the United States
- Location: 9, 11, 15 Court St.; Taunton, Massachusetts
- Coordinates: 41.9145°N 71.0925°W
- Area: 13 acres (5 ha)
- Built: 1826, 1894, 1904
- Architect: Frank Irving Cooper, Albion Marble
- NRHP reference No.: 78000427
- Added to NRHP: March 28, 1978

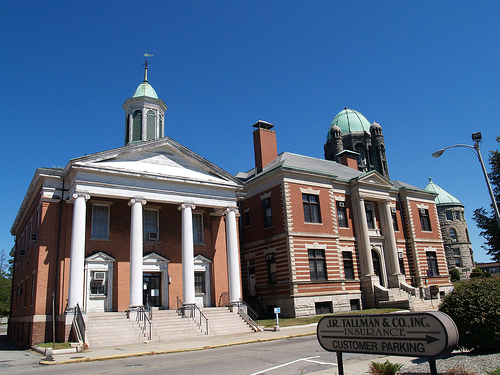
Court Street, Taunton

Bristol County Superior Courthouse in Taunton.

The Bristol County Courthouse Complex Historic District contains three historic buildings located along Court Street in Taunton, Massachusetts, including the Bristol County Superior Courthouse, the Bristol County Registry of Deeds and the former First District Courthouse. The city's Korean War and World War II Memorials are also located on the lawn in front of the superior courthouse. The Bristol County Courthouse Complex directly abuts the Taunton Green Historic District, the City's central square.

In 2008, an $86 million expansion and renovation project began at the site which is scheduled to include the construction of a new trial court and restoration of the superior courthouse.

== Bristol County Superior Courthouse ==
The Bristol County Superior Courthouse was designed by architect Frank Irving Cooper from nearby Bridgewater and built in 1894 in the Romanesque-style. The stone structure contains a 170-foot (52 m) tall central tower capped with a copper-clad dome, constructed of Guastavino tile. The building's large hip roof is also entirely clad in copper. The superior courthouse is the fourth courthouse to be located on or near this site since 1747, when Taunton became the shire town (county seat) for Bristol County, Massachusetts, after Bristol was split off from the Bay State and became part of Rhode Island.

The dome was originally topped with a 15-foot copper flame, which was taken down in 2003 after being deemed a "potential hazard." Despite some calls to restore it, the 300-pound torch remains in storage as of 2015. On March 13, 2025, the torch was restored to the top of the dome.

Since 2013, the courthouse has been home to a pair of nesting peregrine falcons.

Bristol County, Massachusetts, also contains historic superior courthouses in Fall River and New Bedford.

=== Law Library ===
The district's law library is located in the upper floor dome section of the courthouse. It includes dozens of stacks of various law-related publications, including other library services.

=== War memorials ===
Located on the front lawn of the superior courthouse are the city of Taunton's memorials to the World War II (installed in 1987) and the Korean War (installed in 1988).

== Bristol County Registry of Deeds ==
The Bristol County Registry of Deeds is located at 11 Court Street, just north of the superior courthouse. It was built in 1904 and designed by architect Albion M. Marble of Fall River. It is constructed in brick and limestone in the Colonial Revival style. Together with a location in Attleboro, the Registry of Deeds contains all the property transaction records for the northern part of Bristol County, Massachusetts.

== Taunton District Courthouse ==
The former Taunton District Courthouse is a Greek Revival-style building located at 15 Court Street. It was originally constructed in 1826 as the county courthouse at the site of the current superior courthouse, but moved to its current location in the 1890s. Constructed in red brick, the building features a white wooden portico and copper-capped cupola on the roof.

The building has been plagued by water leakage and other structural problems, and also did not meet current ADA regulations which led to the district court business to be moved to a temporary location in the city of Taunton.

Court activity ceased in 2008 and the building remained vacant until being purchased at auction in 2012. In 2018 the purchaser opened the newly restored building to the public as a theater named the District Center for the Arts. In addition to structural improvements an elevator was built making the building ADA compliant.

== See also ==
- National Register of Historic Places listings in Taunton, Massachusetts
