= Hannah Packard James =

American librarian

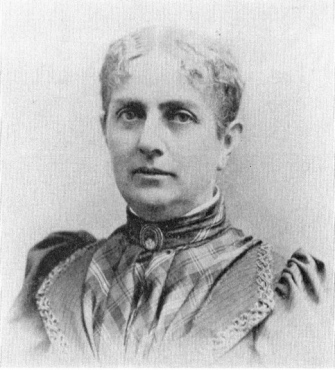
- Born: September 5, 1835; Scituate, Massachusetts
- Died: April 20, 1903 (aged 67); Norwell, Massachusetts
- Education: Boston Athenæum
- Occupation: Librarian
- Known for: A founder of the American Library Association

Hannah Packard James (September 5, 1835 – April 20, 1903) was an American librarian, a founder of the Pennsylvania Library Association and helped to create the American Library Association.

== Biography ==
Hannah Packard James was born on September 5, 1835, in South Scituate, Massachusetts, now known as Norwell. She was strongly influenced by her father, William James, who was the biggest landowner in the area.

James studied in a district school at Norwell. During her childhood, she showed a keen interest for books, and compiled her own catalog. Her training at the Boston Athenæum helped her to become a librarian at the Newton Free Library, a public library in Massachusetts, when it opened in 1870. She worked at Newton for seventeen years. While there she was actively engaging libraries with the schools and played an important role in improving children's reading.

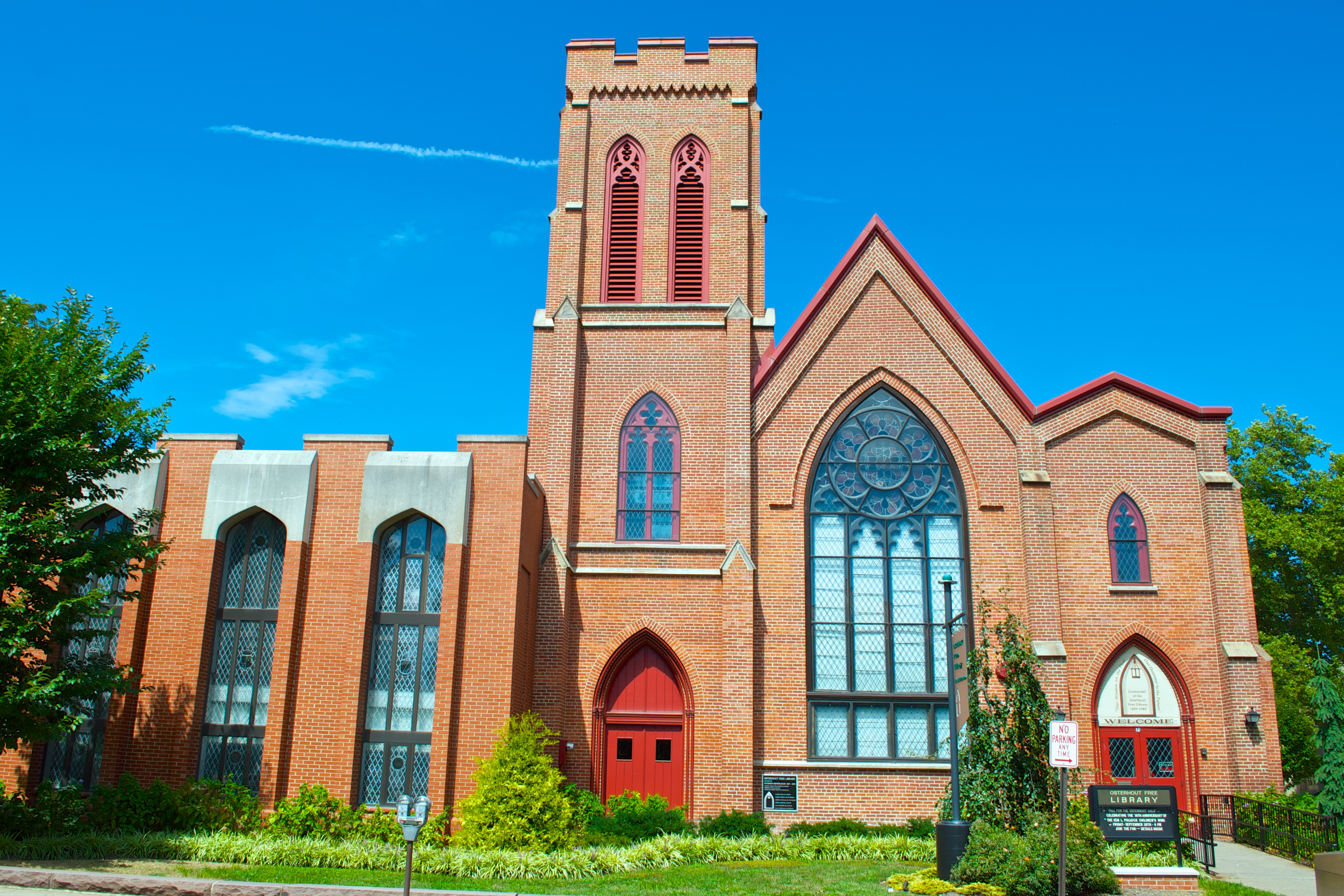
Osterhout Free Library in Wilkes Barre, Pennsylvania

By the late 1880s when she was invited to move to Wilkes-Barre, Pennsylvania, she had already built a national reputation for her work with teachers and schoolchildren. She was associated with a number of professional organizations in an effort to improve library systems, and attended various conferences. James had also lectured at the School of Library Service at Columbia University in New York, which was the first professional academic program for librarians.

At that time, Wilkes-Barre was an undeveloped city and had only a few dispersed collections of books. The city lacked a central location that could house many volumes and allow free access to men, women and children. Creating such a library was the inspiration of Isaac Osterhout, a local businessman who willed a substantial portion of his estate for the building and to retain a librarian. Soon the committee hired James to become head librarian and take control of the project. The Osterhout Free Library finally opened its doors to the public on January 29, 1889.

According to Lear, James left a substantial legacy: "the first librarian of the Osterhout Free Library in Wilkes-Barre, one of the founders of the Pennsylvania Library Association, and an early leader in the American Library Association."

In November 1902, James gave up library-related work following an illness. She died of pneumonia on April 20, 1903.
