= Albion M. Marble =

American architect

Albion Merton Marble
- Born: December 1, 1848; Fall River, Massachusetts, US
- Died: May 23, 1909; Boston, Massachusetts, US
- Occupation: Architect
- Buildings: Eldredge Public Library, Bristol County Registry of Deeds

Albion M. Marble (1 December 1848 – 23 May 1909) was an American architect from Massachusetts.

Marble was born in 1848. He attended the Massachusetts Institute of Technology, graduating in 1880. He then established himself as an architect in Fall River. During the late 1880s he left active practice, and turned up in Boston during the 1890s, where he remained until about 1904. At that point, he moved back to Fall River. After a brief time, he went on to Providence, Rhode Island. After this move, his whereabouts are unknown.

He died on May 23, 1909, in Boston. His death certificate lists his residence as Jamaica Plain.

Despite his relative obscurity, Marble designed a number of prominent buildings in southeastern Massachusetts.

== Architectural works ==
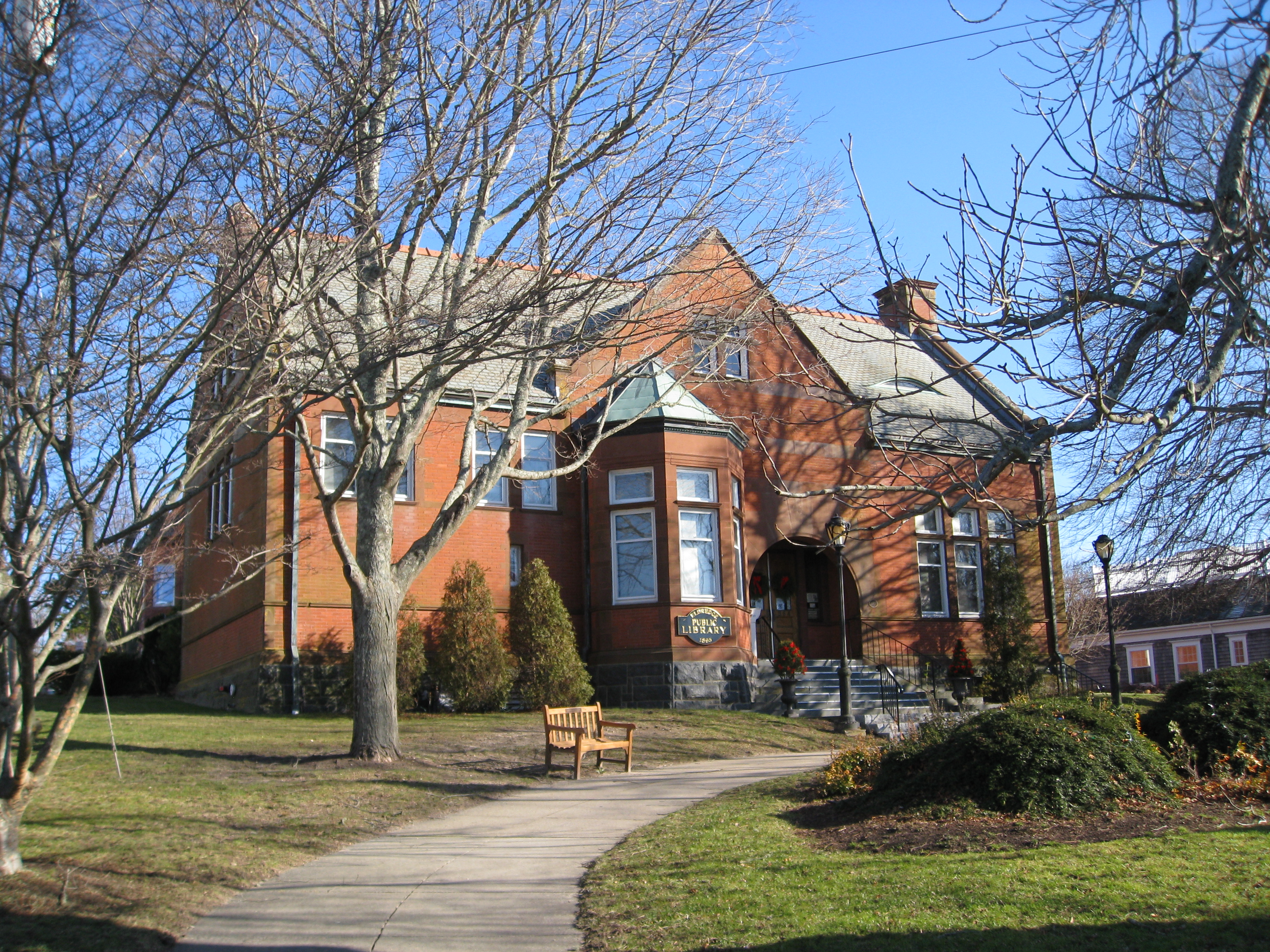
Eldredge Public Library, Chatham, 1896.

- 1896 - Eldredge Public Library, 564 Main St, Chatham, Massachusetts
- 1896 - Joseph D. Warren House, 180 Medway St, Providence, Rhode Island
- 1898 - Brayton Avenue School, 425 Brayton Ave, Fall River, Massachusetts
  - Demolished in 2012
- 1903 - Bristol County Registry of Deeds, 11 Court St, Taunton, Massachusetts
- 1904 - Watson School, Eastern Ave, Fall River, Massachusetts
