= Emerson Shoe Company =

- U.S. National Register of Historic Places
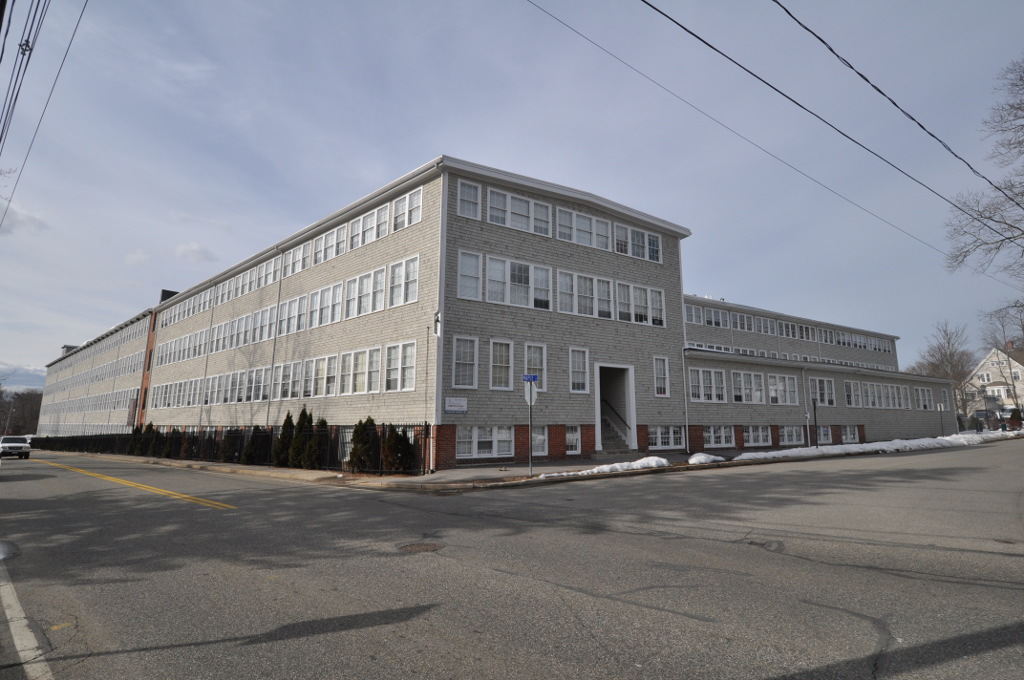

- Location within Massachusetts Location within the United States
- Location: 51 Maple St., Rockland, Massachusetts
- Area: 2 acres (0.81 ha)
- Built: c. 1891
- NRHP reference No.: 100002542
- Added to NRHP: June 1, 2018

The Emerson Shoe Company is a historic industrial property located at Maple and Plain Streets in Rockland, Massachusetts. Built about 1891 and repeatedly enlarged, it is the largest wood-frame structure in Rockland, and was home to one of its largest employers in the early 20th century. Now converted to residential use, the factory complex was listed on the National Register of Historic Places in 2018.

== Description and history ==
The former Emerson Shoe Company factory is located in a mixed industrial-residential area in Rockland, at the northwest corner of Maple and Plain Streets. Its oldest portion is a 2 1/2-story structure lining Maple Street, while additions and extensions run along Plain Street. It was built using typical timber-framed "mill construction" techniques of the 1890s and 1900s, with sections ranging in height from two to four floors.

The oldest portion of the complex was built about 1891 by Hall, Gallagher & Foulke's Shoe Company, later renamed George W. Hall & Company. In 1906 the building was purchased by R.B. Grover & Company, a Brockton-based shoemaker founded in 1889 whose factory had been destroyed by fire. Grover was best known for producing the "Emerson shoe", and renamed itself in 1901. The company was one of Rockland's biggest employers, enlarging the premises in 1906, and again in 1909 and 1916. The company failed during the Great Depression in 1931.

The factory saw a variety of industrial uses since then such as hosting commercial businesses and general workspaces. Through the 1980s and 1990s this building became known as the Codman Building and was home to as many as 30 to 40 artists but was closed down in 2006 making way for the historic factory to be converted into residential loft-style housing.

== See also ==
- National Register of Historic Places listings in Plymouth County, Massachusetts
