= Coughlin School =

- U.S. National Register of Historic Places
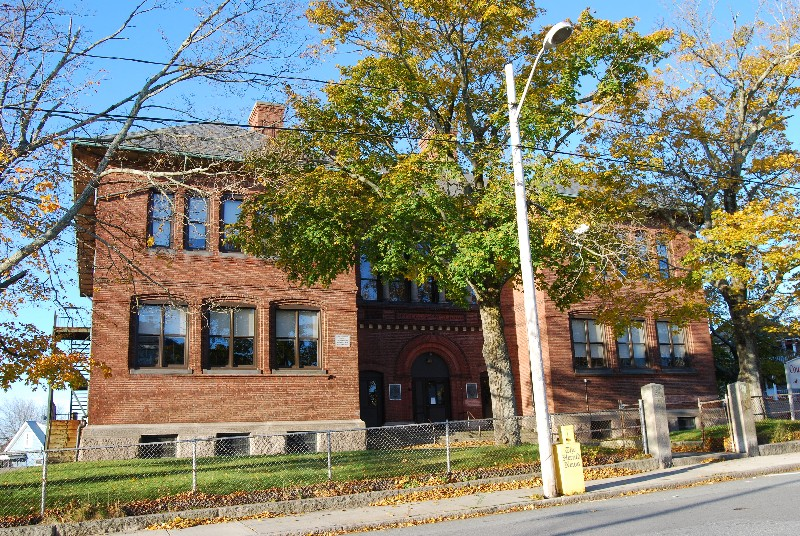

- Location within Massachusetts Location within the United States
- Location: Fall River, Massachusetts
- Coordinates: 41°41′4″N 71°7′42″W
- Built: 1893
- Architect: Frank Irving Cooper
- Architectural style: Romanesque
- MPS: Fall River MRA
- NRHP reference No.: 83000658
- Added to NRHP: February 16, 1983

Coughlin School is a historic school building located at 1975 Pleasant Street in Fall River, Massachusetts. It was built in 1893, and was one of nine new grammar schools built in the city during the 1890s. It was designed by Frank Irving Cooper, who also designed the similar Osborn Street School, along with many other schools throughout New England.

The eight room elementary school was named for Dr. John W. Coughlin, who served as mayor of Fall River during the early 1890s. It was added to the National Register of Historic Places in 1983.

The Coughlin School was one of about a dozen elementary schools closed in June 2008 by the city, with the opening of several new, larger buildings.

It suffered a fire on August 22, 2015.

== See also ==
- National Register of Historic Places listings in Fall River, Massachusetts
