= Rockland Almshouse =

- U.S. National Register of Historic Places
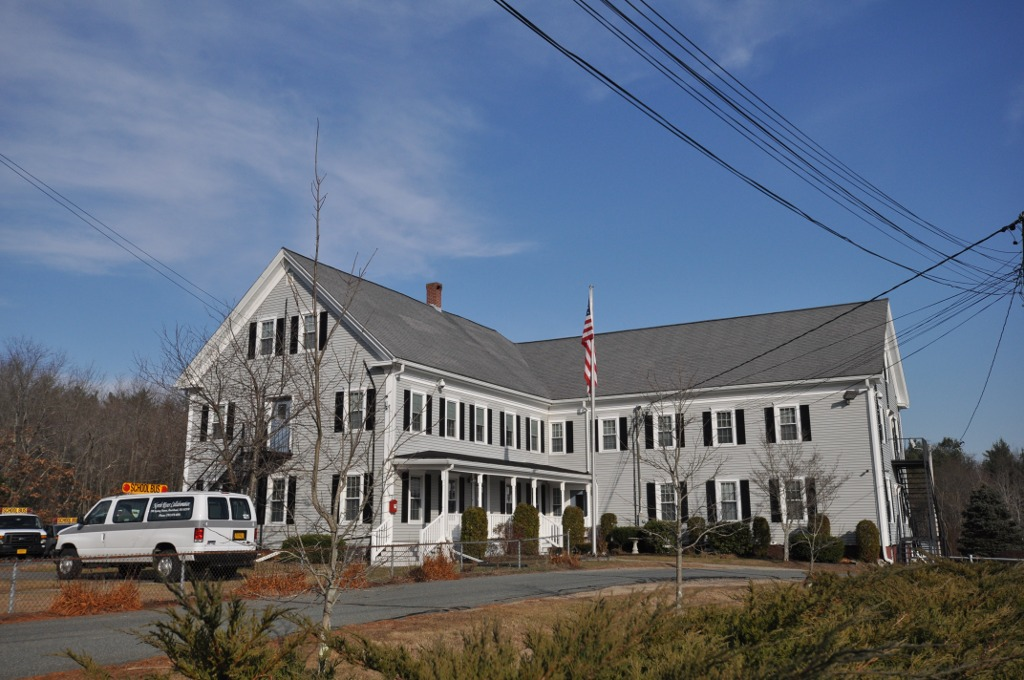

- Location within Massachusetts Location within the United States
- Location: Rockland, Massachusetts
- Coordinates: 42°6′52″N 70°54′45″W
- Built: 1876
- Architect: Reed & Kelley, Hebberd & Ames
- NRHP reference No.: 83000600
- Added to NRHP: April 28, 1983

The Rockland Almshouse is a historic almshouse at 198 Spring Street in Rockland, Massachusetts. The large 2 1/2-story L-shaped building was built in 1876, and served as a communal poor house until 1979. It is a rare well-preserved example of a 19th-century almshouse. The building was listed on the National Register of Historic Places in 1983. It is currently used as an educational facility.

== Description and history ==
The almshouse is located south of Rockland's village center, on the east side of Spring Street, a major north–south artery in the southern part of the town. The main building is an L-shaped 2 1/2-story wood-frame structure, with a gabled roof, clapboard siding, and foundation of brick and rubblestone. The east–west portion of the L has a single-story hip-roof porch extending on its southern façade, with original turned posts and balustrade. This façade is five bays wide, with the main entrance at the center bay. The west-facing gable end is three bays wide, with two sash windows in the gable, three windows on the first level, and two windows flanking a modern emergency exit on the second. The north–south portion of the building presents five bays to the west, although they are not symmetrical.

The town of Rockland was separated from Abington in 1874, and the need for the almshouse was apparently recognized soon afterward, for the first portion of this building, the east–west section, was built in 1876. The north–south wing was added in 1899, to provide an infirmary. The almshouse was closed in 1979 after more than 100 years of operation. The building has been rehabilitated, and now houses the North River Collaborative, an educational organization for children and young adults with disabilities.

== See also ==
- National Register of Historic Places listings in Plymouth County, Massachusetts
