= Hulda Barker Loud =

Massachusetts newspaper editor

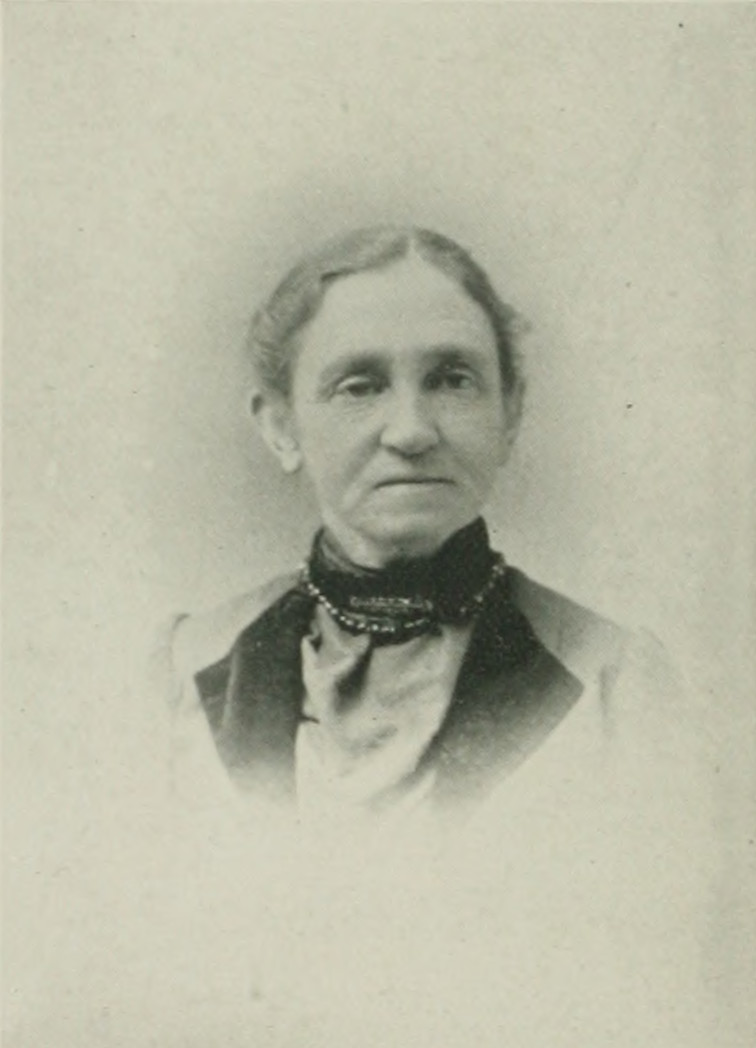
- Born: September 13, 1844; Rockland, Massachusetts
- Died: April 6, 1911 (aged 66)
- Known for: Newspaper editor

Hulda Barker Loud (September 13, 1844 – April 6, 1911) was an American newspaper editor and publisher in Massachusetts who was an advocate for labor rights and equal rights for women.

== Career ==
Hulda Barker Loud was born in East Abington (now Rockland), Massachusetts, to Reuben Loud and Betsey (Whiting) Loud. She went to public schools until, at eighteen, she became a schoolteacher. She taught in her home town the next twenty-two years, and for fifteen years she was the principal of a grammar school. A strong advocate for equal rights and pay for women, she convinced the school board that she should be paid the same salary as a man.

In 1884, a local paper was founded and she became editor-in-chief. She named the paper The Independent. Five years later, she bought the business, which encompassed both the newspaper and a job-printing shop. She used the paper to champion equal rights for women and labor rights.

Loud served on the school board for three years (1887–90) and addressed the town meetings on local issues. She represented the Knights of Labor at the 1888 International Council of Women meeting in Washington, D.C.

Loud died in Rockland on April 6, 1911, at the age of 66.

== Family ==
Loud lived on her mother's farm. In 1891, she adopted two grand-nephews, Ralph and Carl Powers.
