= Lower Union Street Historic District =

Historic district in Massachusetts, United States

- U.S. National Register of Historic Places
- U.S. Historic district
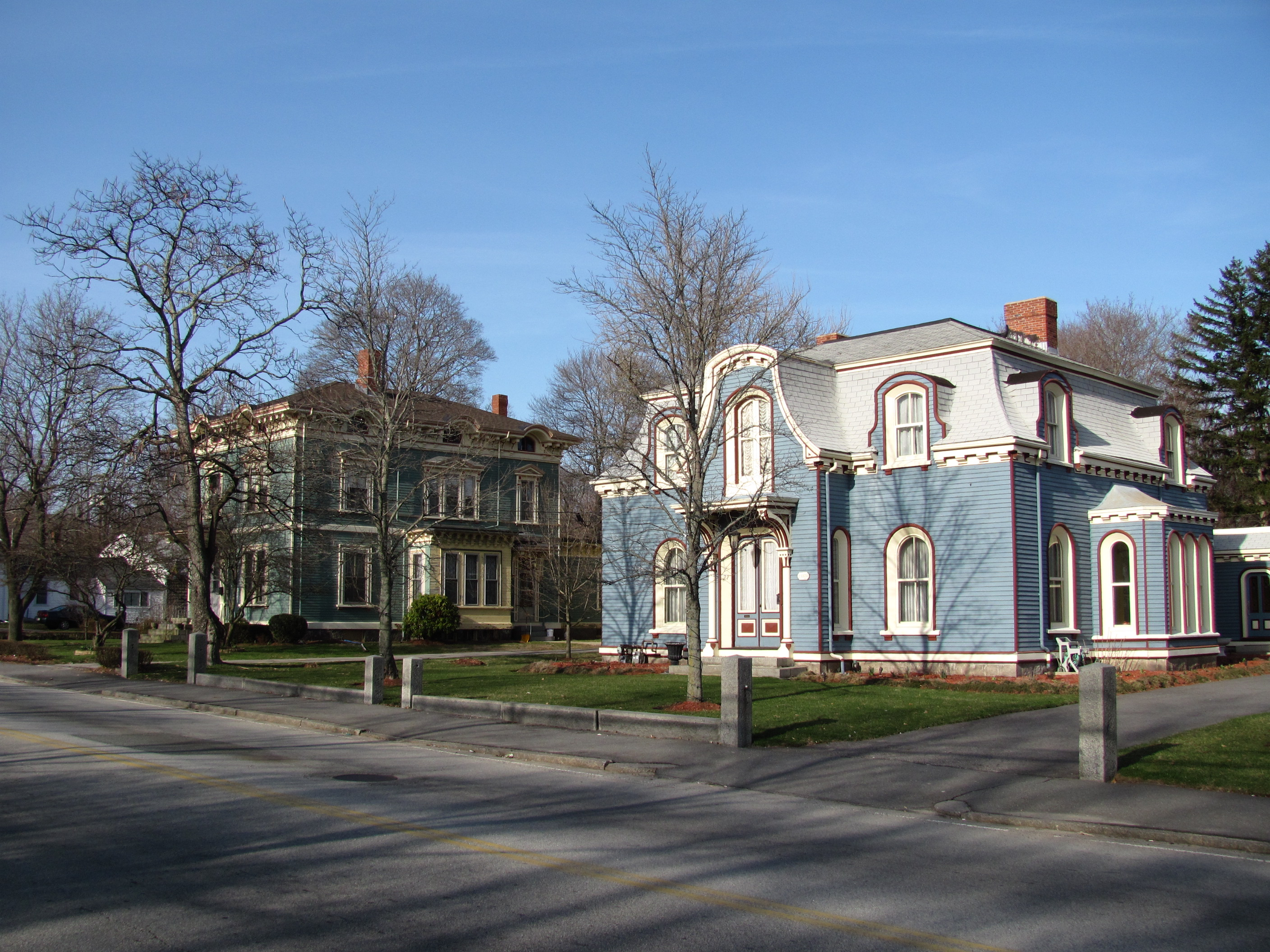
- Union Street near Market Street

- Location within Massachusetts Location within the United States
- Location: Rockland, Massachusetts
- Coordinates: 42°7′38″N 70°54′57″W
- Architectural style: Greek Revival, Late Victorian, Federal
- NRHP reference No.: 89000219
- Added to NRHP: April 7, 1989

The Lower Union Street Historic District is a historic district on Union St. from Water St. to Market St. in Rockland, Massachusetts. It is a predominantly residential area, encompassing an area of well-preserved houses from the late 18th to early 20th centuries. The oldest houses are those of David Lane (64 Union Street) and Deacon Reed (132 Union Street), built in 1816 and c. 1818 respectively. The Reed house is distinctive because of its brick end walls and its excellent example of a Federal style door surround, with sidelight windows and an elliptical fanlight.

The district was added to the National Register of Historic Places in 1989.

== See also ==
- National Register of Historic Places listings in Plymouth County, Massachusetts
