= Eldredge Public Library =

- U.S. National Register of Historic Places
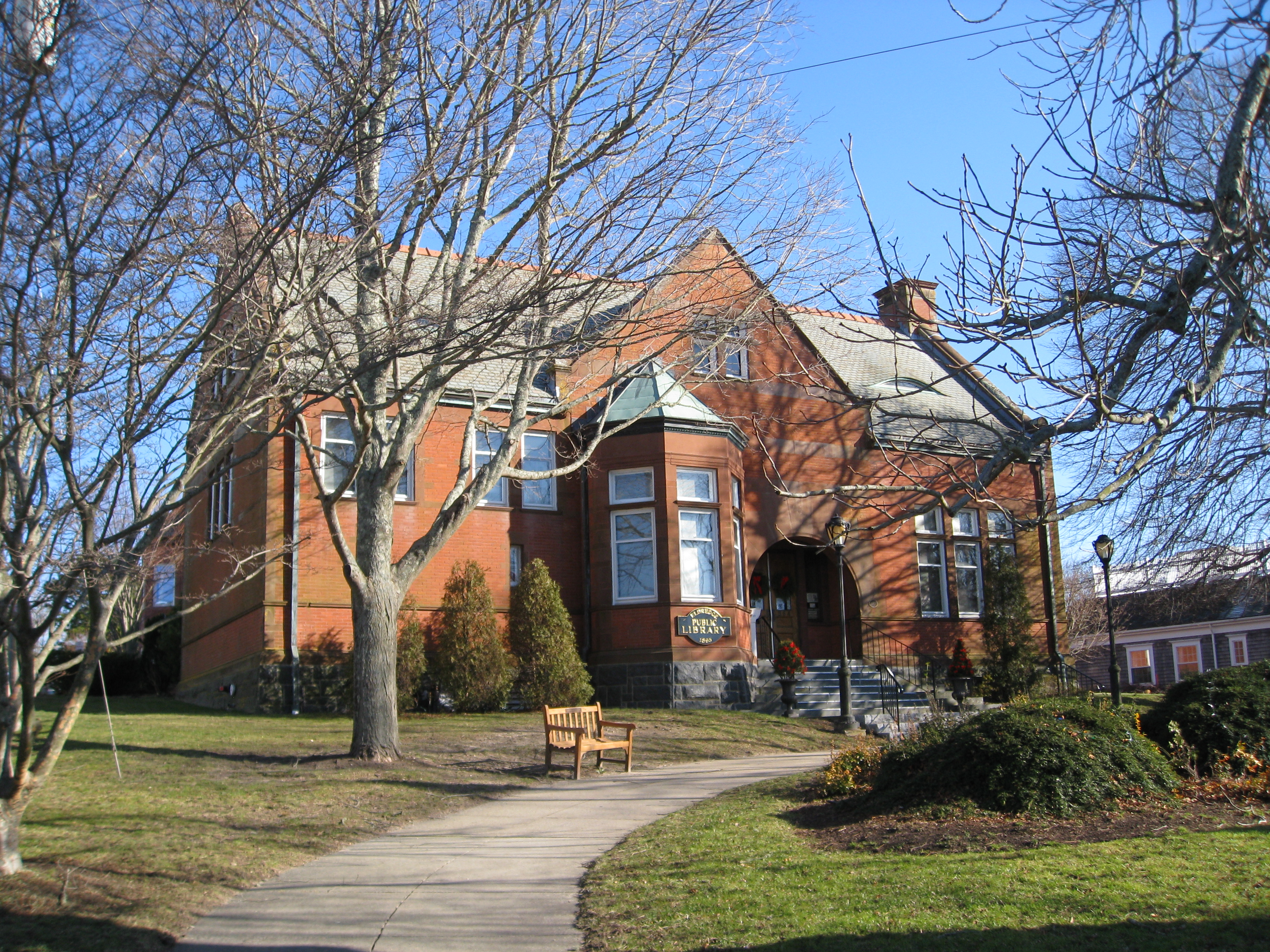

- Location within Cape Cod Location within Massachusetts Location within the United States
- Location: Chatham, Massachusetts
- Coordinates: 41°40′52″N 69°57′32″W
- Built: 1896
- Architect: Albion M. Marble
- Architectural style: Romanesque
- NRHP reference No.: 92000430
- Added to NRHP: April 28, 1992

Eldredge Public Library is the public library of Chatham, Massachusetts. It is located at 564 Main Street, in a National Register-listed Romanesque Revival building donated by Chatham native Marcellus Eldredge. It was designed by Boston architect A. M. Marble.

== Architecture and history ==
The library is set at the southeast corner of Main Street and Library Lane in Chatham's central business district. It is a 1-1/2 story brick and stone structure, with a slate roof and a granite foundation. Its Romanesque Revival features include parapeted end walls, eyebrow dormers, and brownstone trim, including beltcourses, window trim, and corner quoining. A 1968 addition, extending the building to the rear, was rebuilt in the early 1990s to more sympathetically resemble the original building. The interior has floors of marble and oak, and lavish oak woodwork.

The Chatham library has its origins in a small library in South Chatham in 1875, and a library and reading room in Chatham village in 1887. Marcellus Eldredge, a Chatham native who made a fortune as a brewer in Portsmouth, New Hampshire, offered the town a new library building, which was constructed in 1896 at a cost of $30,000. The designer was the otherwise little-known Boston architect A. M. Marble. Eldredge also established a $20,000 endowment to maintain the library. This building was enlarged in 1968 to a design by Alger and Gunn of Hyannis, and again in 1991-92 by A. Anthony Tappe of Tappé Architects in Boston.

The library was listed on the National Register of Historic Places for its architectural significance in 1992. It is the only major Romanesque Revival work in the town, and one of very few in Barnstable County.

== See also ==
- National Register of Historic Places listings in Barnstable County, Massachusetts
