= Rockland, Massachusetts =

- Town
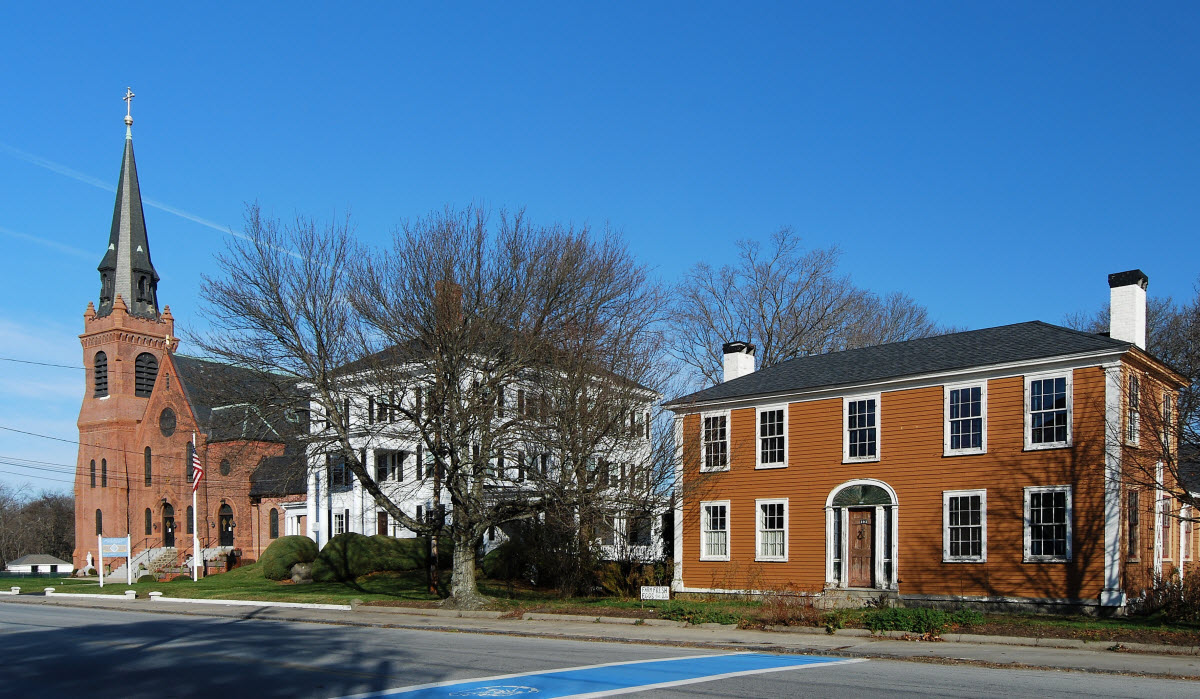
- Union Street, Rockland

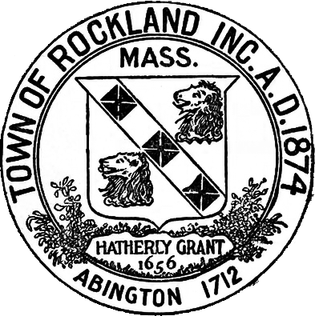
- Seal

- Location in Plymouth County in Massachusetts
- Coordinates: 42°07′50″N 70°55′00″W
- Country: United States
- State: Massachusetts
- County: Plymouth
- Settled: 1673
- Incorporated: 1874

Government
  - Type: Open town meeting

Area
  - Total: 10.1 sq mi (26.2 km^{2})
  - Land: 10.0 sq mi (26.0 km^{2})
  - Water: 0.077 sq mi (0.2 km^{2})
- Elevation: 141 ft (43 m)

Population (2020)
  - Total: 17,803
  - Density: 1,773/sq mi (684.7/km^{2})
- Time zone: UTC−5 (Eastern)
  - Summer (DST): UTC−4 (Eastern)
- ZIP Code: 02370
- Area code: 339/781
- FIPS code: 25-57775
- GNIS feature ID: 0618351
- Website: www.rockland-ma.gov

Rockland is a town in Plymouth County, Massachusetts, United States. The population was 17,803 at the 2020 census. As of December 31, 2009, there were 11,809 registered voters in the community.

== History ==
Rockland was a part of territory given to one Timothy Hatherly in a land grant, later known as the Hatherly Grant, in 1654. It was then populated by European settlers as a northeastern region of the neighboring town Abington in 1673. The town separated and incorporated as Rockland on March 9, 1874. It is named for the town's rocky nature, which was better suited for mills and industry than for farming. During King Philip's War, the town was the site of an encampment during his raids on the town of Scituate.

Before the Civil War, Rockland was known as a major lumber producer for the shipyards in Hanover and Scituate. The town industry boomed during the 19th century and during the civil war due to its shoe factories, its timber export, and its sawmills but production declined after the Great Depression. Rockland experienced new business growth in the decades after World War II with suburban development along the Routes 123 & 139.

During the twentieth century, the town was the site of a portion of the landing strips of the South Weymouth Naval Air Station. The airstrip closed in 1996 as a part of the fourth round of closures under the Base Realignment and Closure Act.

In recent years, a growing number of artists have moved into the community, attracted by former factory buildings as a place to work and meet. These buildings are not designated for artist use as they are just commercial and storage spaces but they are popularly used by creatives. Buildings include the E.T. Wright Building and the Sandpaper Factory. There was once a third artist community known as the Codman Building, formerly the Emerson Shoe Company, but it was rezoned as residential in 2007 allowing developers to displace 30 to 40 artists in the community and build the luxury apartment building known as the Emerson Shoe Lofts. The building is the largest wood structure in Rockland and is on the national register of historic places.

== Geography ==
According to the United States Census Bureau, the town has a total area of 10.1 square miles (26 km^{2}), of which 10.0 square miles (26 km^{2}) is land and 0.1 square miles (0.26 km^{2}), or 0.79%, is water. Rockland ranks 307th out of 351 communities in the Commonwealth. Rockland is bordered by Weymouth to the northwest, Hingham to the northeast, Norwell to the northeast, Hanover to the east, Hanson to the south, Whitman to the southwest, and Abington to the west. Rockland is 8 miles (13 km) northeast of Brockton and 22 miles (35 km) south of Boston.

Rockland, as its name suggests, is dominated by rocky lands. There are several ponds throughout the town, including Accord Pond at the junction with Hingham and Norwell, and Studleys Pond (known to local residents as Reeds Pond) just south of Rockland Center, can be seen along Market Street. There are several brooks throughout town, one of which is sourced at the Abington-Rockland Reservoir near the northwest corner of town. Beech Hill lies at the south of town, and Wyman Fields lies to the north of it. There are several parks throughout the town, as well as a small town forest just south of the Naval Air Station.

A short stretch (2/3 of a mile long) of Massachusetts Route 3 crosses the northeast corner of town, granting access to Route 228, which terminates just south of the highway. Route 123 and Route 139 pass from west to east just south of the center of town, running coextensively for roughly 2/3 of a mile.

A spur of the Old Colony rail line formerly ran through the town; that line is now abandoned. The Old Colony Line does, however, pass through neighboring Weymouth, Abington and Whitman, as part of the Kingston-Route 3 line of the MBTA's commuter rail. There are stops in South Weymouth (alongside the Naval Air Station) and Abington (just south of Route 123), not far from the town line. There is no commercial air service in town; nearby national and international flights are available at Logan International Airport in Boston, or T. F. Green Airport in Rhode Island.

== Demographics ==
Historical population
Year	Pop.	±%
1880	4,553	—
1890	5,213	+14.5%
1900	5,327	+2.2%
1910	6,928	+30.1%
1920	7,544	+8.9%
1930	7,524	−0.3%
1940	8,087	+7.5%
1950	8,960	+10.8%
1960	13,119	+46.4%
1970	15,674	+19.5%
1980	15,695	+0.1%
1990	16,123	+2.7%
2000	17,670	+9.6%
2010	17,489	−1.0%
2020	17,803	+1.8%
2024*	17,708	−0.5%
* = population estimate. Source: United States Census records and Population Estimates Program data.

As of the census of 2000, there were 17,670 people, 6,539 households, and 4,583 families residing in the town. The population density was 1,763.1 inhabitants per square mile (680.7/km^{2}). There were 6,649 housing units at an average density of 663.4 per square mile (256.1/km^{2}). The racial makeup of the town was 90.81% White, 5.71% African American, 0.15% Native American, 1.08% Asian, 0.79% from other races, and 1.47% from two or more races. Hispanic or Latino of any race were 1.02% of the population.

There were over 9,000 households, out of which 34.2% had children under the age of 18 living in them, 52.7% were married couples living together, 13.2% had a female householder with no husband present, and 29.9% were non-families. 24.9% of all households were made up of individuals, and 9.8% had someone living alone who was 65 years of age or older. The average household size was 2.67 and the average family size was 3.23.

In the town, the population was spread out, with 26.5% under the age of 18, 6.8% from 18 to 24, 32.0% from 25 to 44, 21.8% from 45 to 64, and 12.9% who were 65 years of age or older. The median age was 36 years. For every 100 females, there were 91.8 males. For every 100 females age 18 and over, there were 85.9 males.

The median income for a household in the town was $50,613, and the median income for a family was $60,088. Males had a median income of $41,361 versus $31,907 for females. The per capita income for the town was $23,068. About 6.1% of families and 6.8% of the population were below the poverty line, including 9.2% of those under age 18 and 6.2% of those age 65 or over.

Statistically, Rockland is the 103rd most populous community in the Commonwealth, just below the state average. Rockland is the 62nd most densely populated community in the Commonwealth, and the fourth most densely populated in Plymouth County.

== Government ==
On the national level, Rockland is a part of Massachusetts's 10th congressional district, and is represented by Bill Keating. The state's senior (Class I) member of the United States Senate, elected in 2012, is Elizabeth Warren. The state's junior member, elected in a special election following the appointment of John Kerry to United States Secretary of State, is Ed Markey.

On the state level, Rockland is represented in the Massachusetts House of Representatives as a part of the Fifth Plymouth district, which includes the towns of Hanover and Norwell. The town is represented in the Massachusetts Senate as a part of the Norfolk and Plymouth District, which includes Abington, Holbrook, Quincy, and part of Braintree. The town is patrolled by the First (Norwell) Barracks of Troop D of the Massachusetts State Police.

The town has its own police and fire department; the police department is located near the eastern junction of Routes 123 and 139 and the fire department is located along Union Street, the town's main street. The fire department also has its own ambulance service, which brings emergency cases to South Shore Hospital in Weymouth or Brockton Hospital in Brockton. The Rockland Memorial Library is a member of the Old Colony Library Network (OCLN) and the Southeastern Massachusetts Library System (SEMLS).

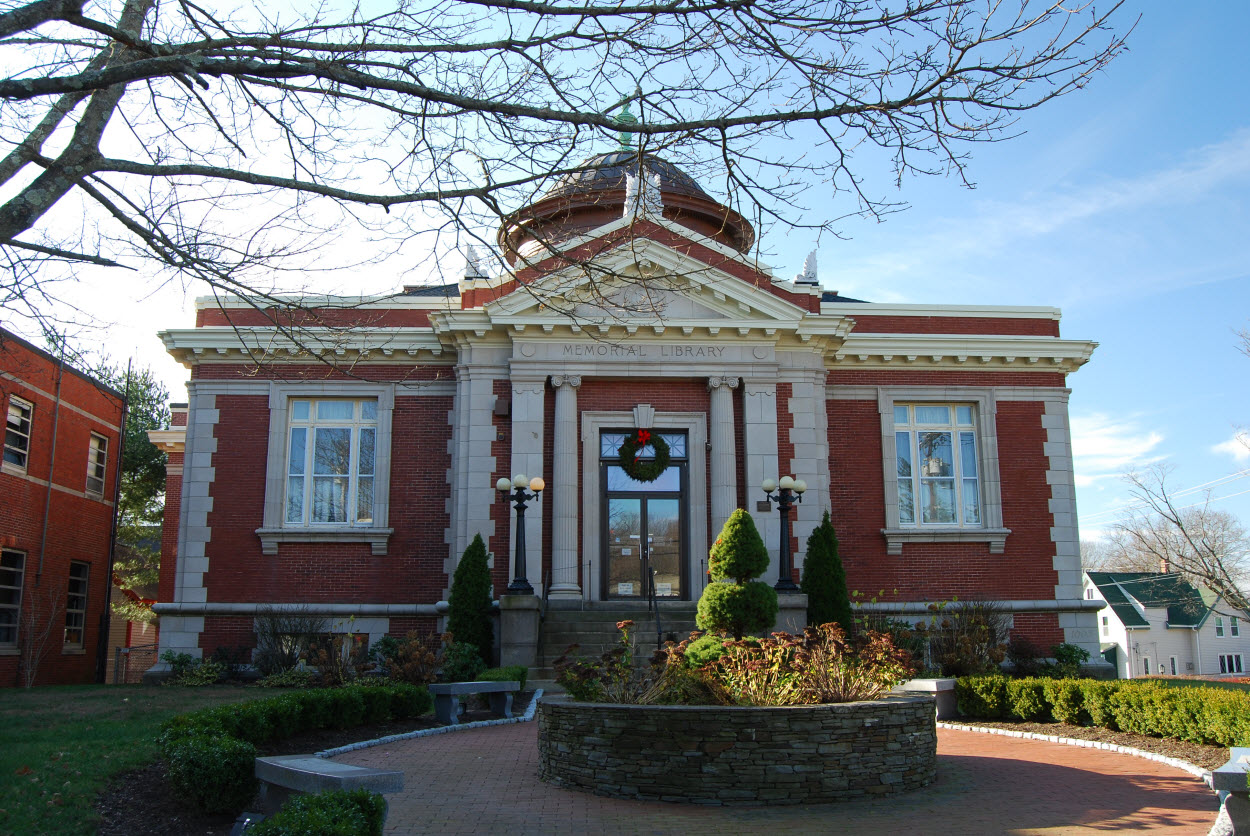
Rockland Memorial Library

Rockland is governed by an open town meeting form of government. Its board of selectmen has five elected seats, currently filled by:

- Michael O'Loughlin 2023 (Chairman)
- Tiffanie Needham, 2024
- Larry Ryan, 2022
- Kara Nyman, 2023 (Vice-Chairman)
- Richard Penney, 2022

Voter Registration and Party Enrollment as of August 24, 2024
Party	Number of Voters	Percentage
Democratic	2,518	19.05%
Republican	1,249	9.44%
Unaffiliated	9,280	70.21%
Libertarian	44	.03%
Total	13,217	100%

== Education ==
Rockland operates its own school system for the town's approximately 2,500 students. There are two elementary schools (Phelps and R. Stewart Esten) which serve students from kindergarten to fourth grade. The Phelps Elementary school is new construction, completed in 2022, replacing both Memorial Park and Jefferson elementary schools. Both Memorial Park and Jefferson schools were demolished in 2022 and 2023, respectively.

The John W. Rogers Middle School is located adjacent to Memorial Park, in a new facility completed in 2012 and connected to the high school. It serves fifth through eighth grades. A newly renovated Rockland Senior High School serves ninth through twelfth grade students. In June 2021, Rockland Senior High School was placed into a state program for schools or districts that disproportionately suspend nonwhite students or students with disabilities.

Rockland High's athletics teams are known as the Bulldogs (sometimes just 'Dogs), and their colors are navy blue and white. They compete in the South Shore League and their rival is Abington. The Bulldogs have a strong basketball tradition, with their most recent state championships in 2004 (boys) and 2000 (girls). The football team last won a Super Bowl in 2021 by defeating Abington, 23–13, at Gillette Stadium.

In addition to the high school, students may attend South Shore Vocational Technical High School in Hanover free of charge. The town also has a private school, Calvary Chapel Academy. Calvary Chapel Academy is a Christian school serving from kindergarten through twelfth grade.

Children living in Rockland are also eligible to attend South Shore Charter Public School. Located in neighboring Norwell, the school offers entrance to neighboring towns on the South Shore.

Many students and their families also choose to attend private high schools in the area, including Cardinal Spellman High School in Brockton, Notre Dame Academy in Hingham, Archbishop Williams High School in Braintree, Boston College High School in Boston, Xaverian Brothers High School in Westwood, and more.

== Economy ==
The town serves as the headquarters for several major companies:

- The US headquarters of the biotechnology and pharmaceutical company EMD Serono
- Rockland Trust Company, the largest publicly traded commercial bank headquartered in Massachusetts, with over 1,000 employees

=== Revitalization ===
Town officials and citizens have moved forward with efforts to revitalize Rockland Center. The stretch of Union Street is plentiful with mix-use buildings that reflect the heritage of Rockland Center's past vibrancy.

A comprehensive study conducted by BSC Group and McCabe Enterprises made recommendations to guide the Center's redevelopment while retaining historic aspects.

New sidewalks and crossing areas, paid for with a federal Community Development Block Grant, were installed in 2010.

Selectmen contracted the Iron Horse Preservation Society to remove the section of the Old Colony rail line that ran through town. Since the rails were removed, the line has been used for light recreation activities such as walking and bike riding.

== Media ==
=== Newspapers ===
In 1884, a local paper was founded and Hulda Barker Loud took the position of editor-in-chief, naming the paper The Independent.

Today, the town shares a weekly newspaper with neighboring Abington, The Rockland Standard. The Patriot Ledger and The Brockton Enterprise serve the greater South Shore area.

=== Radio and television ===
WRPS (88.3 FM) is a radio station owned by Rockland High School. The station is operated by the students and staff of the school. In addition, the studio offers two public access cable channels.

== Sites of interest ==
=== Historic buildings ===
Lower Union Street Historic District runs down southern Union Street from East Water to Market Streets. In addition, there are several buildings on the National Register of Historic Places:

- Grand Army of the Republic Hall, built in 1899
- Mckinley School, built in 1909 as Rockland High School and now the Rockland Community Center
- Phoenix Building, built in 1929
- Rockland Almshouse, built in 1876, now the home of the North River Collaborative educational organization
- Rockland Memorial Library, built in 1903
- Rockland Trust Company building, built in 1917
- ET Wright Building, built in 1880
- Sandpaper Factory, built in 1890
- Holy Family Church, built in 1883

== Notable people ==
- Brian Duffy (born 1953), astronaut
- George V. Higgins (1939–1999), author
- PJ Ladd (born 1983), professional skateboarder
- Hulda Barker Loud (1844–1911), newspaper editor
- Frederic O. MacCartney (1864–1903), socialist politician
- Maria Louise Pool (1841–1898), author
- Jonathan Togo (born 1977), actor
- Megan Khang (born 1997), professional golfer
