= Rockland High School (1909) =

- U.S. National Register of Historic Places
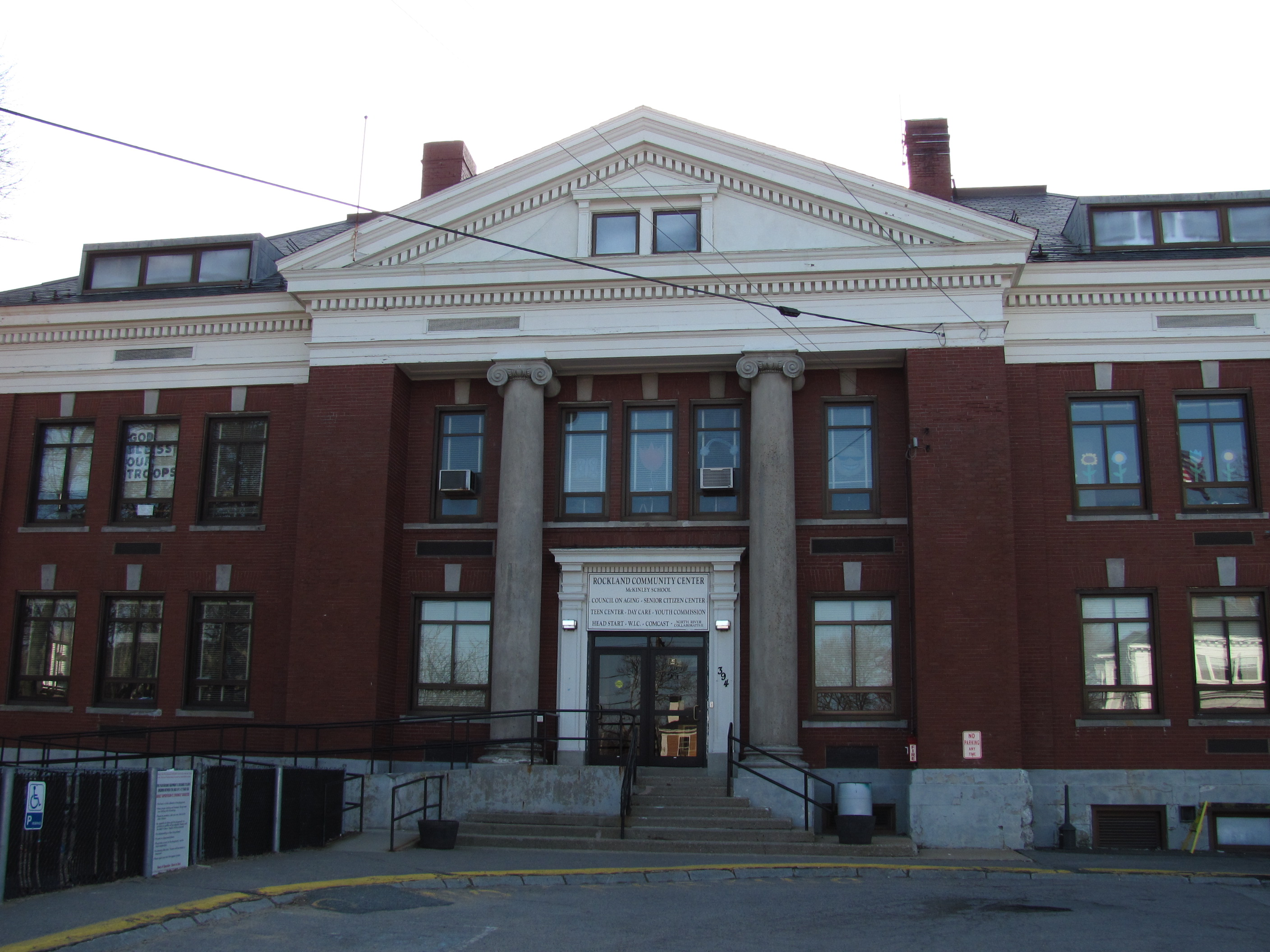
- Rockland High School

- Location within Massachusetts Location within the United States
- Location: Rockland, Massachusetts
- Coordinates: 42°8′56″N 70°55′5″W
- Built: 1909
- Architect: Cooper & Bailey; Frank Irving Cooper
- Architectural style: Colonial Revival
- NRHP reference No.: 89000217
- Added to NRHP: March 23, 1989

Rockland High School is a historic former high school building located at 349 Union Street in Rockland, Massachusetts. It was built in 1909 and served as the town's second high school until 1928. It was later converted to lower grades and was known as McKinley School. It was added to the National Register of Historic Places in 1989.

The building is now a community center - housing day care, pre-school and meeting spaces for Girl Scouts. The building housed Rockland's senior center prior to the construction of a new senior center on Plain Street.

== See also ==
- National Register of Historic Places listings in Plymouth County, Massachusetts
- Rockland Senior High School (built 1957, the town's current high school)
