= Satuit =

Native American Wampanoag word

Satuit is a Native American Wampanoag word meaning "cold brook" (salt, cold stream?). The town of Scituate, a seacoast town in Plymouth County, Massachusetts, United States, on the South Shore, midway between Boston and Plymouth, derived its name from this word. Satuit changed name to Scituate in 1640. The Wampanoag Indians inhabited the area and were referring to a brook by that name which runs into the inner harbour at what is now called Scituate. Seteat was an alternative Indian spelling of Satuit. Satuit Brook still flows into the head of the harbour, at the southern end of Front Street. There is a locating marker on the south side of the road.

More recently Satuit has been incorporated in the name of several businesses located in the greater Boston area.

- Satuit Technologies, Inc. A software company that specialises in Customer Relationship Management (CRM) software for the investment management industry, whose headquarters are in Braintree, Massachusetts.
- Satuit Tavern in Scituate.
