= Norwell Village Area Historic District =

Historic district in Massachusetts, United States

- U.S. National Register of Historic Places
- U.S. Historic district
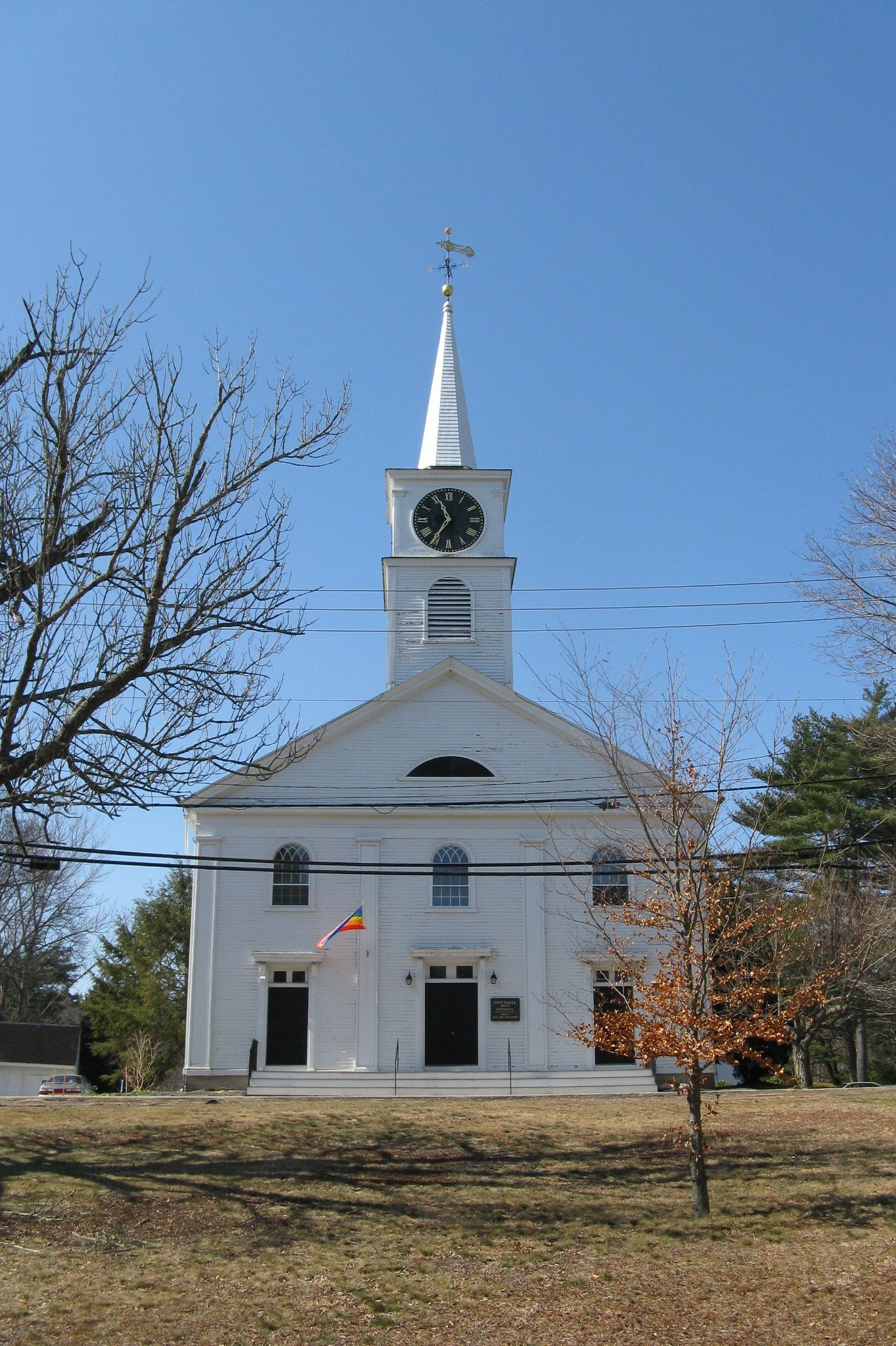
- First Parish Norwell

- Location within Massachusetts Location within the United States
- Location: Norwell, Massachusetts
- Coordinates: 42°9′41″N 70°47′28″W
- Architect: Multiple
- Architectural style: Mid 19th Century Revival, Late 19th And 20th Century Revivals, Federal
- NRHP reference No.: 82004432
- Added to NRHP: June 2, 1982

The Norwell Village Area Historic District encompasses the village center of Norwell, Massachusetts. It is centered on the town common, first laid out in the 1640s, around which a number of public buildings are located, and radiates away along Main, Central, West, River, and Dover Streets. There are 34 buildings in the district, predominantly residential and representing a cross-section of architectural styles from the 18th to the early 20th centuries. Prominent buildings include the 1830 First Parish Church, the 1874 Italianate-style James Library building, and the 1934 Colonial Revival Cushing Memorial Town Hall.

The district was added to the National Register of Historic Places in 1982.

== See also ==
- National Register of Historic Places listings in Plymouth County, Massachusetts
