= Rockland Senior High School =

Coordinates: 42.1285°N 70.9177°W

- 52 MacKinlay Way, Rockland, MA 02370; United States

Information
- Type: Public; High school Open enrollment
- Established: 1892
- School district: Rockland Public Schools
- Principal: Cheryl Schipper
- Grades: 9–12
- Student to teacher ratio: 11.99
- Colors: Navy Blue, Columbia Blue & White
- Team name: Bulldogs
- Newspaper: The Veritas
- Website: Rockland Senior High School

Rockland Senior High School is public high school located at 52 MacKinlay Way in Rockland, Massachusetts, United States. The current high school building opened in 1957. Between 2010 and 2012, it underwent an $86 million renovation project.

== History ==
Rockland's first high school was located in the Lincoln School, built in 1892 at the corner of Howard and Church Streets. This building became a grammar school with the opening of the new Rockland High School in 1909.

In 1928, a new, larger senior-junior high school was built at 100 Taunton Avenue. It was designed by J. Williams Beal, Sons, who also designed the Rockland Post Office and the Dyer Memorial Library in Abington. The current high school, also designed by J. Williams Beal, Sons, opened in 1957. The first graduating class was in 1959. In June 2021, Rockland Senior High School was placed into a state program for schools or districts that disproportionately suspend nonwhite students or students with disabilities.

== Athletics ==
=== Basketball ===
- State Champions - 1972, 2004
- 29x League Champions- 1963, 1970, 1971, 1972, 1974, 1975, 1979, 1981, 1982, 1984, 1985, 1990, 1991, 1997, 1998, 1999, 2000, 2001, 2002, 2003, 2004, 2006, 2007, 2008, 2010, 2013, 2016, 2017, 2018

The Rockland High School basketball culture is immense, cultivated by the Bulldogs many great successes over the years. They are currently coached by Fred Damon, who has held the title since the 2004-05 season. The team has qualified for the MIAA state tournament 51 out of the last 55 seasons, one of the top qualification records across all divisions in Massachusetts. The school most recently won the state tournament in 2004, under Head Coach Bob Fisher. Finishing the regular season with a 24-2 record, Rockland defeated Cardinal Spellman in the South Sectional Semi-Finals, one of the only teams to defeat them in the regular season. Advancing to the South Sectional Finals, Rockland knocked off their longtime rival, the Norwell Clippers, in dramatic fashion to move onto the State Semi-Finals at the then Fleet Center. The Bulldogs upset Lynn Tech in the Semi-Finals, and, led by Captain Joe Coppens' 31 points, beat New Leadership High School, 63-60, in the State Championship game. The school also won the state tournament for Division II in 1972. Between 2007 and 2018, the Bulldogs only missed qualification for the State Tournament in the 2008–2009 season, and multiple times made deep runs, including Sweet Sixteen appearances in 2013 and 2016. Beginning in the 2010–11 season, the Bulldogs withdrew from the Patriot League and began competing in the South Shore League, a league that is more tailored to the smaller school size and relative distance of the schools. In 2013, Rockland player Tyler Gibson was awarded the Massachusetts Gatorade Player of the Year. Since 2020, the team has struggled to maintain the high expectations that have been fostered over the last two decades of success; in the 2021–22 season, the program failed to qualify for the tournament with a record of 7–13. In the 2022–23 year, the Bulldogs qualified for the tournament by defeating Watertown in a tough road game preliminary round, but lost to the eventual state champions Archbishop Williams in a highly competitive game, 64-57. However, in the 2023–24 season, the Bulldogs struggled again, with a 6–14 record and a second season in three years of failing to qualify for the MIAA Division IV tournament.

=== Football ===
- State Champions - 1992, 1998, 2000, 2021

=== Hockey ===
The Rockland hockey team made a run to the South Sectional Finals in 2011-12, posting a regular season record of 14–5–1 while knocking off Blue Hills Regional and Somerset-Berkley in the first two round respectively. In the South semifinals, Rockland matched up against the No. 2 team in the state and No. 1 in the south: Medfield. The Warriors had the best goalie in the state by far, stopping 180 shots out of 202 taken up to that point. Serious underdogs, Rockland upset Medfield, 6–2, en route to the finals, where the scrappy Bulldogs fell to Medway High, 4–1.

== Notable alumni ==
- Brianna LaPaglia (class of 2017) – influencer, podcaster, and Sports Illustrated Swimsuit model
