= Luzerne County Manager =

County Manager of Luzerne County, Pennsylvania
- Incumbent; Romilda P. Crocamo since May 2023
- Reports to: Luzerne County Council
- Appointer: Luzerne County Council
- Inaugural holder: Robert Lawton
- Formation: 2012
- Salary: $181,501 (2026)

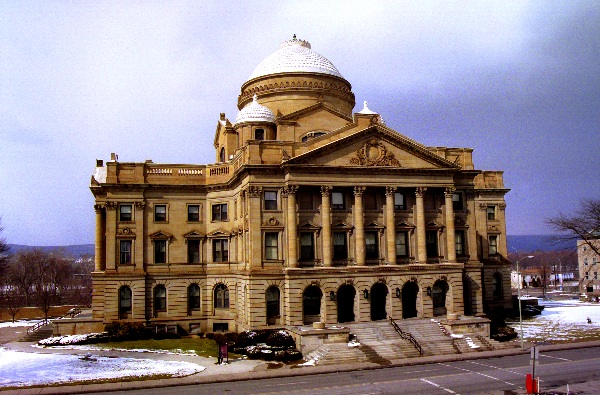
The Luzerne County Courthouse in Wilkes-Barre, Pennsylvania

The Luzerne County Manager heads the executive branch of the Luzerne County government. The manager directs the county's organizational, management, and administrative operations and activities. The manager is appointed by, and serves at the pleasure of, the Luzerne County Council. The current manager is Romilda Crocamo.

== History ==
Luzerne County voters rejected home rule proposals in the past (once in 1974 and again in 2003). However, from 2008 to 2010, corruption plagued the county government. Three county judges, a county commissioner, a clerk of courts, a deputy chief clerk, and a director of human resources faced criminal charges. These events persuaded the voters of Luzerne County to adopt a new form of government. On Tuesday, November 2, 2010, a home rule charter was adopted by a margin of 51,413 to 41,639.

On Monday, January 2, 2012, the previous government (the board of county commissioners) was abolished and replaced with the new form of government (council–manager government). The first members of the Luzerne County Council were sworn in that same day. The assembly consists of eleven elected members. They appoint and work alongside a full-time manager. The manager oversees the county's day-to-day operations. In the beginning, Tom Pribula served as the interim county manager. Several weeks later, the council appointed the first county manager (Robert Lawton).

== Serving "at the pleasure of county council" ==
According to the home rule charter, the manager “shall serve at the pleasure of county council.” In other words, the council has the power to appoint and remove the manager. Each ordinance, resolution, and policy established by county council should be faithfully executed by the county manager. The manager may make recommendations to the council, but does not have the authority to vote on or veto any legislation originating from the assembly.

After serving for only five months as county manager, Randy Roberston resigned in November 2022. He later stated, “I don’t think there’s any way in the world I could have anticipated how challenging the small cadre of council members would make the [manager's] job.”

== List of county managers ==
| # | Manager's name | Term of office | Notes |
|---|---|---|---|
| – | Tom Pribula | 2012 | He served as the interim county manager until Robert Lawton assumed office. |
| 1 | Robert Lawton | 2012–2015 | In early 2012, the Luzerne County Council officially appointed Lawton as the first county manager. The position was left vacant after he resigned in December 2015. |
| 2 | David Pedri | 2016–2021 | In early 2016, he was named acting manager. In May, the Luzerne County Council officially appointed Pedri as the second county manager (with a vote of 7–4). He resigned in July 2021. |
| – | Romilda Crocamo | 2021–2022 | Crocamo was appointed by council acting county manager with a vote of 6–5. She assumed the role after Pedri resigned in July 2021. Crocamo resigned in May 2022 after council appointed Randy Robertson manager. |
| – | Brian Swetz | 2022 | After Crocamo resigned, council appointed Swetz to serve as acting county manager for about three weeks until Robertson assumed the role. |
| 3 | Randy Robertson | 2022 | Robertson became county manager in June 2022. He resigned in November. |
| – | Brian Swetz | 2022–2023 | Swetz was appointed acting county manager following Robertson's resignation. He remained in office until council appointed Crocamo as the new manager in May 2023. |
| 4 | Romilda Crocamo | 2023–present | In May 2023, council officially appointed Crocamo as the fourth county manager (with a vote of 10–1). She assumed office that same month. |
