= Luzerne County Council elections =

American elections

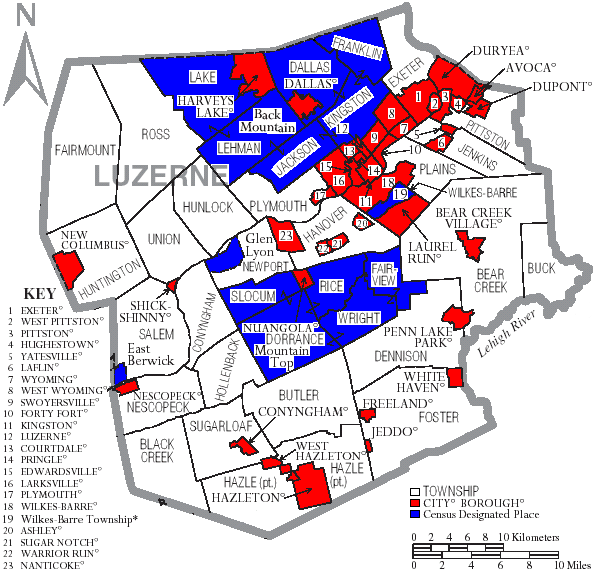
A map of municipalities in Luzerne County. Each council member represents the entire county.

The Luzerne County Council is elected by the voters of the county. The governing body consists of eleven members. Nearly half the council is up for election every two years. It rotates between five and six seats. Each council member is elected at-large (to a four-year term). Councilors may serve no more than three consecutive terms.

In the May primary, the major political parties (Democratic and Republican) select their top candidates for the general election. For example, those who place in the top five or six become the nominees of their party. Third party (or independent) candidates may also join the race. In the November general election, all political parties/candidates square off on the same ballot. Those who place in the top five or six will be elected or re-elected to council.

== Background ==
On Tuesday, November 2, 2010, Luzerne County adopted a home rule charter by a margin of 51,413 to 41,639. The following year (in 2011), the first election for the new government was held. On Monday, January 2, 2012, the previous government (the board of county commissioners) was abolished and replaced with the new form of government (council–manager government). The first members of the Luzerne County Council were sworn in that same day. The council chair, who is appointed by his or her fellow council members, is both the highest-ranking officer on the council and the head of county government for ceremonial purposes. The first council chair was Jim Bobeck.

== 2011 county council election ==
The first primary elections for Luzerne County Council were held on Tuesday, May 17, 2011. Eleven Democratic nominees and eleven Republican nominees were selected in the primary elections.

2011 Luzerne County Council Democratic primary election
Party	Candidate	Votes	%
Democratic	Stephen A. Urban	12,170	5.24
Democratic	Linda McClosky Houck	11,019	4.74
Democratic	Jim Bobeck	10,548	4.54
Democratic	Edward A. Brominski	10,325	4.44
Democratic	Jane Walsh-Waitkus	9,507	4.09
Democratic	Eileen M. Sorokas	9,377	4.04
Democratic	Salvatore Licata	8,992	3.87
Democratic	Tim McGinley	8,975	3.86
Democratic	Michelle Bednar	8,840	3.81
Democratic	M. Theresa Morcavage	8,130	3.50
Democratic	Elaine Maddon Curry	7,884	3.39
Democratic	John Adonizio	7,608	3.27
Democratic	Michael G. Collins	7,532	3.24
Democratic	Brian K. Overman	7,192	3.10
Democratic	Frank Sorokach	6,957	2.99
Democratic	John Livingston	6,879	2.96
Democratic	Joseph M. Padavan	6,835	2.94
Democratic	John T. Nadolny	6,743	2.90
Democratic	Michael A. Chrobak	6,445	2.77
Democratic	Wil Toole	6,164	2.65
Democratic	Michael McGlynn	5,765	2.48
Democratic	Bruce J. Simpson	5,581	2.40
Democratic	Fred Stuccio	5,550	2.39
Democratic	Wayne Wolfe	5,278	2.27
Democratic	Harry W. Skene	5,257	2.26
Democratic	Stanley Knick Jr.	5,083	2.19
Democratic	Thomas F. Rovinski	4,986	2.15
Democratic	Thomas Mark Rome	4,885	2.10
Democratic	Casey Evans	4,679	2.01
Democratic	Mario J. Fiorucci Jr.	4,571	1.97
Democratic	Michael S. Giamber	4,190	1.80
Democratic	Thomas W. Ksiezopolski Sr.	4,174	1.80
Democratic	Robert G. Webb	3,259	1.40
Write-in		944	0.41
Total votes		232,324	100.00

2011 Luzerne County Council Republican primary election
Party	Candidate	Votes	%
Republican	Stephen J. Urban	8,877	8.02
Republican	Rick Morelli	8,774	7.93
Republican	Kathleen M. Dobash	8,089	7.31
Republican	John Ruckno	7,886	7.13
Republican	Harry Haas	7,760	7.02
Republican	Blythe H. Evans III	7.089	6.41
Republican	William Bell James	6,757	6.11
Republican	Eugene L. Kelleher	6,677	6.04
Republican	Gina Nevenglosky	6,610	5.98
Republican	Joyce Dombroski-Gebhardt	6,594	5.96
Republican	Michael Cabell	6,591	5.96
Republican	Linda J. Urban	6,356	5.75
Republican	William McIntosh	6,195	5.60
Republican	Moderno Butch Rossi	5,947	5.38
Republican	Edward Warkevicz	5,753	5.20
Republican	Joseph A. Gorko	3,675	3.32
Write-in		988	0.89
Total votes		110,618	100.00

The first general election for Luzerne County Council was held on Tuesday, November 8, 2011. The first eleven members were elected, consisting of six Democrats, four Republicans, and one independent. The first councilmen were Rick Morelli, Stephen A. Urban, Jim Bobeck, Stephen J. Urban, Tim McGinley, Edward Brominski, Harry Haas, Rick Williams, Elaine Maddon Curry, Linda McClosky Houck, and Eugene Kelleher. The top six vote getters in the general election were given four-year terms. The rest were given two-year terms. The newly elected government was sworn in on January 2, 2012.

Seats after the election
Party	Number of seats
Democratic	6
Republican	4
Independent	1

2011 Luzerne County Council general election
Party	Candidate	Votes	%
Republican	Rick Morelli	25,026	5.25
Democratic	Stephen A. Urban	23,657	4.97
Democratic	Jim Bobeck	23,412	4.91
Republican	Stephen J. Urban	22,598	4.74
Democratic	Tim McGinley	21,654	4.54
Democratic	Edward A. Brominski	21,630	4.54
Republican	Harry Haas	21,299	4.47
Independent	Rick Williams	20,359	4.27
Democratic	Elaine Maddon Curry	19,593	4.11
Democratic	Linda McClosky Houck	19,375	4.07
Republican	Eugene L. Kelleher	18,867	3.96
Democratic	Eileen M. Sorokas	18,811	3.95
Republican	John Ruckno	18,594	3.90
Democratic	Jane Walsh-Waitkus	18,419	3.87
Republican	Kathleen M. Dobash	17,556	3.68
Democratic	Michelle Bednar	17,532	3.68
Democratic	Salvatore Licata	16,601	3.48
Republican	Blythe H. Evans III	16,261	3.41
Republican	William Bill James	15,611	3.28
Republican	Joyce Dombroski-Gebhardt	14,723	3.09
Democratic	M. Theresa Morcavage	14,299	3.00
Republican	Gina Nevenglosky	13,849	2.91
Republican	Michael Cabell	12,855	2.70
Libertarian	Michael A. Lacey	11,108	2.33
Independent	Jeremy Packard	11,095	2.33
Libertarian	Tim Mullen	10,770	2.26
American Independent	Charlie "Bible Buck" Hatchko	6,309	1.32
Libertarian	Brian R. Bergman	3,734	0.78
	Write-in	862	0.18
Total votes		476,459	100

== 2013 county council election ==
The second set of primary elections were held on Tuesday, May, 21, 2013. Five Democrats and five Republicans were nominated. Democrat Elaine Maddon Curry did not seek re-election.

2013 Luzerne County Council Democratic primary election
Party	Candidate	Votes	%
Democratic	Eileen M. Sorokas	13,360	23.02
Democratic	Linda McClosky Houck (incumbent)	12,214	21.05
Democratic	Renee Ciaruffoli Taffera	11,094	19.12
Democratic	Richard "Kick" Heffron	10,920	18.92
Democratic	Michael Giamber	9,924	17.10
Write-in		520	0.90
Total votes		58,032	100.00

2013 Luzerne County Council Republican primary election
Party	Candidate	Votes	%
Republican	Harry Haas (incumbent)	6,555	18.79
Republican	Sue Rossi	6,511	18.66
Republican	Eugene Kelleher (incumbent)	6,413	18.38
Republican	Kathy Dobash	6,295	18.04
Republican	Paul F. Defabo	4,405	12.63
Republican	Alex Milanes	4,382	12.56
Write-in		327	0.94
Total votes		34,888	100.00

The second general election was held on Tuesday, November 5, 2013. Five seats were up for election. Councilwoman Linda McClosky Houck was the top vote-getter (with 18,980 votes). Eileen Sorokas and Kathy Dobash were both newly elected to council. Eugene Kelleher was the only incumbent to lose his seat in the general election. In the end, the number of seats per political party remained the same—six Democrats, four Republicans, and one independent.

Seats after the election
Party	Number of seats
Democratic	6
Republican	4
Independent	1

2013 Luzerne County Council general election
Party	Candidate	Votes	%
Democratic	Linda McClosky Houck (incumbent)	18,980	10.18
Democratic	Eileen M. Sorokas	18,287	9.81
Republican	Kathy Dobash	17,829	9.56
Republican	Harry Haas (incumbent)	17,552	9.41
Independent	Rick Williams (incumbent)	17,226	9.24
Republican	Sue Rossi	17,147	9.20
Democratic	Richard "Kick" Heffron	16,929	9.08
Democratic	Renee Ciaruffoli Taffera	16,560	8.88
Republican	Eugene L. Kelleher (incumbent)	16,339	8.76
Democratic	Michael Giamber	15,345	8.23
Republican	Paul M. Defabo	13,586	7.29
	Write-in	688	0.37
Total votes		186,468	100

== 2015 county council election ==
The third round of primary election were held on May 19, 2015. Six Democrats and six Republicans were nominated. Democrat Jim Bobeck and Republican Rick Morelli did not seek re-election.Democrat Robert Schnee lost the Democratic nomination, but won the Republican nomination with 384 write-in votes. Former councilman Eugene Kelleher also won a Republican nomination via write-in votes.

2015 Luzerne County Council Democratic primary election
Party	Candidate	Votes	%
Democratic	Tim McGinley (incumbent)	13,385	14.50
Democratic	Jane Walsh-Waitkus	10,864	11.77
Democratic	John Gadomski	10,599	11.48
Democratic	Edward A. Brominski (incumbent)	10,509	11.39
Democratic	Stephen A. Urban (incumbent)	10,166	11.01
Democratic	Anthony J. Rostock	9,678	10.49
Democratic	Robert J. Altavilla	9,476	10.27
Democratic	Robert Schnee	8,189	8.87
Write-in		744	0.81
Total votes		92,303	100.00

2015 Luzerne County Council Republican primary election
Party	Candidate	Votes	%
Republican	Stephen J. Urban (incumbent)	7,366	25.56
Republican	Marc Dixon	7,077	24.56
Republican	Mark A. Rabo	6,245	21.67
Republican	Ray Gustave	6,189	21.48
Write-in	Gene Kelleher	448	1.55
Write-in	Robert Schnee	384	1.33
Write-in	Other write-in candidates	1,107	3.84
Total votes		28,816	100.00

The third general election was held on Tuesday, November 3, 2015. Six seats were up for election. In the November general election, Robert Schnee and Jane Walsh-Waitkus were both newly elected to council. Even though Robert Schnee won the election as a Republican, he would serve as a Democrat. Stephen J. Urban was the only incumbent to lose his seat in the general election.

Seats after the election
Party	Number of seats
Democratic	7
Republican	3
Independent	1
Note: Robert W. Schnee won the general election as a Republican, but served as a Democrat.

2015 Luzerne County Council general election
Party	Candidate	Votes	%
Democratic	Tim McGinley (incumbent)	23,892	10.37
Democratic	Edward A. Brominski (incumbent)	21,066	9.14
Democratic	Stephen A. Urban (incumbent)	20,967	9.10
Republican	Eugene L. Kelleher	20,331	8.82
Democratic	Jane Walsh-Waitkus	20,287	8.80
Republican	Robert W. Schnee	19,487	8.46
Republican	Stephen J. Urban (incumbent)	19,117	8.29
Democratic	John Gadomski	18,214	7.90
Democratic	Anthony J. Rostock	17,661	7.66
Republican	Marc Dixon	17,577	7.63
Republican	Ray Gustave	16,491	7.16
Republican	Mark A. Rabo	14,898	6.46
	Write-in	486	0.21
Total votes		230,474	100

== 2017 county council election ==
The fourth set of primary elections were held on Tuesday, May 16, 2017. Five Democrats and five Republicans were nominated. Republican Kathy Dobash and Democrat Eileen Sorokas did not seek re-election.

2017 Luzerne County Council Democratic primary election
Party	Candidate	Votes	%
Democratic	Shelia Saidman	9,332	13.90
Democratic	Linda McClosky Houck (incumbent)	9,318	13.88
Democratic	Wendy Cominsky	8,472	12.62
Democratic	Matthew Vough	8,143	12.13
Democratic	John Gadomski	7,706	11.48
Democratic	Anthony J. Bartoli	7,169	10.68
Democratic	Phil Gianfarcaro	6,237	9.29
Democratic	James D. Watkinson Jr.	5,567	8.29
Write-in		398	0.59
Total votes		67,120	100.00

2017 Luzerne County Council Republican primary election
Party	Candidate	Votes	%
Republican	Harry Haas (incumbent)	9,018	21.50
Republican	Chris R. Perry	8,503	20,27
Republican	Marc Dixon	8,368	19.95
Republican	Stephen J. Urban	8,363	19.94
Republican	Gregory S. Wolovich Jr.	6,958	16.59
Write-in		729	1.74
Total votes		41,939	100.00

The fourth general election was held on Tuesday, November 7, 2017. Independent councilman Rick Williams, who as an independent did not appear on any primary ballot, did not seek reelection. Sheila Saidman, Matthew Vough, and Chris R. Perry were newly elected to council. The Democratic majority grew from seven seats to eight.

Seats after the election
Party	Number of seats
Democratic	8
Republican	3

2017 Luzerne County Council general election
Party	Candidate	Votes	%
Democratic	Sheila Saidman	21,415	10.92
Democratic	Matthew Vough	20,393	10.39
Democratic	Linda McClosky Houck (incumbent)	20,380	10.39
Republican	Harry Haas (incumbent)	20,328	10.36
Republican	Chris R. Perry	20,138	10.26
Republican	Stephen J. Urban	19,770	10.08
Democratic	Wendy Cominsky	19,375	9.88
Republican	Marc Dixon	19,125	9.75
Democratic	John Gadomski	18,349	9.35
Republican	Gregory S. Wolovich Jr.	16,631	8.48
	Write-in	278	0.14
Total votes		196,182	100

== 2019 county council election ==
The fifth round of primary elections were held on Tuesday, May 21, 2019. Six Democrats and six Republicans were nominated. Democrat Edward Brominski, who was up for re-election that year, resigned in January due to health issues. By February, the council appointed Patrick Bilbow to serve out the remainder of his term. Republican Eugene Kelleher, also up for re-election in 2019, resigned in August. His seat was filled by Rick Morelli, who did not seek election to a full term. Democrat Stephen A. Urban did not seek re-election.

Only four Republicans appeared on the ballot, the other two nominations were secured via write-in vote. Lee Ann McDermott had 454 write-in votes, and Councilman Robert Schnee received 417 write-in votes. Because Schnee had also won a Democratic nomination, he became the only candidate in council history to appear on the November ballot as both a Democrat and a Republican.

2019 Luzerne County Council Democratic primary election
Party	Candidate	Votes	%
Democratic	Tim McGinley (incumbent)	13,089	17.91
Democratic	Joseph C. Sebastianelli	11,253	15.40
Democratic	Jane Walsh-Waitkus (incumbent)	11,026	15.09
Democratic	Patrick M. Bilbow (incumbent)	11,001	15.06
Democratic	Robert Schnee (incumbent)	9,303	12.73
Democratic	Anup K. Patel	8,731	11.95
Democratic	Martin Dartoe	7,874	10.78
Write-in		7.92	1.08
Total votes		73,069	100.00

2019 Luzerne County Council Republican primary election
Party	Candidate	Votes	%
Republican	Stephen J. Urban	9,308	25.29
Republican	Walter L. Griffith Jr.	8,969	24.37
Republican	Kendra M. Radle	8,238	22.38
Republican	Gregory S. Wolovich Jr.	7,915	21.50
Write-in	Lee Ann McDermott	454	1.23
Write-in	Robert Schnee	417	1.13
Write-in	Other write-in candidates	1,508	4.10
Total votes		36,809	100.00

Following the November 5 general election, the balance of power shifted for the first time in council history with Republicans securing the majority. Republicans Lee Ann McDermott, Walter Griffith, and Kendra Radle were newly elected to council. Former Republican Councilman Stephen J. Urban, who lost his seat four years earlier, was also elected. Incumbent Democrats Patrick Bilbow and Jane Walsh-Waitkus lost their seats. Although Schnee secured both the Democratic and Republican nominations in 2019, he was sworn in as a Democrat.

Seats after the election
Party	Number of seats
Republican	6
Democratic	5
Note: Robert Schnee secured both Democrat and Republican nominations, but was sworn in as a Democrat.

2019 Luzerne County Council general election
Party	Candidate	Votes	%
Democratic/Republican	Robert W. Schnee (incumbent)	28,588	11.02
Republican	Lee Ann McDermott	25,752	9.93
Republican	Walter L. Griffith Jr.	24,314	9.37
Republican	Stephen J. Urban	24,246	9.35
Democratic	Tim McGinley (incumbent)	23,909	9.22
Republican	Kendra M. Radle	22,950	8.85
Democratic	Joseph C. Sebastianelli	22,622	8.72
Democratic	Patrick M. Bilbow (incumbent)	22,263	8.58
Democratic	Anup K. Patel	21,575	8.32
Democratic	Jane Walsh-Waitkus (incumbent)	21,483	8.28
Republican	Gregory S. Wolovich Jr.	20,931	8.07
Write-in		727	0.28
Total votes		259,360	100.00

== 2021 county council election ==
The sixth round of primary elections were held on Tuesday, May 15, 2021. Five Democrats and five Republicans were nominated. Democrat Linda McClosky Houck and Republican Harry Haas were prevented from running again due to term limits.

2021 Luzerne County Council Democratic primary election
Party	Candidate	Votes	%
Democratic	Matthew Vough (incumbent)	18,309	21.77
Democratic	Shelia Saidman (incumbent)	18,020	21.43
Democratic	Jane Walsh Waitkus	16,131	19.18
Democratic	Maryann V. Velez	15,853	18.85
Democratic	Jimmy Sabatino	15,154	18.02
	Scattered	254	0.30
Total votes		84,094	100.00

2021 Luzerne County Council Republican primary election
Party	Candidate	Votes	%
Republican	John Lombardo	11,747	14.78
Republican	Gregory S. Wolovich Jr.	10,508	13.22
Republican	Chris R. Perry (incumbent)	10,379	13.06
Republican	Brian Thornton	8,810	11.09
Republican	Kevin Lescavage	8,603	10.83
Republican	Ronald D. Knapp	8,546	10.75
Republican	Carl G. Bienias III	8,383	10.55
Republican	Michael G. Vacendak	6,607	8.31
Republican	Martin L. Dartoe	5,444	6.85
	Scattered	279	0.35
Total votes		79,470	100.00

The sixth general election was held on Tuesday, November 2, 2021. Incumbent Democrats Sheila Saidman and Matthew Vough were defeated for re-election. Republicans swept all contested seats in the election; the party's majority grew to 10. Democrat Robert Schnee had previously change his affiliation to Republican in June 2020. Councilman Tim McGinley was left as the only Democrat on council. Incumbent Councilman Walter Griffith, who was not up for re-election, was elected as county controller in 2021. He remained in his council seat until the end of the year. He was replaced by Carl Bienias III in February 2022.

Seats after the election
Party	Number of seats
Republican	10
Democratic	1
Note: Robert Schnee switched from Democrat to Republican in June 2020.

2021 Luzerne County Council general election
Party	Candidate	Votes	%
Republican	John Lombardo	31,314	12.00
Republican	Chris R. Perry (incumbent)	30,296	11.61
Republican	Brian Thornton	28,787	11.04
Republican	Kevin Lescavage	27,280	10.46
Republican	Gregory S. Wolovich Jr.	26,610	10.20
Democratic	Matthew Vough (incumbent)	25,622	9.82
Democratic	Sheila Saidman (incumbent)	24,600	9.43
Democratic	Jane Walsh Waitkus	22,704	8.70
Democratic	Jimmy Sabatino	22,433	8.60
Democratic	Maryann V. Velez	20,530	7.87
Write-in		674	0.23
Total votes		260,850	100.00

== 2023 county council election ==
The seventh round of primary elections were held on Tuesday, May 16, 2023. Six Democrats and six Republicans were nominated. Republican Robert Schnee resigned after winning a special election for state representative. He was replaced by Matthew Mitchell in June 2022. Republican Kendra (Radle) Vough did not seek re-election. Democrat Tim McGinley was term limited and prevented from running again; he was the last remaining inaugural member on the council. Republican Carl Bienias III lost re-nomination.

2023 Luzerne County Council Democratic primary election
Party	Candidate	Votes	%
Democratic	Joanna Bryn Smith	14,034	15.96
Democratic	Patricia Krushnowski	13,378	15.21
Democratic	Brittany Stephenson	13,042	14.83
Democratic	Michelle Rothenbecker	12,896	14.66
Democratic	Jimmy Sabatino	12,596	14.32
Democratic	Maryann Velez	12,421	14.12
Democratic	Damon Saxon	8,552	9.73
Write-in		1,019	1.16
Total votes		87,938	100.00

2023 Luzerne County Council Republican primary election
Party	Candidate	Votes	%
Republican	Stephen J. Urban (incumbent)	9,915	11.27
Republican	Lee Ann McDermott (incumbent)	9,568	10.88
Republican	Harry Haas	8,744	9.94
Republican	Thomas Dombroski	8,032	9.13
Republican	Kimberly Platek	8,010	9.11
Republican	Matthew Mitchell (incumbent)	7,535	8.57
Republican	Gregory W. Griffin	7,376	8.38
Republican	Anthony Corrado	6,865	7.80
Republican	Carl Bienias III (incumbent)	6,377	7.25
Republican	Richard Tihansky	5,717	6.50
Republican	Ronald D. Knapp	4,874	5.54
Republican	Vivian Kreidler-Licina	4,320	4.91
Write-in		634	0.72
Total votes		87,967	100.00

The seventh general election took place on Tuesday, November 7, 2023. Incumbent Republicans Stephen J. Urban and Matthew Mitchell lost re-election.

Seats after the election
Party	Number of seats
Republican	7
Democratic	4

2023 Luzerne County Council general election
Party	Candidate	Votes	%
Republican	Lee Ann McDermott (incumbent)	28,356	8.93
Democratic	Jimmy Sabatino	28,176	8.87
Democratic	Joanna Bryn Smith	27,993	8.82
Democratic	Patricia Krushnowski	27,018	8.51
Republican	Harry Haas	26,878	8.46
Democratic	Brittany Stephenson	26,429	8.32
Democratic	Michelle Rothenbecker	25,651	8.08
Democratic	Maryann Velez	24,322	7.66
Republican	Thomas Dombroski	24,035	7.57
Republican	Stephen J. Urban (incumbent)	24,024	7.57
Republican	Matthew Mitchell (incumbent)	23,701	7.46
Republican	Kimberly Platek	23,459	7.39
Write-in		3,759	1.18
Total votes		317,560	100.00

== 2025 county council election ==
The eighth general election for Luzerne County Council took place on November 4, 2025. The primary happened on May 20, 2025. Five Democratics and five Republicans were nominated. Incumbent Chris Perry did not seek reelection. Incumbent Kevin Lescavage lost renomination.

2025 Luzerne County Council Democratic primary election
Party	Candidate	Votes	%
Democratic	Denise Williams	14,771	18.64
Democratic	Dawn Simmons	12,582	15.88
Democratic	Chris Belles	12,156	15.34
Democratic	Steven M. Coslett	11,606	14.64
Democratic	Tony Perzia	10,699	13.50
Democratic	Emily Singh	8,845	11.16
Democratic	Johnny Price	8,137	10.26
Write-in		453	0.57
Total votes		79,249	100.00

2025 Luzerne County Council Republican primary election
Party	Candidate	Votes	%
Republican	John Lombardo (incumbent)	12,123	15.73
Republican	Brian Thornton (incumbent)	9,888	12.83
Republican	Stephen J. Urban	9,093	11.80
Republican	Jackie Scarcella	9,041	11.73
Republican	Greg Wolovich (incumbent)	8,675	11.26
Republican	Kevin Lescavage (incumbent)	8,379	10.87
Republican	Thomas Dombroski	8,061	10.46
Republican	Ronald D. Knapp	6,669	8.65
Republican	Rob Viars	4,766	6.18
Write-in		376	0.49
Total votes		77,071	100.00

The general election took place on November 4, 2025. Democrats regained control of council. Council chair John Lombardo was the only Republican and the only incumbent to be reelected; incumbents Brian Thornton and Greg Wolovich lost reelection. The Democrats' success was in tandem with a "blue wave" in other elections across the state and country.

Seats after the election
Party	Number of seats
Democratic	8
Republican	3

2025 Luzerne County Council general election
Party	Candidate	Votes	%
Democratic	Denise Williams	38,557	11.08
Republican	John Lombardo (incumbent)	37,523	10.78
Democratic	Steven M. Coslett	36,266	10.42
Democratic	Chris Belles	36,202	10.40
Democratic	Dawn Simmons	34,696	9.97
Republican	Jackie Scarcella	33,959	9.76
Republican	Brian Thornton (incumbent)	33,243	9.55
Republican	Stephen J. Urban	32,986	9.48
Democratic	Tony Perzia	32,154	9.24
Republican	Greg Wolovich (incumbent)	31,966	9.18
Write-in		519	0.15
Total votes		348,071	100.00

== 2027 county council election ==
The next primary will take place on Tuesday, May 18, 2027. There will be 6 Democrat and 6 Republican nominees. Other third-party or independent candidates may also join the race. All candidates will square off on the November ballot. The top six candidates will be elected or reelected to council. In January 2028, council will take their oath of office.

== Sources ==
- "2011 Municipal Primary May 17, 2011" (PDF). Luzerne County, Pennsylvania. May 24, 2011a.
- "2013 Municipal Primary May 21, 2013" (PDF). Luzerne County, Pennsylvania. June 3, 2013a.
- "Election Summary Report Luzerne County OFFICIAL RESULTS May 16, 2023 Closed Primary" (PDF). Luzerne County, Pennsylvania. June 13, 2023a.
