= 2010 United States elections =

- ← 2008 2009 2010 2011 2012 → Midterm elections
- Election day: November 2
- Incumbent president: ▌Barack Obama (D)
- Next Congress: 112th

Senate elections
- Overall control: Democratic hold
- Seats contested: 38 of 100 seats (34 seats of Class III + 5 special elections)
- Net seat change: Republican +6
- 2010 Senate election results map Republican gain Democratic hold Republican hold

House elections
- Overall control: Republican gain
- Seats contested: All 435 voting seats
- Popular vote margin: Republican +6.8%
- Net seat change: Republican +63
- 2010 House election results map Democratic hold Republican hold Democratic gain Republican gain

Gubernatorial elections
- Seats contested: 39 (37 states, 2 territories)
- Net seat change: Republican +6
- 2010 gubernatorial election results map Democratic gain Republican gain Democratic hold Republican hold Independent gain

Elections were held in the United States on November 2, 2010, in the middle of Democratic President Barack Obama's first term. Republicans ended unified Democratic control of Congress and the presidency by winning a majority in the House of Representatives and gained seats in the Senate despite Democrats holding Senate control.

Republicans gained seven seats in the Senate (including a special election held in January 2010) but failed to gain a majority in the chamber. In the House of Representatives, Republicans won a net gain of 63 seats, the largest shift in seats since the 1948 elections. In state elections, Republicans won a net gain of six gubernatorial seats and flipped control of twenty state legislative chambers, giving them a substantial advantage in the redistricting that occurred following the 2010 United States census. The election was widely characterized as a "Republican wave" election, and President Obama called it "a shellacking."

The heavy Democratic losses in 2010 were mainly attributed to the passing of the Affordable Care Act along with a poor economic recovery from the Great Recession and large budget deficits. This marked the first election since 1858 that yielded a Republican-controlled House and a Democratic-controlled Senate.

== Issues ==
Candidates and voters in 2010 focused on national economic conditions and the economic policies of the Obama administration and congressional Democrats. Attention was paid to public anger over the Wall Street bailout signed into law by President George W. Bush in late 2008. Voters were also motivated for and against the sweeping reforms of the health care system enacted by Democrats in 2010, as well as concerns over tax rates and record deficits. At the time of the election, unemployment was over 9%, and had not declined significantly since Barack Obama had become president. Further eroding public trust in Congress were a series of scandals that saw Democratic representatives Charlie Rangel and Maxine Waters, as well as Republican senator John Ensign, all accused of unethical or illegal conduct in the months leading up to the 2010 election.

Immigration reform had become an important issue in 2010, particularly following the passage of Arizona Senate Bill 1070, officially known as the Support Our Law Enforcement and Safe Neighborhoods Act. The Act greatly enhanced the power of Arizona's law enforcement agencies to investigate the immigration status of suspected illegal immigrants and to enforce state and national immigration laws. The Act also required immigrants to carry their immigration documentation on their person at all times. Its passage by a Republican-led legislature and its subsequent and very public signing by Jan Brewer, the Republican Governor of Arizona, ignited protests across the Southwest and galvanized political opinion among both pro-immigration Latino groups and Tea Party activists, many of whom supported stronger measures to stem illegal immigration.

The passage of the controversial Patient Protection and Affordable Care Act also contributed to the low approval ratings of Congress, particularly Democrats, in the months leading up to the election. Many Republicans ran on a promise to repeal the law, and beat incumbent Democratic opponents who had voted in favor of the Patient Protection and Affordable Care Act.

== Federal elections ==
=== Congressional elections ===
==== Senate elections ====
On January 19, 2010, a special election was also held for the Class I seat in Massachusetts, as a result of the death of incumbent Senator Ted Kennedy. Republican Scott Brown won the seat.

The 34 seats in the United States Senate Class III were up for election. In addition, the Class I/II seats held by appointed Senators Ted Kaufman of Delaware, Kirsten Gillibrand of New York, and Carte Goodwin of West Virginia were contested in special elections on the same day. Republicans picked up six seats, but Democrats retained a majority in the Senate.

==== House of Representatives elections ====
All 435 voting seats in the United States House of Representatives were up for election. Additionally, elections were held to select the delegates for the District of Columbia and four of the five U.S. territories. The only seat in the House not up for election was that of the Resident Commissioner of Puerto Rico, who serves a four-year term and faced election in 2012. Republicans won the nationwide popular vote for the House of Representatives by a margin of 6.8 points and picked up 63 seats, taking control of the chamber for the first time since the 2006 elections. This represented the largest single-election shift in House seats since the 1948 elections and the largest midterm election shift since the 1938 elections. The only seat Democrats flipped without unseating a Republican was Delaware's lone House seat, going to former Lt. Governor John Carney.

== State elections ==
Partisan control of state governments after the 2010 elections: Democrats maintained trifecta Democrats gained trifecta Republicans maintained trifecta Republican gained trifecta Divided government maintained Divided government established Officially non-partisan legislature

=== Gubernatorial elections ===
37 state and two territory United States governors were up for election. Republicans picked up a net of six state governorships; Democrats won control of five governorships previously controlled by Republicans, but Republicans took 11 governorships.

=== Other statewide elections ===
In many states where the following positions are elected offices, voters elected state executive branch offices (including Lieutenant Governors (though some will be voted for on the same ticket as the gubernatorial nominee), Secretary of state, state Treasurer, state Auditor, state Attorney General, state Superintendent of Education, Commissioners of Insurance, Agriculture or, Labor, etc.) and state judicial branch offices (seats on state Supreme Courts and, in some states, state appellate courts).

Future Vice President Kamala Harris won the 2010 California Attorney General election by less than 1%.

=== State legislative elections ===
Republicans made substantial gains in state legislatures across the nation. Twenty chambers flipped from Democratic to Republican control, giving Republicans full control of eleven state legislatures and control of one chamber in Colorado, Iowa, and New York. Additionally, Republicans gained enough seats in the Oregon House of Representatives to produce a 30-30 party split, pushing Democrats into a power-sharing agreement that resulted in the election of two "co-speakers" (one from each party) to lead the chamber. Republicans gained a net of 680 seats in state legislative races, breaking the previous record of 628 flipped seats set by Democrats in the post-Watergate elections of 1974.

Six states saw both chambers switch from Democrat to Republican majorities: Alabama (where the Republicans won a majority and a trifecta for the first time since 1874), Maine (for the first time since 1975 and a trifecta for the first time since 1965), Minnesota (for the first time since 1915 in partisan elections and 1973 in non-partisan elections), New Hampshire, North Carolina (for the first time since 1896), and Wisconsin. In addition, by picking up the lower chambers in Indiana, Ohio, Michigan, Montana (Note: Prior to the 2010 election, the 100 seats in the Montana House of Representatives were evenly split between Democrats and Republicans, but the Democratic Party controlled the chamber by virtue of holding the governor's office.) and Pennsylvania, Republicans gained control of both chambers in an additional five states. Furthermore, Republicans picked up one chamber from Democrats in Colorado, Iowa, and New York to split control in those states. They expanded majorities in both chambers in Texas, Florida, and Georgia.

== Local elections ==
On November 2, 2010, various cities, counties, school boards, and special districts (in the United States) witnessed elections. Some elections were high-profile.

- Luzerne County, Pennsylvania: The voters of Luzerne County adopted a home rule charter by a margin of 51,413 to 41,639. This changed the county's government from a board of county commissioners to a council-manager form of government. The following year (in 2011), the first general election for the new assembly was held. The first council members were sworn in on January 2, 2012.

High-profile mayoral elections are listed below:

- Honolulu, Hawaii: Incumbent mayor Mufi Hannemann resigned on July 20, 2010, to run for Governor of Hawaii. The city's Managing Director Kirk Caldwell served as acting mayor until Peter Carlisle was elected in a special election on September 18.
- Louisville, Kentucky: Incumbent mayor Jerry Abramson declined to run for a third consecutive term in order to run for Lieutenant Governor of Kentucky in 2011. Greg Fischer was elected as the successor.
- New Orleans, Louisiana: Incumbent mayor Ray Nagin was term-limited out of office. Mitch Landrieu was elected as the new mayor on February 6.
- Washington, D.C.: Incumbent mayor Adrian Fenty was defeated in the Democratic primary by Vincent C. Gray, who then went on to win the general election.

== Turnout ==
Approximately 82.5 million people voted. Turnout increased relative to the previous U.S. midterm elections without any significant shift in voters' political identification.

== Table of federal and state results ==
Bold indicates a change in control. Note that not all states held gubernatorial, state legislative, and United States Senate elections in 2010.

State		Before 2010 elections				After 2010 elections			
State	PVI	Governor	State leg.	US Senate	US House	Governor	State leg.	US Senate	US House
Alabama	R+13	Rep	Dem	Rep	Rep 5–2	Rep	**Rep**	Rep	Rep 6–1
Alaska	R+13	Rep	Split	Split	Rep 1–0	Rep	Split	Split	Rep 1–0
Arizona	R+6	Rep	Rep	Rep	Dem 5–3	Rep	Rep	Rep	**Rep** 5–3
Arkansas	R+9	Dem	Dem	Dem	Dem 3–1	Dem	Dem	**Split**	**Rep** 3–1
California	D+7	Rep	Dem	Dem	Dem 34–19	**Dem**	Dem	Dem	Dem 34–19
Colorado	Even	Dem	Dem	Dem	Dem 5–2	Dem	**Split**	Dem	**Rep** 4–3
Connecticut	D+7	Rep	Dem	Split D/I (Note: Joe Lieberman was elected as an independent but continued to caucus with Senate Democrats. Connecticut's other Senator was a Democrat.)	Dem 5–0	**Dem**	Dem	Split D/I	Dem 5–0
Delaware	D+7	Dem	Dem	Dem	Rep 1–0	Dem	Dem	Dem	**Dem** 1–0
Florida	R+2	Ind	Rep	Split	Rep 15–10	**Rep**	Rep	Split	Rep 19–6
Georgia	R+7	Rep	Rep	Rep	Rep 7–6	Rep	Rep	Rep	Rep 8–5
Hawaii	D+12	Rep	Dem	Dem	Split 1–1	**Dem**	Dem	Dem	**Dem** 2–0
Idaho	R+17	Rep	Rep	Rep	Split 1–1	Rep	Rep	Rep	**Rep** 2–0
Illinois	D+8	Dem	Dem	Dem	Dem 12–7	Dem	Dem	**Split**	**Rep** 11–8
Indiana	R+6	Rep	Split	Split	Dem 5–3	Rep	**Rep**	**Rep**	**Rep** 6–3
Iowa	D+1	Dem	Dem	Split	Dem 3–2	**Rep**	**Split**	Split	Dem 3–2
Kansas	R+11	Dem	Rep	Rep	Rep 3–1	**Rep**	Rep	Rep	Rep 4–0
Kentucky	R+10	Dem	Split	Rep	Rep 4–2	Dem	Split	Rep	Rep 4–2
Louisiana	R+10	Rep	Dem	Split	Rep 6–1	Rep	Dem	Split	Rep 6–1
Maine	D+5	Dem	Dem	Rep	Dem 2–0	**Rep**	**Rep**	Rep	Dem 2–0
Maryland	D+9	Dem	Dem	Dem	Dem 7–1	Dem	Dem	Dem	Dem 6–2
Massachusetts	D+12	Dem	Dem	Split	Dem 10–0	Dem	Dem	Split	Dem 10–0
Michigan	D+4	Dem	Split	Dem	Dem 8–7	**Rep**	**Rep**	Dem	**Rep** 9–6
Minnesota	D+2	Rep	Dem	Dem	Dem 5–3	**Dem**	**Rep**	Dem	**Split** 4–4
Mississippi	R+10	Rep	Dem	Rep	Dem 3–1	Rep	Dem	Rep	**Rep** 3–1
Missouri	R+3	Dem	Rep	Split	Rep 5–4	Dem	Rep	Split	Rep 6–3
Montana	R+7	Dem	Split	Dem	Rep 1–0	Dem	**Rep**	Dem	Rep 1–0
Nebraska	R+13	Rep	NP	Split	Rep 3–0	Rep	NP	Split	Rep 3–0
Nevada	D+1	Rep	Dem	Split	Dem 2–1	Rep	Dem	Split	**Rep** 2–1
New Hampshire	D+2	Dem	Dem	Split	Dem 2–0	Dem	**Rep**	Split	**Rep** 2–0
New Jersey	D+4	Rep	Dem	Dem	Dem 8–5	Rep	Dem	Dem	Dem 7–6
New Mexico	D+2	Dem	Dem	Dem	Dem 3–0	**Rep**	Dem	Dem	Dem 2–1
New York	D+10	Dem	Dem	Dem	Dem 26–2	Dem	**Split**	Dem	Dem 21–8
North Carolina	R+4	Dem	Dem	Split	Dem 8–5	Dem	**Rep**	Split	Dem 7–6
North Dakota	R+10	Rep	Rep	Dem	Dem 1–0	Rep	Rep	**Split**	**Rep** 1–0
Ohio	R+1	Dem	Split	Split	Dem 10–8	**Rep**	**Rep**	Split	**Rep** 13–5
Oklahoma	R+17	Dem	Rep	Rep	Rep 4–1	**Rep**	Rep	Rep	Rep 4–1
Oregon	D+4	Dem	Dem	Dem	Dem 4–1	Dem	**Split**	Dem	Dem 4–1
Pennsylvania	D+2	Dem	Split	Dem	Dem 12–7	**Rep**	**Rep**	**Spilt**	**Rep** 12–7
Rhode Island	D+11	Rep	Dem	Dem	Dem 2–0	**Ind**	Dem	Dem	Dem 2–0
South Carolina	R+8	Rep	Rep	Rep	Rep 4–2	Rep	Rep	Rep	Rep 5–1
South Dakota	R+9	Rep	Rep	Split	Dem 1–0	Rep	Rep	Split	**Rep** 1–0
Tennessee	R+9	Dem	Rep	Rep	Dem 5–4	**Rep**	Rep	Rep	**Rep** 7–2
Texas	R+10	Rep	Rep	Rep	Rep 20–12	Rep	Rep	Rep	Rep 23–9
Utah	R+20	Rep	Rep	Rep	Rep 2–1	Rep	Rep	Rep	Rep 2–1
Vermont	D+13	Rep	Dem	Split D/I (Note: Bernie Sanders was elected as an independent but caucused with Senate Democrats. Vermont's other Senator was a Democrat.)	Dem 1–0	**Dem**	Dem	Split D/I	Dem 1–0
Virginia	R+2	Rep	Split	Dem	Dem 6–5	Rep	Split	Dem	**Rep** 8–3
Washington	D+5	Dem	Dem	Dem	Dem 6–3	Dem	Dem	Dem	Dem 5–4
West Virginia	R+8	Dem	Dem	Dem	Dem 2–1	Dem	Dem	Dem	**Rep** 2–1
Wisconsin	D+2	Dem	Dem	Dem	Dem 5–3	**Rep**	**Rep**	**Split**	**Rep** 5–3
Wyoming	R+20	Dem	Rep	Rep	Rep 1–0	**Rep**	Rep	Rep	Rep 1–0
United States	Even	Dem 26–23	Dem 27–14	Dem 59–41	Dem 255–178	**Rep 29–20**	**Rep 25–16**	Dem 53–47	**Rep 242–193**
Washington, D.C.	D+43	Dem (Note: Washington, D.C. does not elect a governor or state legislature, but it does elect a mayor and a city council.)	Dem	—N/a	Dem	Dem	Dem	—N/a	Dem
American Samoa	—N/a	NP/D (Note: Although elections for governor of American Samoa are non-partisan, Governor Togiola Tulafono affiliates with the Democratic party at the national level.)	NP	—N/a	Dem	NP/D	NP	—N/a	Dem
Guam	—N/a	Rep	Dem	—N/a	Dem	Rep	Dem	—N/a	Dem
N. Mariana Islands	—N/a	CP	Rep	—N/a	Ind (Note: Northern Marianas Islands Delegate Gregorio Sablan was elected as an independent in 2008 and caucused with the Democrats in Congress after taking office in 2009.)	CP	Rep	—N/a	**Dem** (Note: Sablan was re-elected as a Democrat in 2010.)
Puerto Rico	—N/a	PNP/R (Note: Puerto Rican Governor Luis Fortuño is a member of the New Progressive Party but affiliates with the Republican Party at the national level.)	PNP	—N/a	PNP/D (Note: Puerto Rico's Resident Commissioner, Pedro Pierluisi, was elected as a member of the New Progressive Party and has caucused with the Democrats since taking office in 2009.)	PNP/R	PNP	—N/a	PNP/D
U.S. Virgin Islands	—N/a	Dem	Dem	—N/a	Dem	Dem	Dem	—N/a	Dem
Subdivision	PVI	Governor	State leg.	U.S. Senate	U.S. House	Governor	State leg.	U.S. Senate	U.S. House
Subdivision and PVI		Before 2010 elections				After 2010 elections			
