= Robert Schnee =

American politician

Member of the Pennsylvania House of Representatives from the 116th district
- In office April 26, 2022 – January 3, 2023
- Preceded by: Tarah Toohil
- Succeeded by: Dane Watro

Member of the Luzerne County Council
- In office January 4, 2016 – April 26, 2022
- Succeeded by: Matthew Mitchell

Personal details
- Party: Republican (since 2020)
- Other political affiliations: Democratic (until 2020)

Robert Schnee is an American politician who was elected to serve as a member of the Pennsylvania House of Representatives from the 116th district on April 5, 2022.

== Career ==
Schnee has served as a member of the Luzerne County Council since 2016. In April 2019, he was criticized after describing Luzerne County as "like the black child here" during a council work session on county roads. Schnee later issued an apology for the comment while maintaining that the comparison was not intended to be disrespectful.

Schnee was a meter reader for the Hazleton City Authority in Hazleton, Pennsylvania. He was elected to the Pennsylvania House of Representatives in an April 2022 special election to replace Tarah Toohil. He did not stand for re-election in 2022 and was succeeded by Dane Watro.

== Election history ==
=== 2015 Luzerne County Council election ===
2015 Luzerne County general election
Party	Candidate	Votes	%
Democratic	Tim McGinley (incumbent)	23,892	10.37
Democratic	Edward A. Brominski (incumbent)	21,066	9.14
Democratic	Stephen A. Urban (incumbent)	20,967	9.10
Republican	Eugene L. Kelleher	20,331	8.82
Democratic	Jane Walsh-Waitkus	20,287	8.80
Republican	Robert W. Schnee	19,487	8.46
Republican	Stephen J. Urban (incumbent)	19,117	8.29
Democratic	John Gadomski	18,214	7.90
Democratic	Anthony J. Rostock	17,661	7.66
Republican	Marc Dixon	17,577	7.63
Republican	Ray Gustave	16,491	7.16
Republican	Mark A. Rabo	14,898	6.46
	Write-in	486	0.21
Total votes		230,474	100

=== 2019 Luzerne County Council election ===
2019 Luzerne County general election
Party	Candidate	Votes	%
Democratic/Republican	Robert W. Schnee (incumbent)	28,588	11.02
Republican	Lee Ann McDermott	25,752	9.93
Republican	Walter L. Griffith, Jr.	24,314	9.37
Republican	Stephen J. Urban	24,246	9.35
Democratic	Tim McGinley (incumbent)	23,909	9.22
Republican	Kendra M. Radle	22,950	8.85
Democratic	Joseph C. Sebastianelli	22,622	8.72
Democratic	Patrick M. Bilbow (incumbent)	22,263	8.58
Democratic	Anup K. Patel	21,575	8.32
Democratic	Jane Walsh-Waitkus (incumbent)	21,483	8.28
Republican	Gregory S. Wolovich, Jr.	20,931	8.07
	Write-in	727	0.28
Total votes		259,360	100

=== 2022 Pennsylvania House special election ===
2022 PA House special election for the 116th district
Party	Candidate	Votes	%
Republican	Robert W. Schnee	2,797	56.04
Democratic	Amilcar Arroyo	1,262	25.29
Libertarian	Paul Cwalina	211	4.23
	Write-in	721	14.44
Total votes		4,991	100
