= Dane Watro =

American politician

Member of the Pennsylvania House of Representatives from the 116th district
- Incumbent
- Assumed office January 3, 2023
- Preceded by: Robert Schnee

Mayor of McAdoo, Pennsylvania
- In office 2010–2013
- In office 2018–2021

Personal details
- Party: Republican
- Spouse: Angela Watro
- Children: 2
- Education: Central Texas College
- Website: repwatro.com

Military service
- Branch/service: United States Army
- Years of service: 1995–2005
- Battles/wars: Iraq War

Dane Watro is an American politician serving as a member of the Pennsylvania House of Representatives for the 116th district. Elected in November 2022, he assumed office on January 3, 2023.

== Early life and education ==
Watro attended the Hazleton Area High School, graduating in 1995. While stationed at Fort Hood, he studied criminal justice at Central Texas College.

== Career ==
After graduating from high school, Watro enlisted in the United States Army and was posted at the Korean Demilitarized Zone and Fort Hood. He reenlisted with the onset of the Iraq War. After training at Fort Dix, he deployed to Baghdad and was selected by the Federal Bureau of Investigation to be a part of the American unit guarding Saddam Hussein. He was honorably discharged in March 2005.

After leaving the Army, he worked as president of Schuylkill County Concerned Citizens. He also served as the vice chairman of the Kline Township Municipal Authority. Watro was a member of the Uniform Construction Code Appeals Board for McAdoo before being elected the borough's mayor. He served as mayor for two non-continuous terms, first from 2010 to 2013, and again from 2018 to 2021.

In 2022, Republican Robert Schnee, who filled the remainder of the term of former State Representative and current Luzerne County Judge Tarah Toohil, opted not to run for a full term. As such, there was a crowded field of Republican challengers to take his place in a primary. Watro placed first in the primary and defeated Democratic nominee Yesenia Rodriguez in the general election. Watro described being elected to the Pennsylvania house as "the most humbling experience I’ve ever had in my entire life."

Watro announced that his district offices would be located in Hazleton, Pennsylvania and Mahanoy City, Pennsylvania.

Watro was placed in charge of the state's Trout stocking schedule in conjunction with the Pennsylvania Fish and Boat Commission, which will stock Pennsylvania's rivers and lakes with 3.1 million trout for the start of trout season on April 1, 2023.

== Personal life ==
Watro is married to Angela Watro and together they have two daughters. He is a member of Veterans of Foreign Wars, Lions Clubs International, and AMVETS. Watro is a Catholic, and lives in Kline Township. He has been active in several local charities including the Hazleton United Children's Home, and United Charities Inc.

== Election results ==
PA House election, 2022 Republican Primary: Pennsylvania House, District 116
Party	Candidate	Votes	%
Republican	Dane Watro	2,188	40.41%
Republican	Mike LaRocca	956	17.65%
Republican	John Chura	809	14.94%
Republican	Gary Perna	594	10.97%
Republican	Nico R. Makuta	471	8.7%
Republican	Dyllan Angelo-Ogurkis	382	7.05%
Margin of victory		1,232	22.76%
Turnout		5,018	100%

PA House election, 2022: Pennsylvania House, District 116
Party	Candidate	Votes	%
Republican	Dane Watro	9,773	67.6%
Democratic	Yesenia Rodriguez	4,531	31.4%
Margin of victory		5,242	36.2%
Turnout		14,304	100%
