= Ronald Gatski =

American politician

Member of the Pennsylvania House of Representatives from the 116th district
- In office January 4, 1977 – November 30, 1980
- Preceded by: James Ustynoski
- Succeeded by: Correale Stevens

Personal details
- Born: January 10, 1935 Hazleton, Pennsylvania, U.S.
- Died: April 6, 2017 (aged 82) Hazleton, Pennsylvania, U.S.
- Party: Democratic

Ronald B. Gatski (January 10, 1935 – April 6, 2017) was a Democratic member of the Pennsylvania House of Representatives.
