= Tom Stish =

American politician (born 1950)

Thomas B. Stish

Member of the Pennsylvania House of Representatives from the 116th district
- In office January 3, 1989 – November 30, 1996
- Preceded by: Correale Stevens
- Succeeded by: Todd Eachus

Personal details
- Born: January 22, 1950 (age 76) Hazleton, Pennsylvania, United States
- Party: Democratic

Thomas B. Stish (born January 22, 1950) is a former Democratic member of the Pennsylvania House of Representatives.
