= Tarah Toohil =

American judge and politician

Member of the Pennsylvania House of Representatives from the 116th district
- In office January 4, 2011 – December 31, 2021
- Preceded by: Todd Eachus
- Succeeded by: Robert Schnee

Personal details
- Born: October 1, 1979 (age 46) Drums, Pennsylvania, U.S.
- Party: Republican
- Education: Northeastern University (BA); Pennsylvania State University (JD)

Tarah C. Toohil (born October 1, 1979) is an American attorney and politician who served as a member of the Pennsylvania House of Representatives from 2011 to 2021. She is currently a judge on the Luzerne County Court of Common Pleas.

== Early life and education ==
Toohil was born on October 1, 1979, in Drums, Pennsylvania, and graduated from Hazleton Area High School in 1998. She majored in political science and sociology at Northeastern University, graduating in 2003. Toohil earned a Juris Doctor from Penn State Dickinson Law in 2008.

== Career ==
In 2010, Toohil was elected to represent the 116th District in the Pennsylvania House of Representatives. She defeated then-House Majority Leader Todd Eachus to gain the seat. During the 2019-2020 legislative session, Toohil served as a member of the House Children and Youth (vice chair), Government Oversight, Human Services, Judiciary, Professional Licensure and Rules committees.

In 2021, legislation Toohil sponsored was enacted that prohibits life and health insurance companies from discriminating against living organ donors in Pennsylvania.

Toohil is a co-founder of "Brandon's Forever Home," a Pennsylvania charity that assists foster children.

Toohil is against legalizing adult-use cannabis in Pennsylvania, citing concerns for a potential negative impact on children.

In 2021, Toohil ran for the Luzerne County Court of Common Pleas. She was successful, and effectively resigned from the House of Representatives on December 31, 2022. She was sworn in as a judge on January 3, 2022.

== Personal life ==
In 2012, an anonymous person posted videos allegedly of Toohil at a party smoking marijuana as blackmail against her anti-marijuana legalization stance. Pennsylvania State Police launched an investigation into the matter.

Toohil formerly dated Delaware County Republican representative Nicholas Miccarelli III. In 2018, Toohil stated that Miccarelli made threats against her and sexually abused her during and after their relationship. She was granted a restraining order against Miccarelli in 2018. Miccarelli has been accused by other women of sexual harassment leading to the revocation of his security privileges at the state capitol and his retirement from the legislature in 2018.

== Electoral history ==
2010 Pennsylvania House of Representatives election, District 116
| Party | Candidate | Votes | % |
|---|---|---|---|
| Republican | Tarah Toohil | 9,702 | 54.84 |
| Democratic | Todd A. Eachus (incumbent) | 7,967 | 45.03 |
| Write-in | | 24 | 0.14 |
| Total votes | | 17,693 | 100.00 |

2012 Pennsylvania House of Representatives election, District 116
| Party | Candidate | Votes | % |
|---|---|---|---|
| Republican | Tarah Toohil (incumbent) | 14,671 | 67.15 |
| Democratic | Ransom S. Young | 7,157 | 32.76 |
| Write-in | | 19 | 0.09 |
| Total votes | | 21,847 | 100.00 |

2014 Pennsylvania House of Representatives election, District 116
| Party | Candidate | Votes | % |
|---|---|---|---|
| Republican | Tarah Toohil (incumbent) | 11,710 | 98.65 |
| Write-in | | 160 | 1.35 |
| Total votes | | 11,870 | 100.00 |

2016 Pennsylvania House of Representatives election, District 116
| Party | Candidate | Votes | % |
|---|---|---|---|
| Republican | Tarah Toohil (incumbent) | 16,695 | 70.12 |
| Democratic | Gary Gregory | 7,089 | 29.77 |
| Write-in | | 25 | 0.11 |
| Total votes | | 23,809 | 100.00 |

2018 Pennsylvania House of Representatives election, District 116
| Party | Candidate | Votes | % |
|---|---|---|---|
| Republican | Tarah Toohil (incumbent) | 14,996 | 97.94 |
| Write-in | | 316 | 2.06 |
| Total votes | | 15,312 | 100.00 |

2020 Pennsylvania House of Representatives election, District 116
| Party | Candidate | Votes | % |
|---|---|---|---|
| Republican | Tarah Toohil (incumbent) | 19,134 | 72.31 |
| Democratic | Todd A. Eachus | 7,313 | 27.64 |
| Write-in | John Chura | 1 | >0.01 |
| Write-in | Scattered | 13 | 0.05 |
| Total votes | | 26,462 | 100.00 |

2021 Luzerne County Court of Common Pleas Republican primary election, 11th District
| Party | Candidate | Votes | % |
|---|---|---|---|
| Republican | Stefanie Salavantis | 16,934 | 37.18 |
| Republican | Tarah Toohil | 13,379 | 29.38 |
| Republican | Jim Bobek | 6,030 | 13.24 |
| Republican | Alexandra Kokura Kravitz | 4,634 | 10.17 |
| Republican | Laura Dennis | 4,528 | 9.94 |
| Write-in | | 40 | 0.09 |
| Total votes | | 45,545 | 100.00 |

2021 Luzerne County Court of Common Pleas Democratic primary election, 11th District
| Party | Candidate | Votes | % |
|---|---|---|---|
| Democratic | Stefanie Salavantis | 14,628 | 29.31 |
| Democratic | Alexandra Kokura Kravitz | 10,790 | 21.62 |
| Democratic | Jim Bobek | 10,321 | 20.68 |
| Democratic | Laura Dennis | 7,951 | 15.93 |
| Democratic | Tarah Toohil | 6,165 | 12.35 |
| | Scattered | 47 | 0.09 |
| Total votes | | 49,902 | 100.00 |

2021 Luzerne County Court of Common Pleas election, 11th District
| Party | Candidate | Votes | % |
|---|---|---|---|
| Democratic/Republican | Stefanie Salavantis | 42,571 | 40.79 |
| Republican | Tarah Toohil | 32,378 | 31.02 |
| Democratic | Alexandra Kokura Kravitz | 29,151 | 27.93 |
| Write-in | | 261 | 0.25 |
| Write-in | | 16 | 0.02 |
| Total votes | | 104,377 | 100.00 |
