= Pennsylvania House of Representatives, District 116 =

American legislative district

Pennsylvania's 116th State House of Representatives district
Representative
Dane Watro; R–McAdoo

The 116th Pennsylvania House of Representatives District is located in Luzerne County and Schuylkill County and includes the following areas:

Luzerne County

- Hazleton
- Hazle Township
- West Hazleton

Schuylkill County

- East Union Township
- Kline Township
- Mahanoy City
- Mahanoy Township
- McAdoo
- North Union Township
- Ringtown
- Shenandoah
- Union Township

== Representatives ==
Representative	Party	Years	District home	Note
Prior to 1969, seats were apportioned by county.
William T. Bachman	Democrat	1969 – 1970		
James J. Ustynoski	Republican	1971 – 1976		
Ronald Gatski	Democrat	1977 – 1980		
Correale F. Stevens	Republican	1981 – 1988		
Thomas B. Stish	Democrat	1989 – 1996		
Todd A. Eachus	Democrat	1997 – 2010	Butler Township	
Tarah Toohil	Republican	2011 – 2022	Butler Township	
Robert Schnee	Republican	2022 – 2023		
Dane Watro	Republican	2023 – present	Mahanoy City	
