= Todd Eachus =

American politician

Todd A. Eachus

Member of the Pennsylvania House of Representatives from the 116th district
- In office January 7, 1997 – November 30, 2010
- Preceded by: Thomas Stish
- Succeeded by: Tarah Toohil

Majority Leader of the Pennsylvania House of Representatives
- In office January 6, 2009 – November 30, 2010
- Preceded by: Bill DeWeese
- Succeeded by: Frank Dermody

Personal details
- Born: September 26, 1962 (age 64) Harrisburg, Pennsylvania, U.S.
- Party: Democratic
- Spouse: Ellen Kusiak-Eachus
- Education: Pitzer College (BA)
- Occupation: Business owner

Todd A. Eachus (born September 26, 1962) is an American politician who served as a member of the Pennsylvania House of Representatives. He represented the 116th District (Luzerne County) from 1997 until 2010. Eachus represented most of lower Luzerne County, including Hazleton, Butler Township, and Foster Township. He previously served as the Majority Leader of the House.

== Early life and education ==
Eachus was born in Harrisburg, Pennsylvania to Etta May and Sonny Achey. He earned a Bachelor of Arts degree in political science from Pitzer College.

== Career ==
Responding to the kids for cash scandal in his district in 2009, Eachus sponsored House Bill 1648 which established the Interbranch Commission on Juvenile Justice in July 2009. The commission consists of eleven members, appointed from each branch of government in Pennsylvania, with four members chosen by the judicial branch, four by the legislature and three by the governor.

He was a "key driving force" in shepherding Ed Rendell's healthcare agenda through the Pennsylvania House of Representatives.

Eachus was defeated by Tarah Toohil for re-election in 2010. Toohil resoundly defeated Eachus in again in 2020.
