= James Ustynoski =

American politician

James J. Ustynoski

Member of the Pennsylvania House of Representatives from the 116th district
- In office January 5, 1971 – November 30, 1976
- Preceded by: William Bachman
- Succeeded by: Ronald Gatski

Personal details
- Born: May 31, 1932 West Hazleton, Pennsylvania
- Died: November 4, 2000 (aged 68) Wilkes-Barre, Pennsylvania
- Party: Republican

James J. Ustynoski (May 31, 1932 – November 4, 2000) was a former Republican member of the Pennsylvania House of Representatives.
