= William Bachman =

American politician (1908–1993)

William T. Bachman

Member of the Pennsylvania House of Representatives from the 116th district
- In office January 7, 1969 – November 30, 1970
- Preceded by: District Created
- Succeeded by: James Ustynoski

Member of the Pennsylvania House of Representatives from the Luzerne County district
- In office 1961–1968

Personal details
- Born: January 9, 1908
- Died: May 12, 1993 (aged 85)
- Party: Democratic
- Spouse: Rose Bachman

William T. Bachman (January 9, 1908 – May 12, 1993) was a Democratic member of the Pennsylvania House of Representatives.
