= Luzerne County Council =

County council in Pennsylvania, United States

Type
- Type: Unicameral
- Term limits: 3 consecutive terms, resets after leaving office

History
- Founded: 2012
- Preceded by: Board of County Commissioners

Leadership
- Chair: Jimmy Sabatino, Democratic
- Vice Chair: Brittany Stephenson, Democratic

Structure
- Seats: 11
- Political groups: Majority Party; Democratic: 8 seats: Minority Party; Republican: 3 seats
- Length of term: 4 years

Elections
- Voting system: Plurality-at-large voting
- Last election: November 4, 2025 (5 seats)
- Next election: Primary: May 18, 2027; General: November 2, 2027 (6 seats)

Meeting place
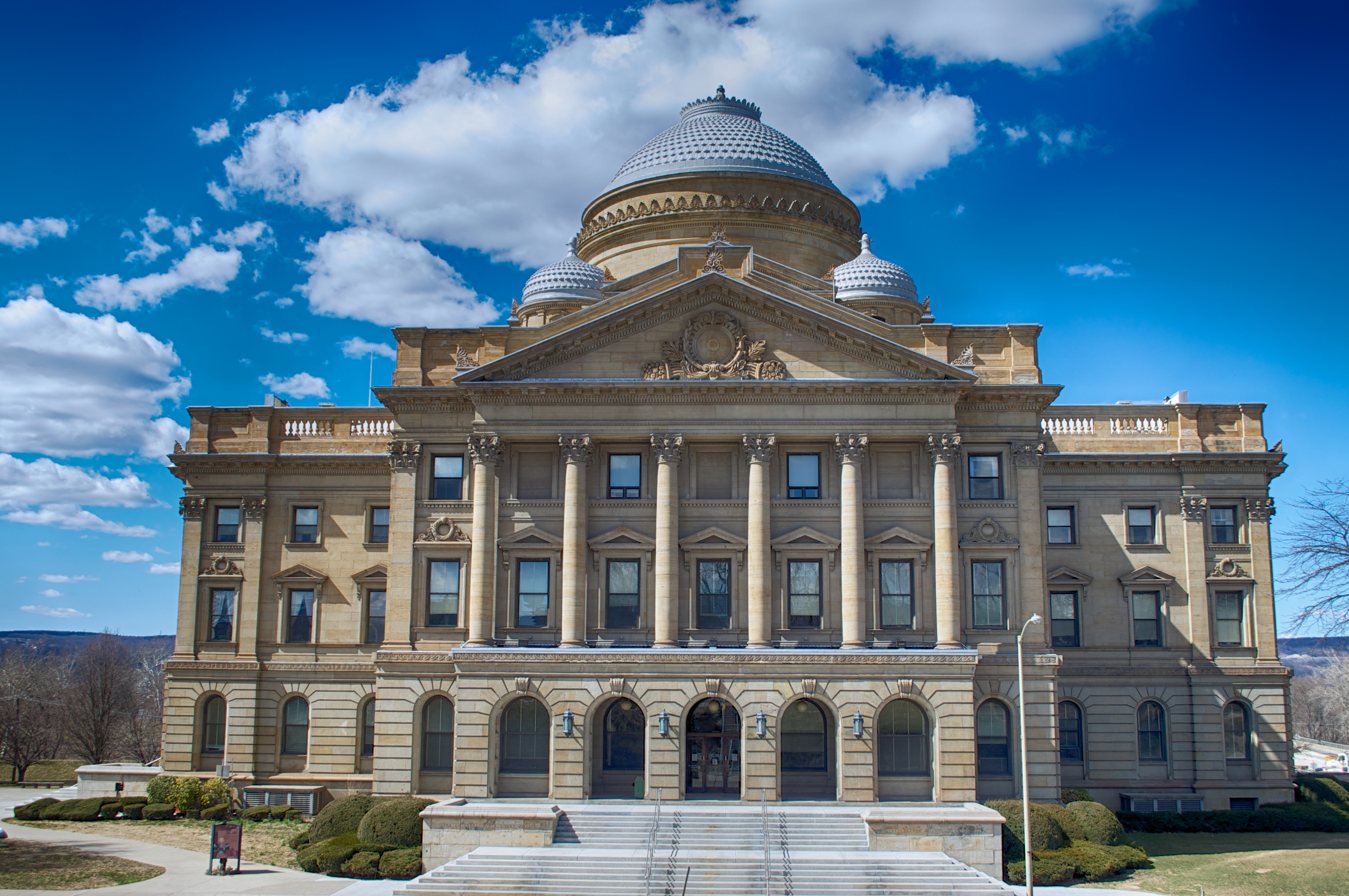
- Luzerne County Courthouse in Wilkes-Barre, Luzerne County, Pennsylvania

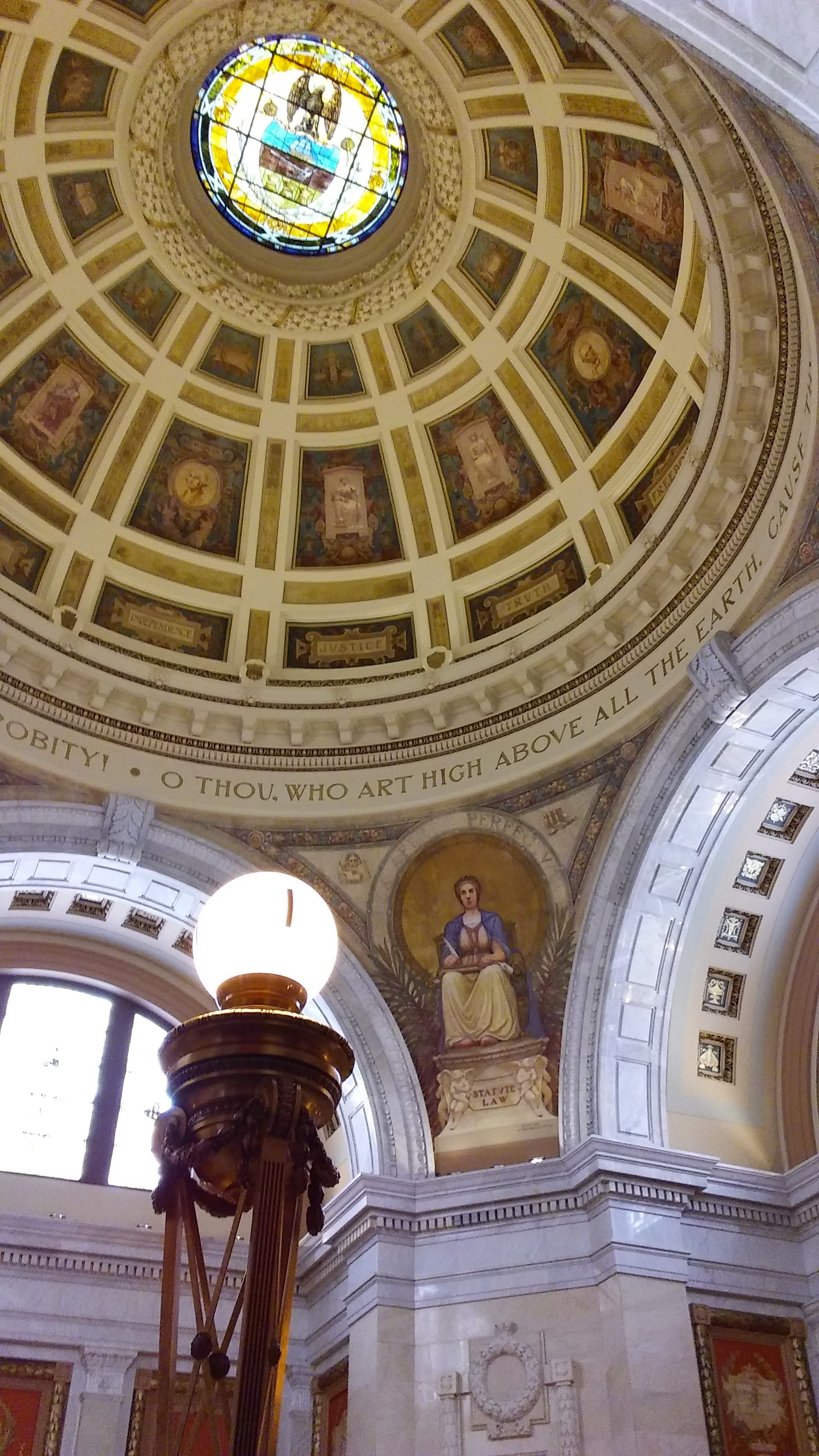
Inside the county courthouse

The Luzerne County Council is the governing body of Luzerne County, Pennsylvania. The council meets at the Luzerne County Courthouse in Wilkes-Barre. There are eleven members on the assembly (eight Democrats and three Republicans). The chair is both the highest-ranking officer on the council and the head of county government for ceremonial purposes. When the group is not in session, the officer's duties often include acting as its representative to the outside world and its spokesperson. The current chair is Jimmy Sabatino.

== History ==
Luzerne County voters rejected home rule proposals in the past (once in 1974 and again in 2003). However, from 2008 to 2010, corruption plagued county government. Three county judges, a county commissioner, a clerk of courts, a deputy chief clerk, and a director of human resources faced criminal charges. These events persuaded the voters of Luzerne County to adopt a new form of government. On Tuesday, November 2, 2010, a home rule charter was adopted by a margin of 51,413 to 41,639.

The following year (in 2011), the first election for the new government was held. On Monday, January 2, 2012, the previous government (the board of county commissioners) was abolished and replaced with the new form of government (council–manager government). The first members of the Luzerne County Council were sworn in that same day. The first council chair was Jim Bobeck.

In 2025, voters were presented with a proposed charter amendment to reduce the number of seats on county council from 11 to 9 and make other changes to council government, including giving council more direct control over the elections board. The amendment was broadly rejected by voters: nearly 61% of voters and 179 out of 186 precincts rejected the changes.

== Election process ==
The Luzerne County Council is elected by the voters of the county. Nearly half the council is up for election every two years. It rotates between five and six seats. Each council member is elected at-large (to a four-year term). They are limited to three consecutive terms. In the May primary, the major political parties (Democratic and Republican) select their top candidates for the general election. For example, those who place in the top five or six become the nominees of their party. Third party (or independent) candidates may also join the race. In the November general election, all political parties/candidates square off on the same ballot. Those who place in the top five or six will be elected or re-elected to council.

== Current council members ==
The following members have been duly elected to county council by the voters of Luzerne County:

Council member	Tenure	Party	Position
Jimmy Sabatino	2024–present	Democratic	Chair
Brittany Stephenson	2024–present	Democratic	Vice Chair
Patty Krushnowski	2024–present	Democratic	
Joanna Bryn Smith	2024–present	Democratic	
Denise Williams	2026–present	Democratic	
Dawn Simmons	2026–present	Democratic	
Steven Coslett	2026–present	Democratic	
Chris Belles	2026–present	Democratic	
John Lombardo	2022–present	Republican	
Lee Ann McDermott	2020–present	Republican	
Harry Haas	2012–2022, 2024–present	Republican	

== List of council chairs ==
The following chairs were elected by council:

	List of council chairs	Tenure	Party	Notes
1	Jim Bobeck	2012	Democratic	
2	Tim McGinley	2012–2014	Democratic	
3	Rick Morelli	2014–2015	Republican	
4	Linda McClosky Houck	2015–2018	Democratic	First female chair
5	Tim McGinley	2018–2022	Democratic	
6	Kendra Vough	2022–2024	Republican	
7	John Lombardo	2024–2026	Republican	
8	Jimmy Sabatino	2026–present	Democratic	

== Former council members ==
Name	Tenure	Party	Notes
Elaine Maddon Curry	2012–2014	Democratic	She did not seek re-election in 2013.
James Bobeck	2012–2016	Democratic	Bobeck served as the first council chair in 2012. He did not seek re-election in 2015.
Kathleen M. Dobash	2014–2018	Republican	She did not seek re-election in 2017.
Eileen M. Sorokas	2014–2018	Democratic	She did not seek re-election in 2017.
Rick Williams	2012–2018	Independent	Williams did not seek re-election in 2017. He remains the only independent councilor.
Edward A. Brominski	2012–2019	Democratic	He resigned in January 2019 due to health issues. Council appointed Patrick Bilbow to serve out the remainder of his term.
Eugene L. Kelleher	2012–2014, 2016–2019	Republican	Kelleher lost re-election in 2013. He won a second non-consecutive term in 2015. Kelleher resigned in July 2019 due to relocating to Lancaster County. Former Councilman Rick Morelli was appointed by council to serve out the remainder of Kelleher's term.
Patrick M. Bilbow	2019–2020	Democratic	In February 2019, council appointed Bilbow to serve out the remainder of Edward Brominski’s term. He lost re-election in 2019.
Rick Morelli	2012–2016, 2019–2020	Republican	Morelli served as the third council chair from 2014 to 2015. He did not seek re-election in 2015. In August 2019, council appointed Morelli to serve out the remainder of Eugene Kelleher’s term.
Stephen A. Urban	2012–2020	Democratic	He did not seek re-election in 2019.
Jane Walsh-Waitkus	2016–2020	Democratic	She lost re-election in 2019.
Walter L. Griffith, Jr.	2020–2022	Republican	Griffith vacated his seat after becoming Luzerne County Controller in 2022.
Linda McClosky Houck	2012–2022	Democratic	Houck served as the fourth council chair from 2015 to 2018. She was ineligible to pursue a fourth consecutive term due to term limits.
Sheila Saidman	2018–2022	Democratic	She lost re-election in 2021.
Robert Schnee	2016–2022	Republican	Schnee vacated his seat after winning a special election for the Pennsylvania House of Representatives in 2022.
Matthew Vough	2018–2022	Democratic	He lost re-election in 2021.
Carl Bienias	2022–2024	Republican	Bienias was appointed by council in 2022 to serve the remainder of Walter Griffith's term. He lost his party's nomination in May 2023.
Tim McGinley	2012–2024	Democratic	McGinley twice served as council chair from 2012 to 2014, and again from 2018 to 2022. He was ineligible to pursue a fourth consecutive term due to term limits.
Matthew Mitchell	2022–2024	Republican	Mitchell was appointed by council in 2022 to serve the remainder of Robert Schnee's term, who vacated his seat after winning a special election for the Pennsylvania House of Representatives. Mitchell lost re-election in 2023.
Stephen J. Urban	2012–2016, 2020–2024	Republican	Urban served two non-consecutive terms. He lost re-election in 2015 and again in 2023.
Kendra M. Vough	2020–2024	Republican	She served as the sixth council chair from 2022 to 2024. Kendra Vough did not seek re-election in 2023.
Brian Thornton	2022–2026	Republican	Defeated in the 2025 general election.
Gregory S. Wolovich	2022–2026	Republican	Defeated in the 2025 general election.
Kevin Lescavage	2022–2026	Republican	Defeated in the 2025 primary election.
Chris R. Perry	2018–2026	Republican	Did not run for re-election.
