= List of cities in Pennsylvania =

Map of the United States with Pennsylvania highlighted

There are 56 municipalities classified as cities (Pennsylvania German: Schtedt, singular Schtadt) in the U.S. Commonwealth of Pennsylvania. Each city is further classified based on population, with Philadelphia being of the first class, Pittsburgh of the second class, Scranton of the second class A, and the remaining 53 cities being of the third class.

While the default form of government for third class cities is the Third Class City Code, only 18 cities still use this form of government. The City of Parker is the only city that still operates under a special act, and has a weak mayor-council form of government. All three cities not of the third class, along with 23 third class cities, have adopted home rule charters, which give the cities broader powers to manage their affairs. When a city adopts a home rule charter, it does not lose its status as a city nor its classification.

Two cities have adopted optional plans under the same law. From 1957 to 1972, third class cities were able to adopt optional charters. Nine remain in effect. Cities that operate under home rule charters, optional plans, or optional charters are also found in the List of Pennsylvania municipalities and counties with home rule charters, optional charters, or optional plans.

Home rule municipalities that are styled as cities but not classified as cities are not included below.

== Cities gallery ==
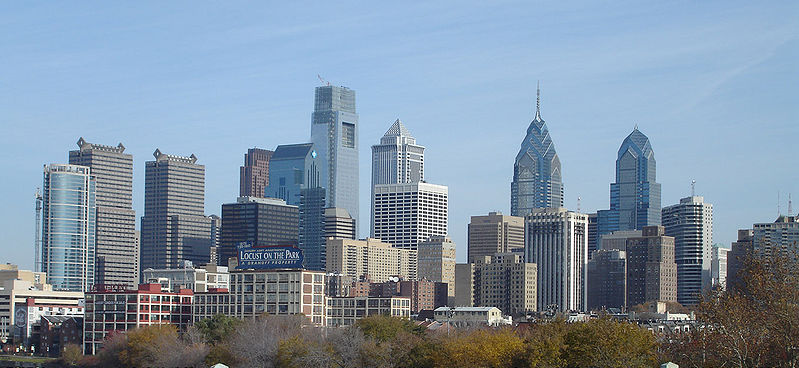
Philadelphia, the largest city in Pennsylvania and sixth-largest city in the United States with a population of 1.6 million

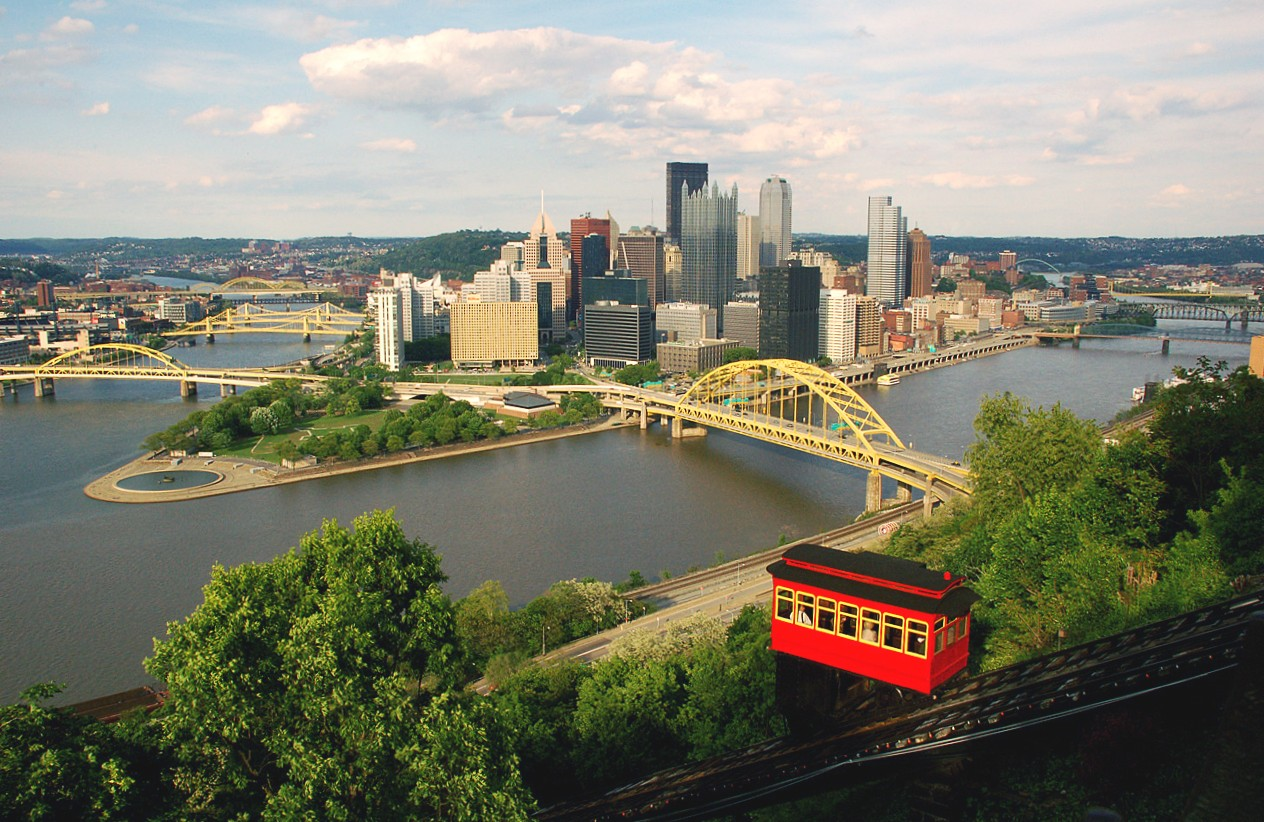
Pittsburgh, the second-largest city in Pennsylvania

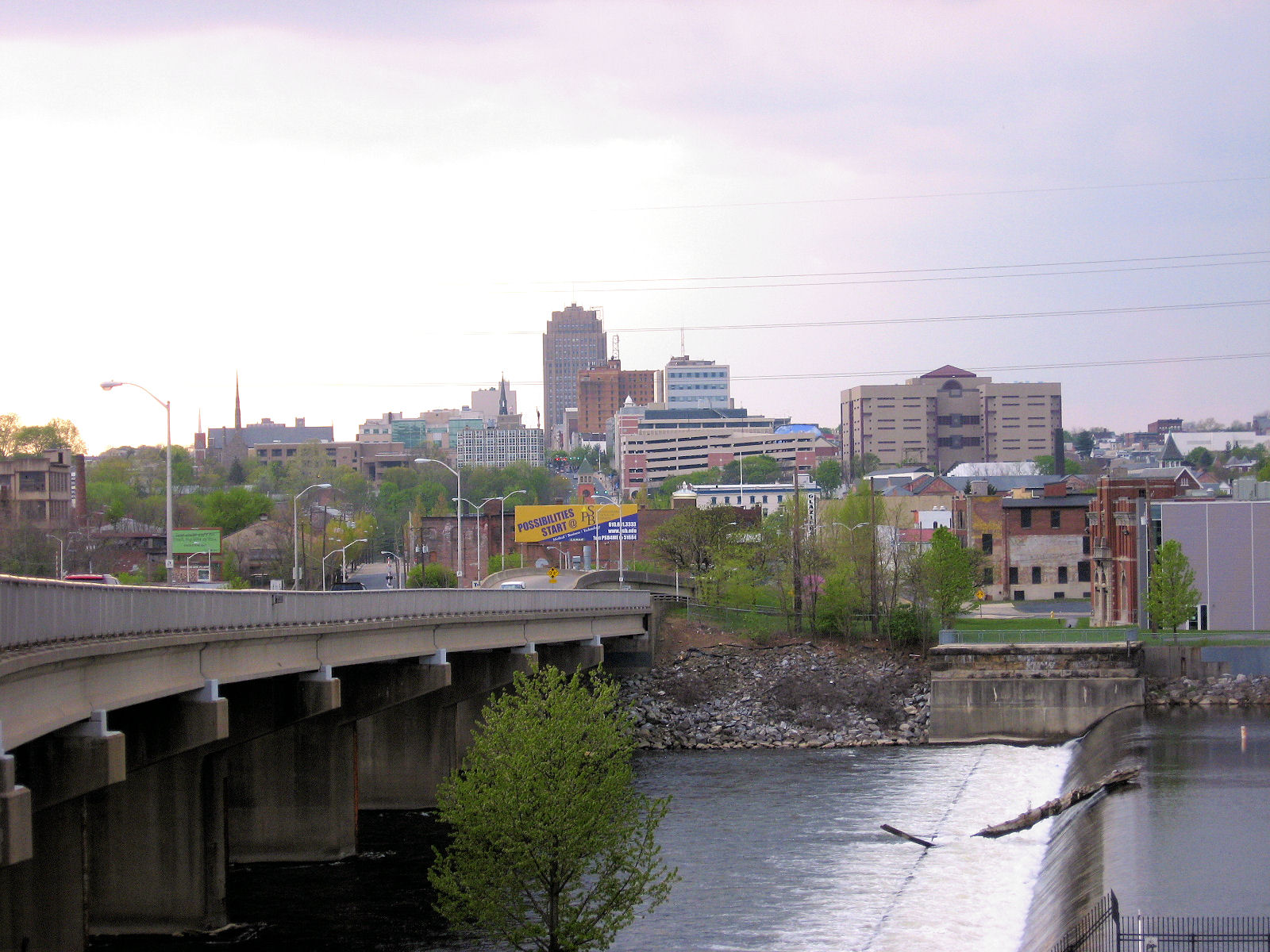
Allentown, the third-largest city in Pennsylvania

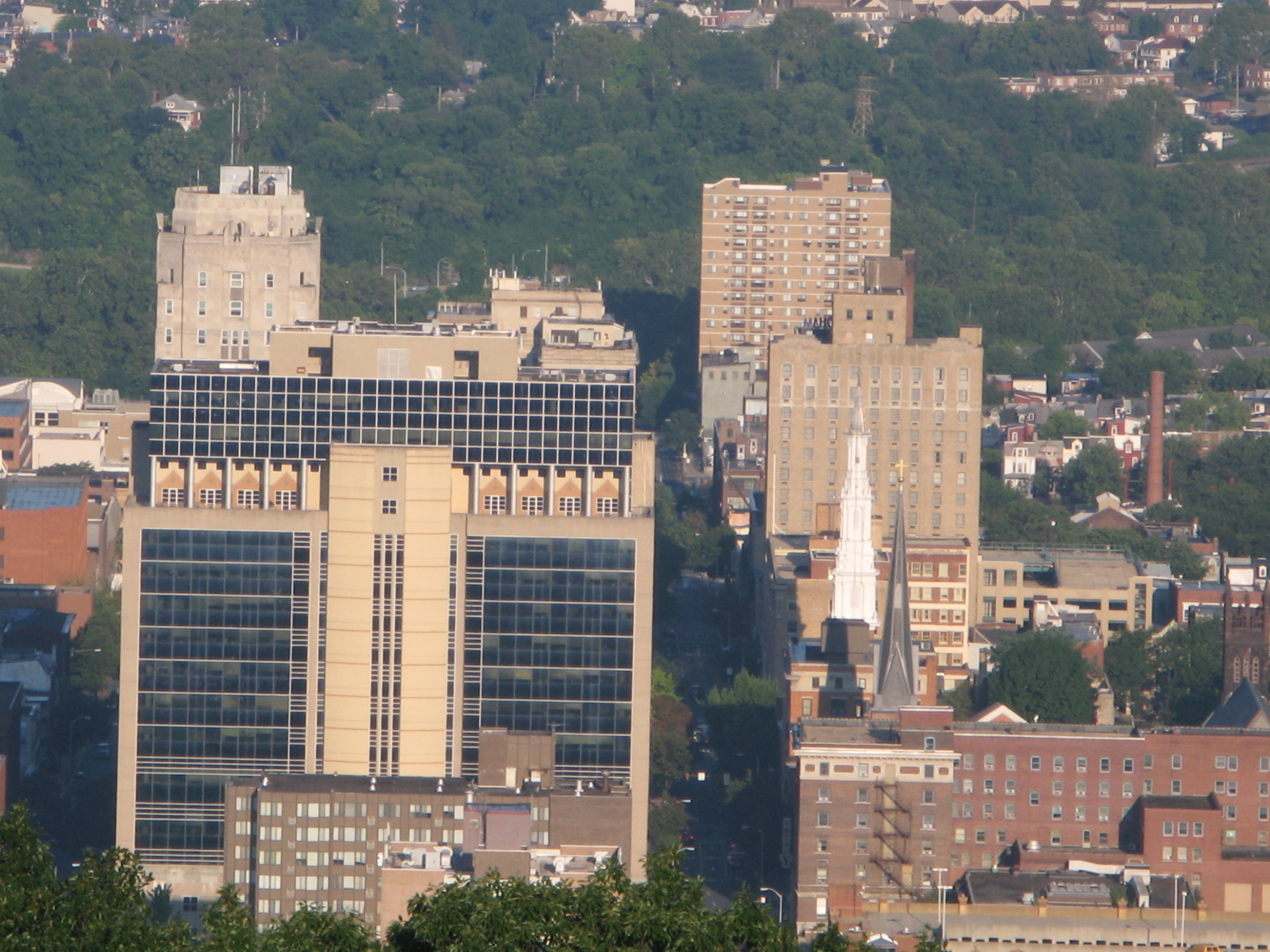
Reading, the fourth-largest city in Pennsylvania

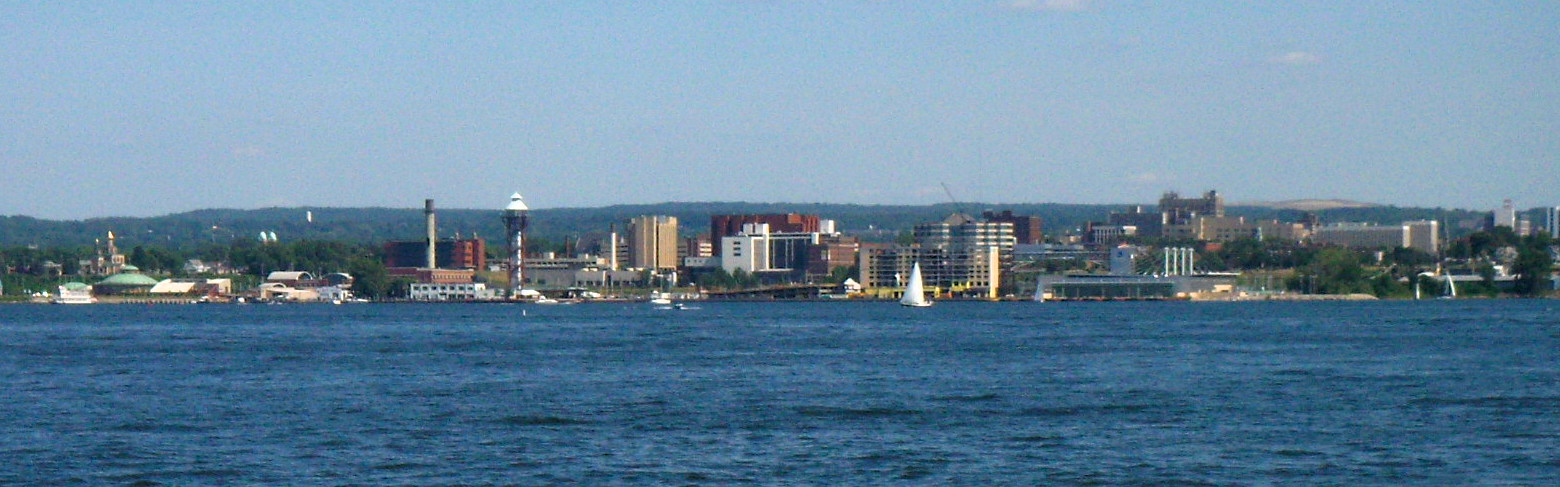
Erie, the fifth-largest city in Pennsylvania

== List of cities in Pennsylvania ==
† County Seat

Name	Type	County	Class	Population (2020 Census)	Incorporation date (as city)	Area (sq miles)	Area (km^{2})
Aliquippa	City	Beaver	Third	9,238	1987	4.19	10.9
Allentown†	City	Lehigh	Third	125,845	1867	17.55	45.5
Altoona	City	Blair	Third	43,963	1868	9.91	25.7
Arnold	City	Westmoreland	Third	4,772	1939	0.73	1.9
Beaver Falls	City	Beaver	Third	9,005	1928	2.13	5.5
Bethlehem	City	Lehigh; Northampton	Third	75,781	1917	19.10	49.5
Bradford	City	McKean	Third	7,849	1879	3.35	8.7
Butler†	City	Butler	Third	13,502	1918	2.72	7.0
Carbondale	City	Lackawanna	Third	8,828	1851	3.24	8.4
Chester	City	Delaware	Third	32,605	1866	4.84	12.5
Clairton	City	Allegheny	Third	6,181	1922	2.79	7.2
Coatesville	City	Chester	Third	13,350	1915	1.81	4.7
Connellsville	City	Fayette	Third	7,031	1911	2.18	5.6
Corry	City	Erie	Third	6,210	1866	5.99	15.5
DuBois	City	Clearfield	Third	7,510	1914	3.18	8.2
Duquesne	City	Allegheny	Third	5,254	1918	1.82	4.7
Easton†	City	Northampton	Third	28,127	1887	4.07	10.5
Erie†	City	Erie	Third	94,831	1851	19.08	49.4
Farrell	City	Mercer	Third	4,258	1932	1.27	3.3
Franklin†	City	Venango	Third	6,077	1868	4.68	12.1
Greensburg†	City	Westmoreland	Third	14,976	1928	4.06	10.5
Harrisburg†	City	Dauphin	Third	50,135	1860	8.13	21.1
Hazleton	City	Luzerne	Third	29,963	1891	6.01	15.6
Hermitage	City	Mercer	Third	16,230	1976	29.23	75.7
Jeannette	City	Westmoreland	Third	8,780	1938	2.39	6.2
Johnstown	City	Cambria	Third	18,411	1889	5.89	15.3
Lancaster†	City	Lancaster	Third	58,039	1818	7.23	18.7
Lebanon†	City	Lebanon	Third	26,814	1885	4.17	10.8
Lock Haven†	City	Clinton	Third	8,108	1870	2.50	6.5
Lower Burrell	City	Westmoreland	Third	11,758	1959	11.26	29.2
McKeesport	City	Allegheny	Third	17,727	1891	5.5	14
Meadville†	City	Crawford	Third	13,050	1866	4.38	11.3
Monessen	City	Westmoreland	Third	6,876	1921	2.89	7.5
Monongahela	City	Washington	Third	4,159	1873	1.98	5.1
Nanticoke	City	Luzerne	Third	10,628	1926	3.49	9.0
New Castle†	City	Lawrence	Third	21,926	1869	8.31	21.5
New Kensington	City	Westmoreland	Third	12,170	1934	3.95	10.2
Oil City	City	Venango	Third	9,613	1871	4.49	11.6
Parker	City	Armstrong	Third	695	1873	0.87	2.3
Philadelphia†	City	Philadelphia	First	1,603,797	1701	134.1	347
Pittsburgh†	City	Allegheny	Second	302,971	1816	55.37	143.4
Pittston	City	Luzerne	Third	7,591	1894	1.55	4.0
Pottsville†	City	Schuylkill	Third	13,346	1911	4.89	12.7
Reading†	City	Berks	Third	95,112	1847	9.88	25.6
St. Marys	City	Elk	Third	12,738	1992	99.32	257.2
Scranton†	City	Lackawanna	Second A	76,328	1866	25.31	65.6
Shamokin	City	Northumberland	Third	6,942	1949	0.83	2.1
Sharon	City	Mercer	Third	13,147	1917	3.77	9.8
Sunbury†	City	Northumberland	Third	9,719	1920	2.06	5.3
Titusville	City	Crawford	Third	5,262	1866	2.90	7.5
Uniontown†	City	Fayette	Third	9,984	1864	2.04	5.3
Warren†	City	Warren	Third	9,404	1832	2.91	7.5
Washington†	City	Washington	Third	13,176	1924	2.95	7.6
Wilkes-Barre†	City	Luzerne	Third	44,328	1871	6.98	18.1
Williamsport†	City	Lycoming	Third	27,754	1866	8.73	22.6
York†	City	York	Third	44,800	1887	5.29	13.7

== See also ==
- List of counties in Pennsylvania
- List of municipalities in Pennsylvania
- List of Pennsylvania Municipalities and Counties with Home Rule Charters, Optional Charters, or Optional Plans
- List of townships in Pennsylvania
