= Correale Stevens =

American judge

Justice of the Pennsylvania Supreme Court
- In office July 30, 2013 – January 4, 2016
- Appointed by: Tom Corbett
- Preceded by: Joan Orie Melvin
- Succeeded by: Christine Donohue

Judge of the Superior Court of Pennsylvania
- In office January 4, 1998 – July 30, 2013
- Succeeded by: Patricia H. Jenkins

Member of the Pennsylvania House of Representatives from the 116th district
- In office January 6, 1981 – November 30, 1988
- Preceded by: Ronald Gatski
- Succeeded by: Thomas Stish

Personal details
- Born: October 6, 1946 (age 79) Hazleton, Pennsylvania, U.S.
- Party: Republican
- Education: Pennsylvania State University (BA, JD)

Correale F. Stevens (born October 6, 1946) is an American attorney, politician, and jurist who served as an associate justice of the Supreme Court of Pennsylvania from June 2013 to January 2016.

Stevens previously served as a Republican member of the Pennsylvania House of Representatives.

== Early life and education ==
Stevens was born in Hazleton, Pennsylvania. He earned a Bachelor of Arts degree from Pennsylvania State University and a Juris Doctor from the Penn State Dickinson Law. He completed a summer program at the University of California, Santa Barbara.

== Career ==
After graduating from law school, Stevens established his own legal practice in Hazleton, Pennsylvania. He then served as Hazelton City Solicitor and District Attorney of Luzerne County, Pennsylvania.

He served as a member of the Pennsylvania House of Representatives from 1981 to 1988.

Stevens was elected to the Superior Court of Pennsylvania in 1997. He also worked as an instructor at Penn State Hazleton.

Stevens was appointed to the Supreme Court of Pennsylvania in 2013 after the resignation of Joan Orie Melvin.

In May 2015, he was defeated in the Republican primary for election to a full term.
