= Stephen A. Urban =

Member of the Luzerne County Council
- In office January 2, 2012 – January 6, 2020
- Preceded by: Position established

Member of the Luzerne County Board of Commissioners
- In office 2000 – January 2, 2012
- Preceded by: Joseph "Red" Jones
- Succeeded by: Position abolished

Personal details
- Born: October 27, 1952 (age 73) Hanover Township, Luzerne County, Pennsylvania, U.S.
- Party: Democratic (since 2010)
- Other political affiliations: Republican (until 2010)
- Spouse: Linda Stets
- Children: 2
- Education: King's College (B.A.); Golden Gate University (M.P.A.); U.S. Naval War College (M.A.)
- Alma mater: Meyers High School

Military service
- Allegiance: United States
- Branch/service: United States Army
- Rank: Lieutenant Colonel
- Battles/wars: Vietnam War; Gulf War
- Awards: Legion of Merit; Bronze Star

Stephen Anthony Urban (born October 27, 1952) is an American politician and former military officer who served as a commissioner of Luzerne County, Pennsylvania from 2000 to 2012 and later as a member of the Luzerne County Council from 2012 to 2020.

== Early life and education ==
Urban was born on October 27, 1952, in Hanover Township, Luzerne County, Pennsylvania to parents Joseph and Theresa Urban. He grew up in the Rolling Mill Hill section of Wilkes-Barre and graduated from Meyers High School. In 1977, Urban earned a Bachelor of Arts degree in criminal justice from King's College in Wilkes-Barre and in 1980 received a Master of Public Administration from Golden Gate University in San Francisco. He earned an additional Master of Arts degree in national security and strategic studies from the U.S. Naval War College in 1992.

== Career ==
Urban was in the U.S. Army for 24 years, serving in the Vietnam War and the Gulf War, before retiring at the rank of lieutenant colonel. He is a recipient of the Legion of Merit and the Bronze Star.

In 1996, Urban ran against incumbent U.S. Representative Paul Kanjorski to represent Pennsylvania's 11th congressional district. The Times Leader reported in February that Urban, thus far, was running as a "stealth candidate," with little name recognition or publicity. His low profile campaign would continue into August, when a Project Vote Smart profile made much of Urban's policy positions public for the first time. The Times Leader reported that Urban and Kanjorski's political positions were very similar. Both candidates opposed NAFTA, gun control, and foreign aid to Russia, but differed on immigration and budget issues. During the campaign Urban voiced support for a constitutional amendment outlawing flag burning, something Kanjorski also supported. He also endorsed the idea of a constitutional amendment to mandate balanced budgets and voiced his opposition to abortion, except when the mother's life is at risk. Urban would ultimately lose to Kanjorski; the Times Leader described him as being "trounced by the incumbent." Urban's two subsequent congressional campaigns in 1998 and 2000 were likewise unsuccessful in unseating Kanjorski.

Starting in 2000, Urban served as an elected county commissioner of Luzerne County, Pennsylvania after defeating incumbent commissioner Joseph "Red" Jones in the 1999 election. Urban was reelected in 2003 and 2007. As the lone Republican commissioner for most of his tenure, Urban used his status as minority commissioner to criticize Luzerne County's machine politics.

In 2010, ran in the Republican primary elections for lieutenant governor of Pennsylvania and the Pennsylvania Senate. Urban lost the primary for lieutenant governor, finishing second to last, but won the nomination for the 14th Senate District unopposed. He would later lose to Democrat John Yudichak in the general election. Following his loss to Yudichak, Urban changed his party registration to Democratic. He blamed "double dealing" on the part of the local Republican Party for his switch. According to Urban, local Republican officials openly campaigned for Yudichak and the party's campaign arm failed to adequately support him, causing him to lose the election.

After Luzerne County's commissioner government was abolished, Urban, who had opposed the change in government because of the lack of an elected executive, was elected to the newly created Luzerne County Council in 2011. The same year he ran concurrently for magisterial district judge, but lost the primary election. In 2013, Urban was also defeated in the primary for county controller. He was reelected to county council in 2015. In 2019, Urban decided to not seek re-election.

== Personal life ==
Urban is previously divorced and has two adult children. His current wife is Linda Stets. Urban's son, Stephen J. Urban, was also a Luzerne County councilman from 2012 to 2016 and 2020 to 2024.
