= List of Pennsylvania municipalities and counties with home rule charters, optional charters, or optional plans =

This is a list of Pennsylvania municipalities and counties with home rule charters, optional charters, or optional plans, including municipalities with home rule charters, optional charters, or optional plans.

== Home rule municipalities ==
Most municipalities in Pennsylvania must follow state law except where the state has expressly given jurisdiction to the municipality, and are therefore subject to the Third Class City Code, the Borough Code, the First Class Township Code, the Second Class Township Code, or other acts for sui generis municipalities.

Home rule municipalities in Pennsylvania enjoy the opposite situation (i.e., they may govern themselves except where expressly forbidden by state law), and are governed according to their unique home rule charter rather than one of the above codes. While most home rule charter municipalities continue to reference their previous forms of government in their corporate names, they may also adopt a new corporate name that references a different form of government, or that omits the form from the name altogether.

Name	Type (Municipal charter)	Type (State classification)	Class (State classification)	County	Effective Date
Allentown	City	City	Third	Lehigh	January 6, 1997
Altoona	City	City	Third	Blair	January 5, 2015
Beaver Falls	City	City	Third	Beaver	January 1, 2022
Bellevue	Borough	Borough	N/A	Allegheny	January 5, 1976
Bethel Park	Municipality	Borough	N/A	Allegheny	January 2, 1978
Braddock	Borough	Borough	N/A	Allegheny	January 4, 2021
Bradford Woods	Borough	Borough	N/A	Allegheny	January 6, 1975
Bryn Athyn	Borough	Borough	N/A	Montgomery	January 2, 1978
Cambridge Springs	Borough	Borough	N/A	Crawford	January 5, 1976
Carbondale	City	City	Third	Lackawanna	January 2, 1977
Carlisle	Borough	Borough	N/A	Cumberland	January 1, 2016
Chalfont	Borough	Borough	N/A	Bucks	January 5, 1976
Cheltenham	Township	Township	First	Montgomery	January 1, 1977
Chester	City	City	Third	Delaware	January 7, 1981
Chester	Township	Township	Second	Delaware	July 2, 1990
Clairton	Municipality	City	Third	Allegheny	January 1, 1990
Coatesville	City	City	Third	Chester	January 7, 1980
Concord	Township	Township	Second	Delaware	January 1, 2017
Easton	City	City	Third	Northampton	January 2, 2008
Edinboro	Borough	Borough	N/A	Erie	January 5, 1976
Elk	Township	Township	Second	Chester	January 1, 1975
Farrell	City	City	Third	Mercer	January 5, 1976
Ferguson	Township	Township	Second	Centre	January 5, 1976
Franklin	City	City	Third	Venago	January 5, 1976
Grant	Township	Township	Second	Indiana	November 21, 2015
Green Tree	Borough	Borough	N/A	Allegheny	January 6, 1975
Greensburg	City	City	Third	Westmoreland	January 2, 1989
Greenville	Town	Borough	N/A	Mercer	January 1, 2020
Hampton	Township	Township	Second	Allegheny	January 4, 1982
Hanover	Township	Township	Second	Lehigh	January 2, 1978
Haverford	Township	Township	First	Delaware	January 3, 1977
Hermitage	City	City	Third	Mercer	January 1, 1976
Highland	Township	Township	Second	Elk	November 28, 2016
Horsham	Township	Township	Second	Montgomery	January 5, 1976
Johnstown	City	City	Third	Cambria	January 1, 1994
Kingston	Municipality	Borough	N/A	Luzerne	January 5, 1976
Kingston	Township	Township	Second	Luzerne	January 1, 1976
Lancaster	City	City	Third	Lancaster	January 1, 2025
Latrobe	City	Borough	N/A	Westmoreland	January 5, 1998
Lebanon	City	City	Third	Lebanon	January 3, 1994
Mahanoy City	Borough	Borough	N/A	Schuylkill	January 1, 2021
Malvern	Borough	Borough	N/A	Chester	January 1, 2009
McCandless	Town	Township	First	Allegheny	January 1, 1975
McKeesport	City	City	Third	Allegheny	January 5, 1976
Middletown	Township	Township	Second	Delaware	January 2, 1978
Monroeville	Municipality	Borough	N/A	Allegheny	January 5, 1976
Mt. Lebanon	Municipality	Township	First	Allegheny	January 1, 1975
Murrysville	Municipality	Borough	N/A	Westmoreland	January 1, 1978
Nanticoke	City	City	Third	Luzerne	January 1, 2012
New Castle	City	City	Third	Lawrence	January 3, 2022
Norristown	Municipality	Borough	N/A	Montgomery	January 6, 1986
O'Hara	Township	Township	First	Allegheny	January 5, 1976
Penn Hills	Municipality	Township	First	Allegheny	January 5, 1976
Peters	Township	Township	Second	Washington	January 5, 1976
Philadelphia	City	City	First	Philadelphia	January 7, 1952
Pine	Township	Township	Second	Allegheny	January 6, 1992
Pittsburgh	City	City	Second	Allegheny	January 5, 1976
Pittston	City	City	Third	Luzerne	January 2, 2013
Plymouth	Township	Township	Second	Luzerne	January 2, 2012
Plymouth	Township	Township	First	Montgomery	January 5, 1976
Portage	Borough	Borough	N/A	Cambria	January 1, 1996
Radnor	Township	Township	First	Delaware	January 1, 1977
Reading	City	City	Third	Berks	January 1, 1996
Richland	Township	Township	Second	Allegheny	January 5, 1976
St. Marys	City	City	Third	Elk	January 3, 1994
Scranton	City	City	Second A	Lackawanna	January 5, 1976
Sharon	City	City	Third	Mercer	January 7, 2008
State College	Borough	Borough	N/A	Centre	January 5, 1976
Towamencin	Township	Township	Second	Montgomery	July 1, 2023
Tredyffrin	Township	Township	Second	Chester	January 5, 1976
Tyrone	Borough	Borough	N/A	Blair	January 3, 1983
Upper Darby	Township	Township	First	Delaware	January 5, 1976
Upper Providence	Township	Township	Second	Delaware	January 5, 1976
Upper St. Clair	Township	Township	First	Allegheny	January 5, 1976
Warren	City	City	Third	Warren	January 2, 1978
West Chester	Borough	Borough	N/A	Chester	January 1, 1994
West Deer	Township	Township	Second	Allegheny	January 5, 1976
Whitehall	Borough	Borough	N/A	Allegheny	January 1, 1975
Whitehall	Township	Township	First	Lehigh	January 5, 1976
Whitemarsh	Township	Township	Second	Montgomery	January 3, 1983
Wilkes-Barre	City	City	Third	Luzerne	January 5, 1976
Wilkes-Barre	Township	Township	First	Luzerne	January 5, 1976
Wilkinsburg	Borough	Borough	N/A	Allegheny	January 1, 2025
Youngsville	Borough	Borough	N/A	Warren	January 5, 1976

== Counties with home rule charters ==
Counties with a home rule charter may design their own form of county government, but are still generally subject to the County Code (which covers first-, third-, fourth-, fifth-, sixth-, seventh-, and eighth-class counties) or the Second-Class County Code (which covers second-class and second-class A counties). Because home rule charters primarily function to change the form of local government, and do not significantly change the relationship between a county and the state, as they do with municipalities, counties with home rule charters are still generally considered counties under state law.

Philadelphia County is unique in Pennsylvania in that it is a consolidated city-county, and so while the county is technically not governed by a home rule charter (and is therefore not included on the list), the fact that Philadelphia City (which constitutes the same land area as and administers all the governmental affairs of Philadelphia County) is a home rule municipality means that in practice the county is as well.

Name	Class
Allegheny	Second
Delaware	Second A
Erie	Third
Lackawanna	Third
Lehigh	Third
Luzerne	Third
Northampton	Third

== Optional charter and optional plan municipalities ==
In addition to home rule charters, two other forms of non-standard government exist in Pennsylvania: optional plans and optional charters. Optional charter forms of government were made available to third-class cities in 1957. Since 1972, it has no longer been possible to adopt these forms; however, cities already operating under these forms retain them unless they adopt another form of government. Optional plan forms of government, which operate similarly to optional charter forms of government, were made available to all municipalities and counties in 1972. They both allow the municipality to adopt a form of government that differs from the general forms that municipalities are typically subject to, but do not change the municipality's relationship with the state government. Therefore, they are still considered boroughs, third-class cities, or townships of the first or second class, respectively, under state law.

Name	Type	Class	County	Charter/Plan	Form
Bensalem	Township	Second	Bucks	Plan	Mayor-Council Plan B
Bethlehem	City	Third	Lehigh; Northampton	Charter	Mayor-Council Plan A
Bristol	Township	First	Bucks	Plan	Mayor-Council Plan C
College	Township	Second	Centre	Plan	Council-Manager
DuBois	City	Third	Clearfield	Plan	Council-Manager
Erie	City	Third	Erie	Charter	Mayor-Council Plan A
Harrisburg	City	Third	Dauphin	Charter	Mayor-Council Plan A
Hazleton	City	Third	Luzerne	Plan	Mayor-Council Plan B
Indiana	Township	Second	Allegheny	Plan	Council-Manager
Lock Haven	City	Third	Clinton	Charter	Council-Manager
Lower Saucon	Township	Second	Northampton	Plan	Council-Manager
Meadville	City	Third	Crawford	Charter	Council-Manager
Oil City	City	Third	Venango	Charter	Council-Manager
Quakertown	Borough	N/A	Bucks	Plan	Council-Manager
Titusville	City	Third	Crawford	Charter	Council-Manager
Washington	Township	Second	Erie	Plan	Council-Manager
Weatherly	Borough	N/A	Carbon	Plan	Council-Manager
Williamsport	City	Third	Lycoming	Charter	Mayor-Council Plan A
York	City	Third	York	Charter	Mayor-Council Plan A

== Future optional plan municipalities ==
The following municipality has approved an optional plan that has not yet taken effect:

Name	Type	Class	County	Charter/Plan	Form	Effective Date
Millcreek	Township	Second	Erie	Plan	Council-Manager	January 1, 2028

== Government study commissions ==
The following municipalities approved questions to create government study commissions:

Name	Type (Municipal charter)	Type (State classification)	Class (State classification)	County	Election Date
Bradford	City	City	Third	McKean	November 4, 2025
Duquesne	City	City	Third	Allegheny	November 5, 2024
Hazleton	City	City	Third	Luzerne	May 20, 2025
Newville	Borough	Borough	N/A	Cumberland	November 4, 2025
Williamsport	City	City	Third	Lycoming	May 19, 2026

== Former home rule, optional charter, and optional plan municipalities ==
Name	Type (Municipal charter)	Type (State classification)	Class (State classification)	County
Bradford	City	City	Third	McKean
Wheatland	Borough	Borough	N/A	Mercer

== See also ==
- List of municipalities in Pennsylvania
- List of cities in Pennsylvania
- List of counties in Pennsylvania
- List of towns and boroughs in Pennsylvania
- List of townships in Pennsylvania
