= Zerbe Run =

Stream in central Pennsylvania

Zerbe Run Zerbe Creek
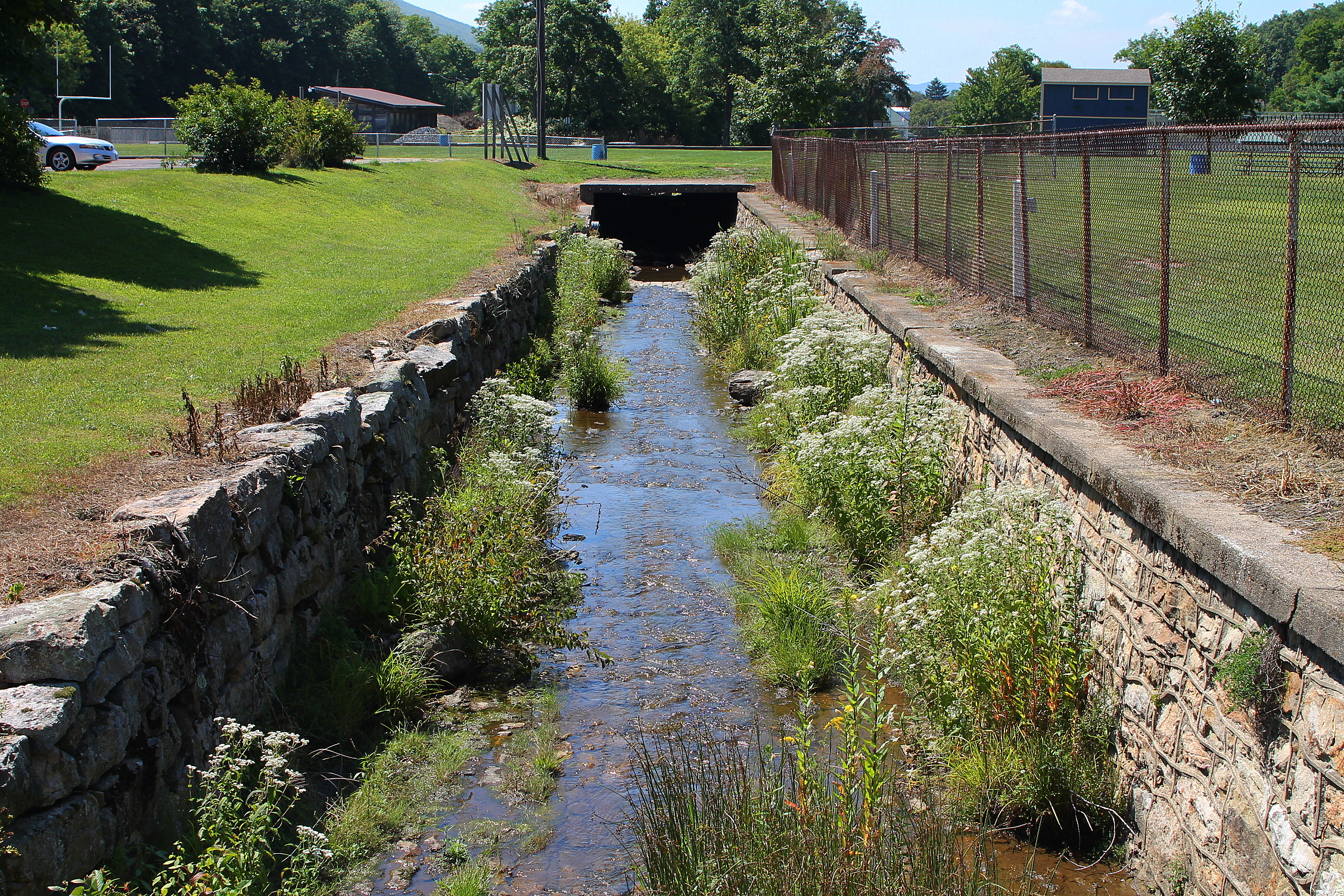
- Zerbe Run looking downstream in Trevorton

Physical characteristics
- Source
  - elevation: 861 ft (262 m)
- Mouth
  - location: Mahanoy Creek
  - coordinates: 40°45′16″N 76°45′25″W
  - elevation: 509 ft (155 m)
- Length: 8.3 mi (13.4 km)
- Basin size: 13.1 sq mi (34 km^{2})

Basin features
- Progression: Mahanoy Creek → Susquehanna River → Chesapeake Bay
- Tributaries
  - left: four unnamed tributaries

Zerbe Run (also known as Zerbe Creek) is a tributary of Mahanoy Creek in Northumberland County, Pennsylvania, in the United States. It is approximately 8.3 miles (13.4 km) long and flows through Coal Township, Zerbe Township, and Little Mahanoy Township. The watershed of the stream has an area of 13.1 square miles (34 km^{2}). Part of the stream is impaired by abandoned mine drainage, but its upper reaches are not impacted by mining. Several mine drainage discharges occur within the watershed. The stream is not far from the Western Middle Anthracite Field.

Zerbe Run is one of the major tributaries of Mahanoy Creek. Its watershed makes up 8.1 percent of the Mahanoy Creek drainage basin. A number of bridges have been constructed over the stream. Its watershed is designated as a Coldwater Fishery and a Migratory Fishery, but there are no fish in the stream. However, the Zerbe Run Rod And Gun Club Pond is stocked with trout and numerous macroinvertebrate taxa inhabit the stream. An area in its upper reaches is on the Northumberland County Natural Areas Inventory.

== Course ==
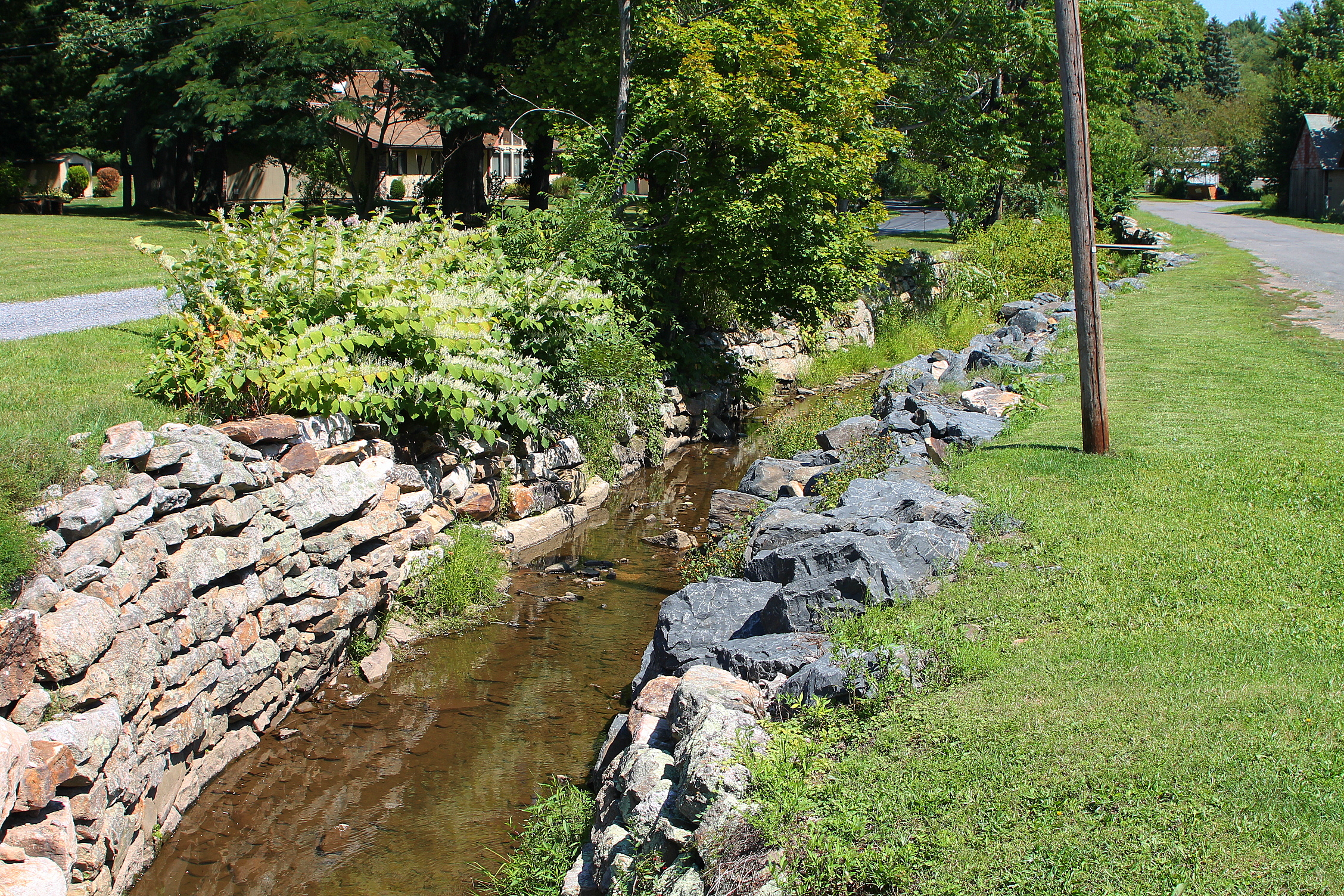
Zerbe Run looking upstream in Trevorton

Zerbe Run begins in a valley between two deep and broad ridges (Big Mountain and Little Mountain), in Coal Township. It flows west-southwest for a few tenths of a mile, entering Zerbe Township and the census-designated place of Trevorton. The stream continues flowing west-southwest through Zerbe Township and Trevorton for a few miles, eventually passing through a pond and crossing Pennsylvania Route 890. It then turns west-northwest for a few tenths of a mile, receiving an unnamed tributary from the left before turning west-southwest, crossing Pennsylvania Route 225, which it continues to flow alongside for several miles. After several tenths of a mile, the stream receives another unnamed tributary from the left and continues flowing west-southwest for several tenths of a mile. It then exits Trevorton and Zerbe Township and enters Little Mahanoy Township. Here, the stream turns southwest for more than a mile, receiving two more unnamed tributaries from the left as its valley broadens. It eventually reaches its confluence with Mahanoy Creek.

Zerbe Run joins Mahanoy Creek 10.74 miles (17.28 km) upstream of its mouth.

=== Tributaries ===
Zerbe Run has no named tributaries. However, it does have four unnamed tributaries, of which the uppermost is by far the longest.

== Hydrology ==
Some stream reaches in the watershed of Zerbe Run are designated as impaired waterbodies, but others are not. Abandoned mine drainage is the source of impairment of impaired streams in the watershed. The stream's watershed has four abandoned mine drainage sites: the North Franklin Mine drift and Borehole, the North Franklin Mine seepage, the North Franklin Mine bank seepage, and the North Franklin Mine Sunshine Mine overflow. Passive treatment wetlands may be suitable for treating the North Franklin Mine drift and Borehole discharge. There are also large silt piles along the stream near Trevorton. The effect that the abandoned mine drainage discharges have on the water quality of the stream depends on how much unimpacted water is flowing from the stream's upper reaches.

In 2001, Zerbe Run was found to be acidic during low base-flow conditions, but was nearly neutral during high base-flow conditions. In March 2001 and August 2001, the discharge of the stream was 7.99 and 0.62 cubic feet per second (0.226 and 0.018 m^{3}/s), respectively, while 4.6 miles (7.4 km) further downstream, the discharges were 30.2 and 4.36 cubic feet per second (0.855 and 0.123 m^{3}/s), respectively. In March and August 2001, the net alkalinity of the stream near Trevorton was 11 and 49 milligrams per liter (0.011 and 0.049 oz/cu ft), while the net alkalinity 4.6 miles (7.4 km) further downstream was −3 and −20 milligrams per liter (−0.0030 and −0.0200 oz/cu ft). In March and August 2001, the net pH of the stream near Trevorton was 7.0 to 7.2, while the net alkalinity 4.6 miles (7.4 km) further downstream was 4.3 to 6.0.

In March 2001, the concentration of aluminum in Zerbe Run near Trevorton was 0.04 milligrams per liter (4.0×10^{−5} oz/cu ft), while in August 2001, it was 0.02 milligrams per liter (2.0×10^{−5} oz/cu ft). 4.6 miles (7.4 km) downstream, the concentration was 0.10 milligrams per liter (0.000100 oz/cu ft) in March 2001 and 2.3 milligrams per liter (0.0023 oz/cu ft) in August 2001. The manganese concentration of the stream near Trevorton was 0.06 and 0.02 milligrams per liter (6.0×10^{−5} and 2.0×10^{−5} oz/cu ft) in March and August 2001, respectively. The manganese concentration 4.6 miles (7.4 km) further downstream was 0.93 and 2.7 milligrams per liter (0.00093 and 0.00270 oz/cu ft) in March and August 2001, respectively. The concentration of dissolved oxygen in the stream near Trevorton was 11.6 and 9.5 milligrams per liter (0.0116 and 0.0095 oz/cu ft) in March and August 2001, while further downstream, it was 11.5 and 8.8 milligrams per liter (0.0115 and 0.0088 oz/cu ft).

In March 2001, the nitrate concentration in Zerbe Run near Trevorton was 0.51 and 0.72 milligrams per liter (0.00051 and 0.00072 oz/cu ft) in March and August 2001, while 4.6 miles (7.4 km) the concentrations were 0.50 and 0.60 milligrams per liter (0.00050 and 0.00060 oz/cu ft). The phosphorus concentration near Trevorton was 0.01 milligrams per liter (1.00×10^{−5} oz/cu ft) both times, but 4.6 miles (7.4 km) further downstream, it was 0.04 milligrams per liter (4.0×10^{−5} oz/cu ft) in March and 0.02 milligrams per liter (2.0×10^{−5} oz/cu ft) in August. The sulfate concentration in March was 10 milligrams per liter (0.0100 oz/cu ft) near Trevorton and 99 milligrams per liter (0.099 oz/cu ft) further downstream, while it was 8 milligrams per liter (0.0080 oz/cu ft) near Trevorton in August and 264 milligrams per liter (0.264 oz/cu ft) 4.6 miles (7.4 km) further downstream.

In the early 1900s, the channel of Zerbe Run was colored yellow by sulfur pollution. A 1909 report by the Commissioner of Health of the Commonwealth of Pennsylvania stated that "there will be no harm to public health by the discharge of sewage into Zerbe Run at Trevorton".

== Geography and geology ==
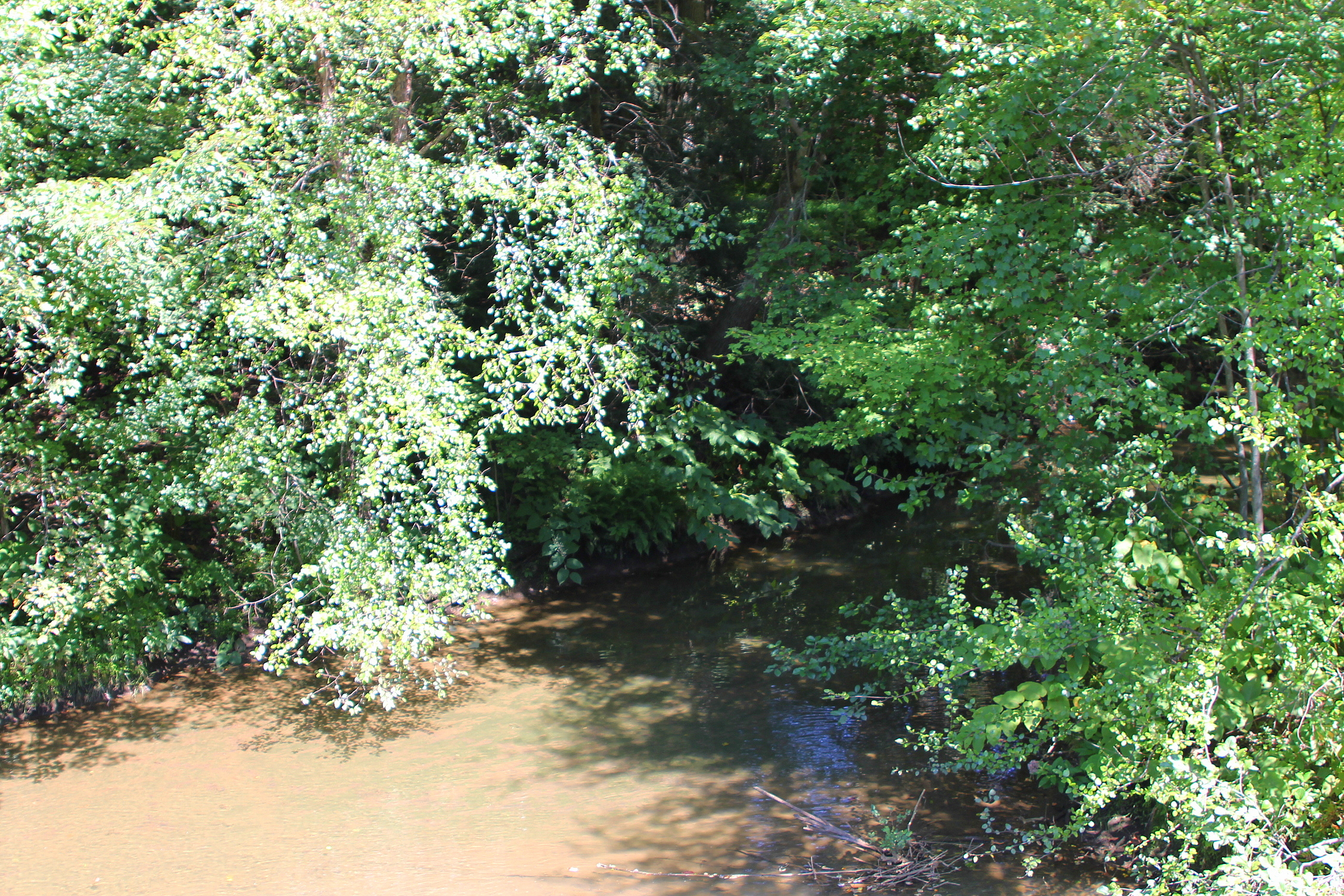
Mouth of Zerbe Run

The elevation near the mouth of Zerbe Run is 509 feet (155 m) above sea level. The elevation of the stream's source is 861 feet (262 m) above sea level.

A 50-foot (15 m) thick coal vein was discovered on Zerbe Run once. The valley of Zerbe Run is situated between Big Mountain on the north and Little Mountain on the south. The stream's valley is approximately 1 mile (1.6 km) wide and contains the community of Trevorton.

In the early 1900s, Zerbe Run was 100 feet (30 m) wide and 3 feet (0.91 m) deep at its mouth. Its flow rate was about 3 miles per hour (4.8 km/h). During this time period, there were culm banks in the vicinity of the stream at Trevorton. There was also a stone dam with a height of 5 feet (1.5 m) on the stream. The headwaters of the stream are located in springs east of Trevorton. The upper reaches of the stream's watershed are not impacted by mining. A mine drainage discharge south of Trevorton empties into the stream, causing it to be significantly polluted from Trevorton downstream to its mouth.

Zerbe Run is located just outside the Western Middle Anthracite Field. The dried sediment of the stream near Trevorton is dark brown on the Munsell color system. Further downstream, the sediment is strong brown on the Munsell color system.

== Watershed ==
The watershed of Zerbe Run has an area of 13.1 square miles (34 km^{2}). The mouth of the stream is in the United States Geological Survey quadrangle of Sunbury. However, its source is in the quadrangle of Shamokin. The stream also passes through the quadrangle of Trevorton. The mouth of the stream is located within 1 mile (1.6 km) of Hunter.

Zerbe Run is one of major streams in the watershed of Mahanoy Creek. Its watershed occupies a total of 8.3% of the Mahanoy Creek drainage basin. Most of the abandoned mine land in the watershed occurs to the south of the stream. A number of swamps/marshes and lakes/ponds occur in the watershed, as does a reservoir.

Areas along Zerbe Run can be significantly impacted by flooding. There are two groundwater withdrawals in the stream's watershed.

== History and recreation ==
Zerbe Run was entered into the Geographic Names Information System on August 2, 1979. Its identifier in the Geographic Names Information System is 1191948. The stream is also known as Zerbe Creek. It was mistakenly referred to as "Zerbe Creek" in a 1965 United States Geological Survey map. Despite this, civil engineer Stephen P Pousardien found in 1969 that all other references referred to the stream as "Zerbe Run", and that locals called the stream "Zerbe Run" as well. The stream was also once known as Little Mahanoy Creek, although there is another tributary of Mahanoy Creek called Little Mahanoy Creek.

There were historically mining operations on Zerbe Run at Trevorton.

A steel stringer/multi-beam or girder bridge carrying 8th Street over Zerbe Run in Trevorton was built in 1904 and repaired in 1997 and has a length of 26.9 feet (8.2 m). A concrete tee beam bridge carrying Pennsylvania Route 225 across the stream was built in Trevorton in 1934 and is 38.1 feet (11.6 m) long. A steel stringer/multi-beam or girder bridge carrying State Route 3004 was built over the stream in Raker in 1950 and was repaired in 2010; the bridge is 60.0 feet (18.3 m) long. A concrete culvert bridge carrying T-409 over Zerbe Run southwest of Trevorton was built in 1996 and is 24.0 feet (7.3 m) long.

Part of Pennsylvania State Game Lands Number 165 is in the northeastern corner of the watershed of Zerbe Run.

== Biology ==
The drainage basin of Zerbe Run is designated as a Coldwater Fishery and a Migratory Fishery. In 2001, macroinvertebrates were observed in the stream at Trevorton and near Dornsife, but no fish were observed. The stream has the potential to be stocked with trout. A lake known as the Zerbe Run Rod And Gun Club Pond is located in the stream's watershed and is stocked with trout.

In 2001, the macroinvertebrate taxa Hydropsychidae and Philopotamidae were "abundant" (25 to 100 individuals) in Zerbe Run at Trevorton. The taxa Leuctridae, Perlidae, Elmidae, and Crydalidae were "common" (10 to 24 individuals). The taxa Cambaridae, Chironomidae (red), Chironomidae (other), and Aeshnidae were "present" (3 to 9 individuals). The taxa Tipulidae, Simuliidae, and Baetidae were "rare" (1 to 2 individuals). Only four macroinvertebrate taxa (Tipulidae, Hydropsychidae, Sialidae, and Gomphidae) were observed in the stream further downstream, and all were "rare".

The family-level Hilsenhoff Biotic Index value of Zerbe Run near Trevorton was observed to be 3.75 in 2001 ("very good"/"excellent"). Further downstream, it was observed to be 4.75 ("good"). Grass-leaved rush, screw stem, and downy lettuce occur along Zerbe Run in Zerbe Township and Coal Township. Eastern hemlock, red maple, yellow birch, cinnamon fern, regal fern, a sedge, goldthread, and mayflower also occur in the area.

A reach of Zerbe Run near its headwaters is listed on the Northumberland County Natural Areas Inventory.

== See also ==
- Schwaben Creek, next tributary of Mahanoy Creek going downstream
- Crab Run (Mahanoy Creek), next tributary of Mahanoy Creek going upstream
- List of rivers of Pennsylvania
- List of tributaries of Mahanoy Creek
