= Kehly Run =

River in Pennsylvania, United States

Kehly Run Kahly Run

Physical characteristics
- Source
  - location: Fetter Pond in West Mahanoy Township, Pennsylvania
  - elevation: 1,675 ft (511 m)
- Mouth
  - location: Shenandoah Creek in West Mahanoy Township, Pennsylvania or Shenandoah, Schuylkill County, Pennsylvania
  - coordinates: 40°50′14″N 76°11′54″W
- Length: less than 2 miles (3.2 km)
- Basin size: 1.63 mi^{2} (4.2 km^{2})

Basin features
- Progression: Shenandoah Creek → Susquehanna River → Chesapeake Bay

Kehly Run (also known as Kahly Run) is a tributary of Shenandoah Creek in Schuylkill County, Pennsylvania. It is less than 2 miles (3.2 km) long and flows through West Mahanoy Township and possibly Shenandoah. The watershed of the stream has an area of 1.63 square miles (4.2 km^{2}). The stream is located within the Western Middle Anthracite Field. A number of dams have been constructed across it. The stream is classified as a Coldwater Fishery and has macroinvertebrates, but no fish.

== Course ==
Kehly Run begins in Fetter Pond in West Mahanoy Township, Pennsylvania. It flows west for several hundred feet, passing through another pond and entering Number Six Reservoir. From the southern end of this reservoir, the stream turns south-southeast for several tenths of a mile, passing near Number Five Reservoir, crossing Pennsylvania Route 924, and entering a valley.

In this valley, the creek flows in a generally southerly direction for several tenths of a mile, passing through Kehly Run Reservoir Number Three and Number Two Reservoir. Towards the lower reaches of this valley, in West Mahanoy Township, or possibly at or shortly after its end, in Shenandoah, the stream reaches its confluence with or becomes Shenandoah Creek.

Kehly Run joins Shenandoah Creek 5.01 miles (8.06 km) upstream of its mouth.

== Hydrology ==
Kehly Run is designated as an impaired waterbody. The stream is impacted by abandoned mine drainage. However, it has been described as having "very good" water quality at site S11, in its upper reaches. In the late 1800s, the stream was described as having once been a stream of "good, soft, pure mountain water".

In March 2001, the discharge of Kehly Run was measured to be 1.56 cubic feet per second (0.044 m^{3}/s), while in August 2001, it was 0.17 cubic feet per second (0.0048 m^{3}/s). The dissolved oxygen concentration was 11.3 and 6.8 milligrams per liter (0.0113 and 0.0068 oz/cu ft) in March and August 2001, respectively. In March 2001, the pH was 4.7 and the net alkalinity concentration was −3 milligrams per liter (−0.0030 oz/cu ft), while in August 2001, the pH was 4.8 and the net alkalinity concentration was −2 milligrams per liter (−0.0020 oz/cu ft).

The concentration of dissolved aluminum in Kehly Run was 0.43 milligrams per liter (0.00043 oz/cu ft) in March 2001 and 0.09 milligrams per liter (9.0×10^{−5} oz/cu ft) in August 2001. The dissolved manganese and iron concentrations in the stream were 0.10 and 0.08 milligrams per liter (0.000100 and 8.0×10^{−5} oz/cu ft) in March and 0.09 and 0.18 milligrams per liter (9.0×10^{−5} and 0.000180 oz/cu ft) in August.

In March 2001, the concentration of dissolved nitrate in Kehly Run was less than 0.10 milligrams per liter (0.000100 oz/cu ft), while the concentration in August 2001 was 0.05 milligrams per liter (5.0×10^{−5} oz/cu ft). The concentration of dissolved phosphorus was less than 0.01 milligrams per liter (1.00×10^{−5} oz/cu ft) in both March and August 2001. The sulfate concentration was 7 and 5 milligrams per liter (0.0070 and 0.0050 oz/cu ft) in March and August 2001, respectively.

== Geography and geology ==
The elevation of the source of Kehly Run is 1,675 feet (511 m) above sea level. The stream is situated entirely within the Western Middle Anthracite Field. There is some abandoned mine land in the vicinity of the stream's upper reaches.

The dried sediment of Kehly Run was light olive brown in the Munsell color system.

A dam known as the Kehly Run Dam No. 3 is 442 feet (135 m), about 33 feet (10 m) high, and is made of earth and rockfill. In 1980, the dam was judged to be in fair condition. There are three reservoirs further upstream and one pool further downstream.

== Watershed ==
The watershed of Kehly Run has an area of 1.63 square miles (4.2 km^{2}). The stream is entirely within the United States Geological Survey quadrangle of Shenandoah.

The watershed of Kehly Run occupies a total of approximately 1 percent of the Mahanoy Creek drainage basin. The watershed is located near the northeastern corner of the Shenandoah Creek watershed and in the upper part of the Mahanoy Creek watershed.

== History ==
Kehly Run was entered into the Geographic Names Information System on August 2, 1979. Its identifier in the Geographic Names Information System is 1178301. The stream is also known as Kahly Run. This variant name appears in a 1975 highway map of Schuylkill County, published by the Pennsylvania Department of Transportation.

In 2007, environmental assessments were proposed or made for the breaching of five dams in the watershed of Kehly Run.

== Biology ==
In 2001, no fish were observed in Kehly Run near Shenandoah, but macroinvertebrates were observed. A total of ten macroinvertebrate taxa were observed. Hydropsychidae was classified as "abundant", with 25 to 100 individuals being observed. Leuctridae and Simuliidae were classified as "common", with 10 to 24 individuals being observed. The taxa Cordulegastridae and Crydalidae were classified as "present", with three to nine individuals being observed. Another several taxa—Aeshnidae, Calopterygidae, Tipulidae, Cambaridae— were "rare", with only one or two individuals of each being observed. A small number of miscellaneous individuals from Diptera were observed.

Second-growth forest occurs in the vicinity of some reaches of Kehly Run. The family-level Hilsenhoff Biotic Index value of the stream was 4.14.

Historically, Kehly Run was used as a trout-fishing stream. The stream is classified as a Coldwater Fishery.

== See also ==
- List of rivers of Pennsylvania
- Lost Creek (Shenandoah Creek), next tributary of Shenandoah Creek going downstream
- List of tributaries of Mahanoy Creek
