= Crab Run (Mahanoy Creek tributary) =

River in Pennsylvania, United States

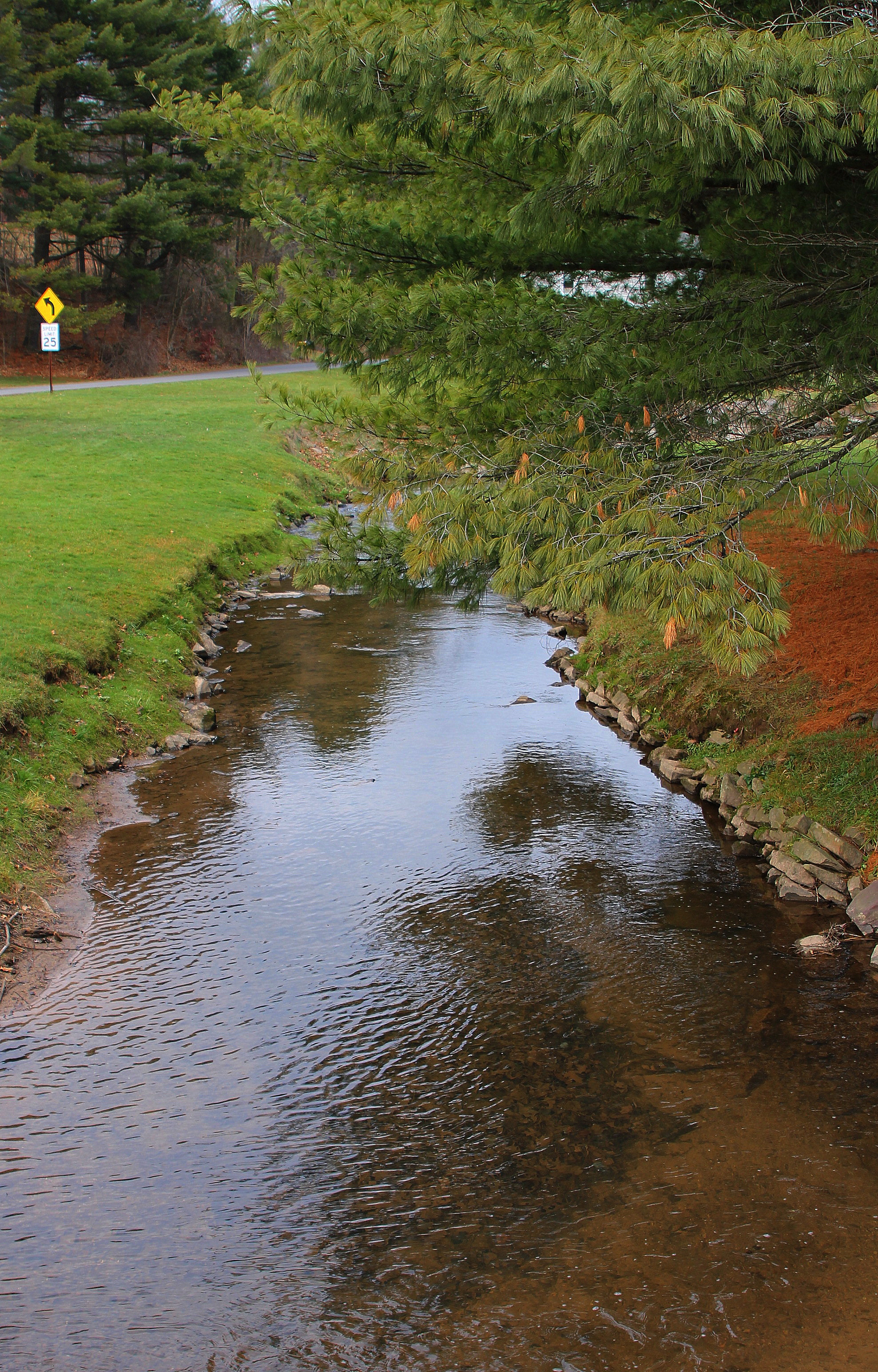
- Crab Run looking downstream

Physical characteristics
- Source
  - location: Barry Township, Schuylkill County, Pennsylvania, not far from the census-designated place of Beruys Lake
  - elevation: 897 ft (273 m)
- Mouth
  - location: Mahanoy Creek in Barry Township, Schuylkill County, Pennsylvania near Taylorville
  - coordinates: 40°44′56″N 76°23′22″W
  - elevation: 742 ft (226 m)
- Length: 2.5 mi (4.0 km)
- Basin size: 3.50 mi^{2} (9.1 km^{2})
- Discharge
  - average: (August 2001) 0.61 cu ft/s (0.017 m^{3}/s)

Basin features
- Progression: Mahanoy Creek → Susquehanna River → Chesapeake Bay
- Tributaries
  - left: one unnamed tributary
  - right: one unnamed tributary

Crab Run is a tributary of Mahanoy Creek in Schuylkill County, Pennsylvania, in the United States. It is approximately 2.5 miles (4.0 km) long and flows through Barry Township. The watershed of the stream has an area of 3.50 square miles (9.1 km^{2}). Despite being listed as impaired by abandoned mine drainage, the stream is not impacted by this; no mining has been done in its watershed. However, some stream reaches in its watershed do experience agricultural impacts. The stream is not far from the Western Middle Anthracite Field. Its watershed is designated as a Coldwater Fishery and a Migratory Fishery. As of 2001, the stream contains macroinvertebrates, but no fish.

== Course ==
Crab Run begins in Barry Township, not far from the census-designated place of Beurys Lake. It flows west-northwest for several tenths of a mile and passes through a pond or small lake before turning north-northeast. After several tenths of a mile, the stream receives an unnamed tributary from the left and turns northeast. Several tenths of a mile further downstream, it receives an unnamed tributary from the right and turns north-northwest for a few tenths of a mile, flowing alongside the base of a mountain. The stream then turns north-northeast for a short distance, passing through a pond or small lake before reaching its confluence with Mahanoy Creek.

Crab Run joins Mahanoy Creek 32.08 miles (51.63 km) upstream of its mouth.

== Hydrology ==
Some stream reaches in the watershed of Crab Run are not designated as impaired waterbodies. One stream reach is listed as impaired by metals from abandoned mine drainage, but no mining has been done in the watershed. Another stream reach is impaired by siltation/organic enrichment/low dissolved oxygen from agriculture/grazing.

In August 2001, the discharge of Crab Run was measured to be 0.61 cubic feet per second (0.017 m^{3}/s). The pH was 7.1 and the net alkalinity concentration was 32 milligrams per liter (0.032 oz/cu ft). The concentration of aluminum was 0.01 milligrams per liter (1.00×10^{−5} oz/cu ft) and the manganese and iron concentrations were 0.05 and 0.15 milligrams per liter (5.0×10^{−5} and 0.000150 oz/cu ft). The nitrate concentration was 3.3 milligrams per liter (0.0033 oz/cu ft), the phosphorus concentration was 0.08 milligrams per liter (8.0×10^{−5} oz/cu ft), and the sulfate concentration was 9 milligrams per liter (0.0090 oz/cu ft).

== Geography and geology ==
The elevation of the mouth of Crab Run is 742 feet (226 m) above sea level. The elevation of the stream's source is 897 feet (273 m) above sea level. Crab Run is situated some distance to the south of the Western Middle Anthracite Field.

The streambed of Crab Run predominantly features cobbles, but fine silt covers it as well. The Munsell color of the stream's dried sediment is dark yellowish brown.

== Watershed ==
The watershed of Crab Run has an area of 3.50 square miles (9.1 km^{2}). The stream is entirely within the United States Geological Survey quadrangle of Tremont. Its mouth is located within 1 mile (1.6 km) of the community of Taylorville.

== History ==
Crab Run was entered into the Geographic Names Information System on August 2, 1979. Its identifier in the Geographic Names Information System is 1172575.

A concrete tee beam bridge over Crab Run was built in Taylorville in 1940. It is 24.9 feet (7.6 m) long and carries Black Creek Road.

== Biology ==
The drainage basin of Crab Run is designated as a Coldwater Fishery and a Migratory Fishery. In 2001, no fish were observed in Crab Run. However, macroinvertebrates were observed.

In 2001, a total of ten macroinvertebrate taxa were observed in Crab Run. Chironomidae was "very abundant", with more than 100 individuals being observed. Simuliidae and Hydropsychidae were "abundant", with 25 to 100 individuals being observed. Ephemerellidae, Crydalidae, Tipulidae, Cambaridae, and Oligochaeta were "present", with 3 to 9 individuals being observed. The taxa Nemouridae and Heptageniidae were "rare", with 1 to 2 individuals being observed. The family-level Hilsenhoff Biotic Index value of Crab Run in 2001 was 5.61.

== See also ==
- Zerbe Run, next tributary of Mahanoy Creek going downstream
- Little Mahanoy Creek, next tributary of Mahanoy Creek going upstream
- List of rivers of Pennsylvania
- List of tributaries of Mahanoy Creek
