= Lost Creek (Shenandoah Creek tributary) =

Physical characteristics
- Source
  - location: Number Three Reservoir in West Mahanoy Township, Pennsylvania
  - elevation: 1,600 ft (490 m)
- Mouth
  - location: Shenandoah Creek in West Mahanoy Township, Pennsylvania near West William Penn
  - coordinates: 40°48′30″N 76°14′20″W
  - elevation: 1,053 ft (321 m)
- Length: 1.3 mi (2.1 km)
- Basin size: 1.32 sq mi (3.4 km^{2})

Basin features
- Progression: Shenandoah Creek → Mahanoy Creek → Susquehanna River → Chesapeake Bay

Lost Creek is a tributary of Shenandoah Creek in Schuylkill County, Pennsylvania, in the United States. It is approximately 1.3 miles (2.1 km) long and flows through West Mahanoy Township. The watershed of the creek has an area of 1.32 square miles (3.4 km^{2}).

The creek is an ephemeral stream in its lower reaches and is impaired by abandoned mine drainage. It is in the Western Middle Anthracite Field. The creek has historically been used as a water supply. It is designated as a Coldwater Fishery.

== Course ==
Lost Creek begins in the Number Three Reservoir in West Mahanoy Township, Pennsylvania. It flows southwest and enters the Raven Run Reservoir. From the southwestern end of that reservoir, the creek turns south and flows through a deep, narrow valley for several tenths of a mile, passing through the Number One Reservoir. It then reaches the end of its valley and turns south-southeast for a few tenths of a mile, passing between two ponds before reaching its confluence with Shenandoah Creek.

Lost Creek joins Shendandoah Creek 1.28 miles (2.06 km) upstream of its mouth.

== Hydrology ==
Lost Creek is designated as an impaired waterbody. The cause of the impairment is metals other than mercury and the likely source is abandoned mine drainage. The creek is an ephemeral stream in its lower reaches, on account of losing most or all of its flow to underground mine complexes. An abandoned mine drainage discharge known as the Weston Mine Lost Creek-Buck Mountain discharge is located within the creek's watershed.

The discharge of Lost Creek was measured to be 1.03 cubic feet per second (0.029 m^{3}/s) in March 2001 and 0.11 cubic feet per second (0.0031 m^{3}/s) in August 2001. The concentration of dissolved oxygen was 12.2 milligrams per liter (0.0122 oz/cu ft) in March and 7.5 milligrams per liter (0.0075 oz/cu ft) in August. In March 2001, the creek's pH was 6.2 and the net alkalinity was 3 milligrams per liter (0.0030 oz/cu ft), while in August 2001, the pH was 6.3 and the net alkalinity was also 3 milligrams per liter (0.0030 oz/cu ft).

The concentration of dissolved aluminum in Lost Creek was 0.06 milligrams per liter (6.0×10^{−5} oz/cu ft) in March 2001 and 0.02 milligrams per liter (2.0×10^{−5} oz/cu ft) in August 2001. The manganese and iron concentrations in March were 0.09 and 0.05 milligrams per liter (9.0×10^{−5} and 5.0×10^{−5} oz/cu ft), while in August they were 0.18 and 0.03 milligrams per liter (0.000180 and 3.0×10^{−5} oz/cu ft).

The dissolved nitrate concentration in Lost Creek was 0.20 milligrams per liter (0.00020 oz/cu ft) in March 2001 and 0.13 milligrams per liter (0.00013 oz/cu ft) in August 2001. The concentration of dissolved phosphorus was 0.03 milligrams per liter (3.0×10^{−5} oz/cu ft) in March and 0.02 milligrams per liter (2.0×10^{−5} oz/cu ft) in August. The dissolved sulfate concentration was 10 and 12 milligrams per liter (0.0100 and 0.0120 oz/cu ft) in March and August 2001, respectively.

== Geography and geology ==
The elevation near the mouth of Lost Creek is 1,053 feet (321 m) above sea level. The elevation of the creek's source is approximately 1,600 feet (490 m) above sea level.

Lost Creek is in the Western Middle Anthracite Field. Dried sediment from the creek is grayish brown in the Munsell color system.

Approximately 2,000 feet (610 m) northeast of a village known as Lost Creek, Lost Creek flows into a strip pit and infiltrates the Weston Mine Pool.

== Watershed ==
The watershed of Lost Creek has an area of 1.32 square miles (3.4 km^{2}). The creek is entirely within the United States Geological Survey quadrangle of Shenandoah. Its mouth is located within 1 mile (1.6 km) of the community of West William Penn.

The watershed of Lost Creek occupies approximately 0.8 percent of the Mahanoy Creek drainage basin. It is in the north-central part of the Shenandaoh Creek watershed and the upper part of the Mahanoy Creek watershed.

The designated use of Lost Creek is aquatic life.

== History ==
Lost Creek was entered into the Geographic Names Information System on August 2, 1979. Its identifier in the Geographic Names Information System is 1179963.

In the late 1800s, 20,000 European larches were planted near the north bank of Lost Creek to help establish a second-growth forest. In the early 1900s, Lost Creek was a clear stream upstream of the Packer No. 2 Colliery, which was owned by the Lehigh Valley Coal Company. At the colliery, large amounts of mine water and culm polluted the creek. The creek was used as a water supply by the Girard Water Company during this time period.

== Biology ==
Lost Creek is classified as a Coldwater Fishery.

In 2001, macroinvertebrates were observed in Lost Creek, but no fish were observed. Only four macroinvertebrate taxa were observed: Limnephilidae, Tipulidae, Cambaridae, and Oligochaeta. All were classified as "rare", with only one or two individuals being observed.

In 2001, the family-level Hilsenhoff Biotic Index value of Lost Creek was 6.

== See also ==
- Kehly Run, next tributary of Shendandoah Creek going upstream
- List of rivers of Pennsylvania
- List of tributaries of Mahanoy Creek
