= North Mahanoy Creek =

River in Pennsylvania, United States

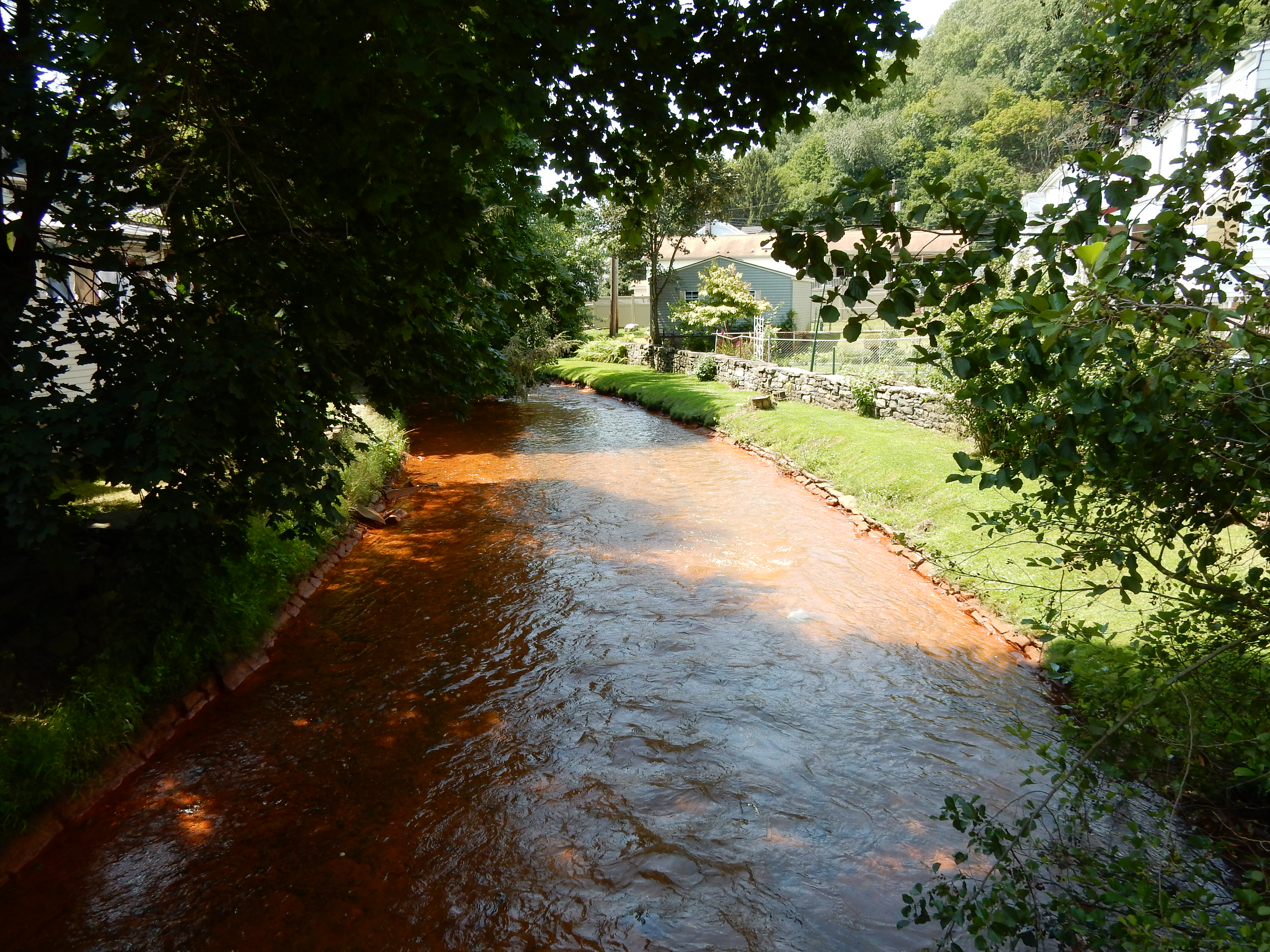
- Mahanoy Creek in Girardville, Pennsylvania

Physical characteristics
- Source
  - location: Bear Head in Delano Township, Pennsylvania
  - elevation: 1,889 ft (576 m)
- Mouth
  - location: Mahanoy Creek in Mahanoy City, Schuylkill County, Pennsylvania
  - coordinates: 40°48′50″N 76°08′29″W
  - elevation: 1,224 ft (373 m)
- Length: 4.4 mi (7.1 km)
- Basin size: 5.99 mi^{2} (15.5 km^{2})

Basin features
- Progression: Mahanoy Creek → Susquehanna River → Chesapeake Bay
- Tributaries
  - right: "Pole Run", "Cold Run", two other unnamed tributaries

North Mahanoy Creek is a tributary of Mahanoy Creek in Schuylkill County, Pennsylvania. It is approximately 4.4 miles (7.1 km) long and flows through Delano Township, Mahanoy Township, and Mahanoy City. The watershed of the creek has an area of 5.99 square miles (15.5 km^{2}). The creek is designated as an impaired waterbody due to sedimentation/siltation and water/flow variation from abandoned mine drainage. The creek is relatively small, an ephemeral stream in its lower reaches, and is located within the Western Middle Anthracite Field.

The watershed of North Mahanoy Creek is in the upper part of the Mahanoy Creek drainage basin. It is one of the major tributaries of Mahanoy Creek. A number of bridge have been constructed over North Mahanoy Creek. The creek's watershed is designated as a Coldwater Fishery and a Migratory Fishery. It has a few macroinvertebrate taxa, but no fish. However, wild trout naturally reproduce in two of its unnamed tributaries.

== Course ==
North Mahanoy Creek begins on Bear Head in Delano Township. It flows southwest for a few tenths of a mile before turning south and flowing along the border of the census-designated place of Delano. The creek then enters a valley and turns west-southwest for a few miles, almost immediately entering Mahanoy Township. Further downstream, it receives three unnamed tributaries from the right. The creek then turns southwest for several tenths of a mile, receiving another unnamed tributary from the right before turning south and then south-southeast. It then turns southwest for several tenths of a mile, entering Mahanoy City and reaching its confluence with Mahanoy Creek.

North Mahanoy Creek joins Mahanoy Creek 49.27 miles (79.29 km) upstream of its mouth.

=== Tributaries ===
North Mahanoy Creek has no named tributaries. However, it does have a number of unnamed tributaries. Two of these are known unofficially as "Pole Run" and "Cold Run". Their lengths are 1.20 and 1.04 miles (1.93 and 1.67 km), respectively.

== Hydrology ==
North Mahanoy Creek is designated as an impaired waterbody. The causes of impairment are sedimentation/siltation and water/flow variation and the likely source of impairment is abandoned mine drainage. The creek loses most or all of its flow to underground mines. The lower reaches of the creek are ephemeral due to this flow loss.

The discharge of North Mahanoy Creek at its mouth was 8.70 cubic feet per second (0.246 m^{3}/s) in March 2001 and 0 cubic feet per second (0 m^{3}/s) in August 2001. In March 2001, the concentration of dissolved oxygen was 11.1 milligrams per liter (0.0111 oz/cu ft). The pH was 5.6 and the net alkalinity concentration was 1 milligram per liter (0.00100 oz/cu ft). The concentration of water hardness was 6.57 milligrams per liter (0.00656 oz/cu ft). In late March 2001, the water temperature of the creek was measured to be 6.9 °C (44.4 °F). The specific conductance of the creek's water was 54 micro-siemens per centimeter at 25 °C (77 °F).

In March 2001, the concentration of dissolved aluminum in North Mahanoy Creek at its mouth was 0.06 milligrams per liter (6.0×10^{−5} oz/cu ft). The concentrations of dissolved manganese and iron were 0.02 and 0.01 milligrams per liter (2.00×10^{−5} and 1.00×10^{−5} oz/cu ft), respectively. The concentrations of recoverable sodium and potassium were 2.8 and 0.5 milligrams per liter (0.00280 and 0.00050 oz/cu ft), respectively. The concentrations of recoverable magnesium and calcium were 0.7 and 1.4 milligrams per liter (0.00070 and 0.00140 oz/cu ft), respectively.

In March 2001, the dissolved nitrate concentration at the mouth of North Mahanoy Creek was 0.05 milligrams per liter (5.0×10^{−5} oz/cu ft) and the dissolved phosphorus concentration was 0.01 milligrams per liter (1.00×10^{−5} oz/cu ft). The concentration of dissolved sulfates was 5 milligrams per liter (0.0050 oz/cu ft). The concentration of carbon dioxide was measured to be 7.9 milligrams per liter (0.0079 oz/cu ft).

== Geography and geology ==
The elevation near the mouth of North Mahanoy Creek is 1,224 feet (373 m) above sea level. The elevation of the creek's source is 1,889 feet (576 m) above sea level. The creek is a relatively small stream, being approximately a few feet wide in the late 1800s.

North Mahanoy Creek is situated entirely within the Western Middle Anthracite Field, where coal was extensively mined between 1840 and 1950. There are relatively large silt piles in the vicinity of the creek. The landscape in the creek's vicinity is scarred by past mining operations, but there are no large abandoned mine drainage discharges in its watershed. There are still mining operations and abandoned mine lands in the watershed.

The headwaters of North Mahanoy Creek are in unpolluted springs and surface runoff near Locust Mountain. However, strip mining has caused significant disruption to the watershed. A coal basin known as the North Mahanoy Basin is in the vicinity of the creek.

== Watershed ==
The watershed of North Mahanoy Creek has an area of 5.99 square miles (15.5 km^{2}). The mouth of the creek is in the United States Geological Survey quadrangle of Shenandoah. However, its source is in the quadrangle of Delano. The creek is one of the major tributaries of Mahanoy Creek.

The designated use of North Mahanoy Creek is aquatic life. The creek's watershed is in the uppermost part of the Mahanoy Creek drainage basin.

There are a number of lakes and/or ponds in the watershed of North Mahanoy Creek.

== History ==
North Mahanoy Creek was entered into the Geographic Names Information System on August 2, 1979. Its identifier in the Geographic Names Information System is 1193047.

By the late 1800s, walls 8 or 9 feet (2.4 or 2.7 m) high had been built on both sides of North Mahanoy Creek to keep its waters in. It was alleged during a case in the late 1800s that waste from a nearby gas works was being discharged into the creek. In the early 1900s, numerous private sewers discharged into North Mahanoy Creek.

A steel stringer/multi-beam or girder bridge carrying Park Place Road over North Mahanoy Creek was built in 1960 and is 36.1 feet (11.0 m) long. Another bridge of the same type, and carrying the same road was built across the creek in 1961 and is 30.8 feet (9.4 m) long.

As of 2015, the Gilberton Coal Company has a permit for surface mine renewal, reprocessing of coal waste, and refuse disposal in 25.9 acres (10.5 ha) in Mahanoy Township; the receiving stream is North Mahanoy Creek.

== Biology ==
The drainage basin of North Mahanoy Creek is designated as a Coldwater Fishery and a Migratory Fishery. In 2001, no fish were observed in at the mouth of the creek. However, macroinvertebrates were observed there. Wild trout naturally reproduce in two unnamed tributaries of the creek.

In 2001, a total of five macroinvertebrate taxa were observed on North Mahanoy Creek. The taxa Chironomidae and Simuliidae were classified as "common", with 10 to 24 individuals being observed. The taxa Limnephilidae and Rhyacophilidae were classified as "present", with 3 to 9 individuals being observed. Oligochaeta was classified as "rare", with only one or two individuals being observed.

In 2001, the family-level Hilsenhoff Biotic Index value of North Mahanoy Creek at its mouth was 5.24.

== See also ==
- Shenandoah Creek, next tributary of Mahanoy Creek going downstream
- List of rivers of Pennsylvania
- List of tributaries of Mahanoy Creek
