= List of tributaries of Mahanoy Creek =

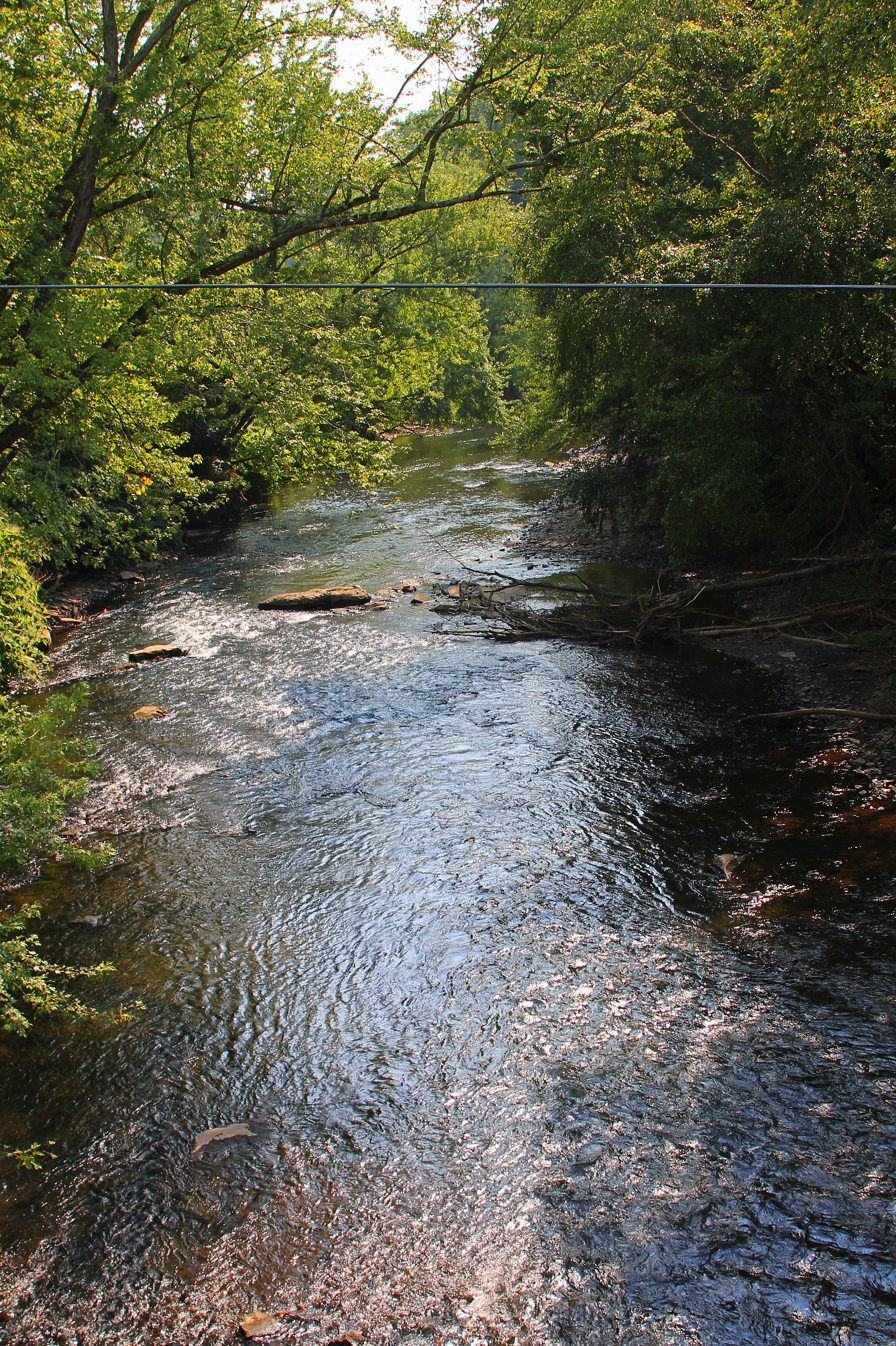
Mahanoy Creek looking downstream near its mouth, below all of its tributaries

Mahanoy Creek is a 51-mile (82 km) long tributary of the Susquehanna River in Schuylkill County and Northumberland County, in Pennsylvania, in the United States. It has eleven officially named tributaries, of which six are direct tributaries and five are sub-tributaries. These include seven creeks and four runs. The largest tributary by both length and watershed area is Schwaben Creek, which is 10.7 miles (17.2 km) long and drains an area of 30.2 square miles (78 km^{2}). The second-largest by these measures is Zerbe Run, which is 8.3 miles (13.4 km) long and drains an area of 13.1 square miles (34 km^{2}).

Many of the tributaries of Mahanoy Creek have been impacted by mining, including Zerbe Run, Shenandoah Creek, and North Mahanoy Creek. Schwaben Creek and Little Mahanoy Creek are the only large tributaries that are not affected by mining. Many of the upper tributaries are in the Western Middle Anthracite Field. In March 2001, the officially named tributary with the highest discharge was Zerbe Run at Dornsife (30.2 cubic feet per second (0.86 m^{3}/s)), while the tributary with the lowest discharge was Lost Creek (1.03 cubic feet per second (0.029 m^{3}/s)). In August of that year, Little Mahanoy Creek had the highest discharge (6.80 cubic feet per second (0.193 m^{3}/s)) and North Mahanoy Creek had the lowest discharge (0 discharge). In March 2001, the pH ranged from 4.7 for Lost Creek to 8.4 for Schwaben Creek. Some streams were downstream of abandoned mine drainage discharges accounting for their acidity.

In 2001, Schwaben Creek was the only named tributary of Mahanoy Creek that was found to contain fish; it had twenty different species. However, every officially named tributary save for Rattling Run had macroinvertebrates. The Hilsenhoff Biotic Index values for macroinvertebrate families in all other tributaries ranged from 10 for Shenandoah Creek at Lost Creek to 3.76 for Schwaben Creek; lower values are ideal (values under 3.75 are considered "excellent", while values over 7.25 are considered "very poor"). Although Mahanoy Creek is classified as a Warmwater Fishery, all of its tributaries are classified as Coldwater Fisheries, save for Schwaben Creek and its tributaries Mouse Creek and Middle Creek, which are Trout Stocked Fisheries. Little Mahanoy Creek is the only named tributary to contain wild trout, but it and part of Schwaben Creek are stocked with trout.

== Tributaries of Mahanoy Creek ==
Name	Length	Watershed area	Distance from mouth	Mouth elevation	Source elevation	Mouth coordinates	Image
Schwaben Creek	10.7 miles (17.2 km)	30.2 square miles (78 km^{2})	6.18 miles (9.95 km)	463 feet (141 m)	980 feet (300 m)	40°43′04″N 76°47′32″W	
Zerbe Run	8.3 miles (13.4 km)	13.1 square miles (34 km^{2})	10.74 miles (17.28 km)	509 feet (155 m)	861 feet (262 m)	40°45′16″N 76°45′24″W	
Crab Run	2.5 miles (4.0 km)	3.50 square miles (9.1 km^{2})	32.08 miles (51.63 km)	742 feet (226 m)	897 feet (273 m)	40°44′28″N 76°23′23″W	
Little Mahanoy Creek	7.5 miles (12.1 km)	11.0 square miles (28 km^{2})	35.67 miles (57.41 km)	794 feet (242 m)	1,449 feet (442 m)	40°45′16″N 76°20′39″W	
Shenandoah Creek	> 5 miles (8.0 km)	12.1 square miles (31 km^{2})	41.72 miles (67.14 km)	958 feet (292 m)	1,300 feet (400 m)	40°47′42″N 76°16′36″W	—
North Mahanoy Creek	4.4 miles (7.1 km)	5.99 square miles (15.5 km^{2})	49.27 miles (79.29 km)	1,224 feet (373 m)	1,889 feet (576 m)	40°48′50″N 76°08′28″W	

=== Tributaries of Schwaben Creek ===
Name	Length	Watershed area	Distance from mouth	Mouth elevation	Source elevation	Mouth coordinates	Image
Mouse Creek	5.6 miles (9.0 km)	7.19 square miles (18.6 km^{2})	0.48 miles (0.77 km)	476 feet (145 m)	850 feet (260 m)	40°42′50″N 76°47′08″W	
Middle Creek	3.5 miles (5.6 km)	3.70 square miles (9.6 km^{2})	3.28 miles (5.28 km)	551 feet (168 m)	817 feet (249 m)	40°43′17″N 76°44′08″W	

=== Tributaries of Little Mahanoy Creek ===
Name	Length	Watershed area	Distance from mouth	Mouth elevation	Source elevation	Mouth coordinates	Image
Rattling Run	2.3 miles (3.7 km)	2.75 square miles (7.1 km^{2})	0.32 miles (0.51 km)	810 feet (250 m)	1,460 feet (450 m)	40°45′10″N 76°20′22″W	

=== Tributaries of Shenandoah Creek ===
Name	Length	Watershed area	Distance from mouth	Mouth elevation	Source elevation	Mouth coordinates	Image
Lost Creek	1.3 miles (2.1 km)	1.32 square miles (3.4 km^{2})	1.28 miles (2.06 km)	1,053 feet (321 m)	1,600 feet (490 m)	40°48′40″N 76°14′31″W	—
Kehly Run	< 2 miles (3.2 km)	1.63 square miles (4.2 km^{2})	5.01 miles (8.06 km)	—	1,675 feet (511 m)	40°49′35″N 76°11′39″W	—

== See also ==
- List of rivers of Pennsylvania
