= Shenandoah Creek =

Tributary of Mahanoy Creek in Schuylkill County, Pennsylvania

Coordinates: 40°47′43″N 76°16′35″W

Shenandoah Creek is a tributary of Mahanoy Creek in Schuylkill County, Pennsylvania, in the United States. It is at least 5 miles (8.0 km) long and flows through Shenandoah, West Mahanoy Township, Butler Township, and Girardville.

== Course ==
Shenandoah Creek begins in West Mahanoy Township, at or near the confluence of the tributary Kehly Run. Upon entering Shenandoah, the creek flows south and then in a southwesterly direction, crossing Pennsylvania Route 924. It then turns west for several tenths of a mile, entering West Mahanoy Township and crossing Pennsylvania Route 54. Here, the creek flows west-southwest in a valley alongside Pennsylvania Route 54 for a few miles, receiving the tributary Lost Creek and crossing Pennsylvania Route 54 once, before entering a pond and flowing into Butler Township. Here, it exits the pond and flows west for a few tenths of a mile before turning southwest. After a few tenths of a mile, it passes through a wetland, enters Girardville, and reaches its confluence with Mahanoy Creek.

Shenandoah Creek joins Mahanoy Creek 41.72 miles (67.14 km) upstream of its mouth.

=== Tributaries ===
Shenandoah Creek has two named tributaries: Kehly Run and Lost Creek. Kehly Run joins Shenandoah Creek 5.01 miles (8.06 km) upstream of its mouth and drains an area of 1.63 square miles (4.2 km^{2}). Lost Creek joins Shenandoah Creek 1.28 miles (2.06 km) upstream of its mouth and drains an area of 1.32 square miles (3.4 km^{2}).

== Hydrology ==
Shenandoah Creek is impaired by abandoned mine drainage throughout its length, and also by municipal point source pollution in one reach. Shenandoah Creek's contribution to the waters of Mahanoy Creek causes the latter creek's flow to nearly double.

== Geography and geology ==
The elevation near the mouth of Shenandoah Creek is 958 feet (292 m) above sea level.

== Watershed ==
The watershed of Shenandoah Creek has an area of 12.1 square miles (31 km^{2}). The mouth of the creek is in the United States Geological Survey quadrangle of Ashland. However, its source is in the quadrangle of Shenandoah.

Shenandoah Creek is one of the major tributaries of Mahanoy Creek. There are several lakes/ponds in the creek's watershed, and a wetland occurs in its lower reaches.

== History ==
A steel stringer/multi-beam or girder bridge carrying State Route 4031 over Shenandoah Creek was built in 1937 near Pennsylvania Route 54 and is 34.1 feet (10.4 m) long.

== Biology ==
The drainage basin of Shenandoah Creek is designated as a Coldwater Fishery and a Migratory Fishery.

== See also ==
- Little Mahanoy Creek, next tributary of Mahanoy Creek going downstream
- North Mahanoy Creek, next tributary of Mahanoy Creek going upstream
- List of rivers of Pennsylvania
- List of tributaries of Mahanoy Creek
