= Middle Creek (Schwaben Creek tributary) =

River in Pennsylvania, United States

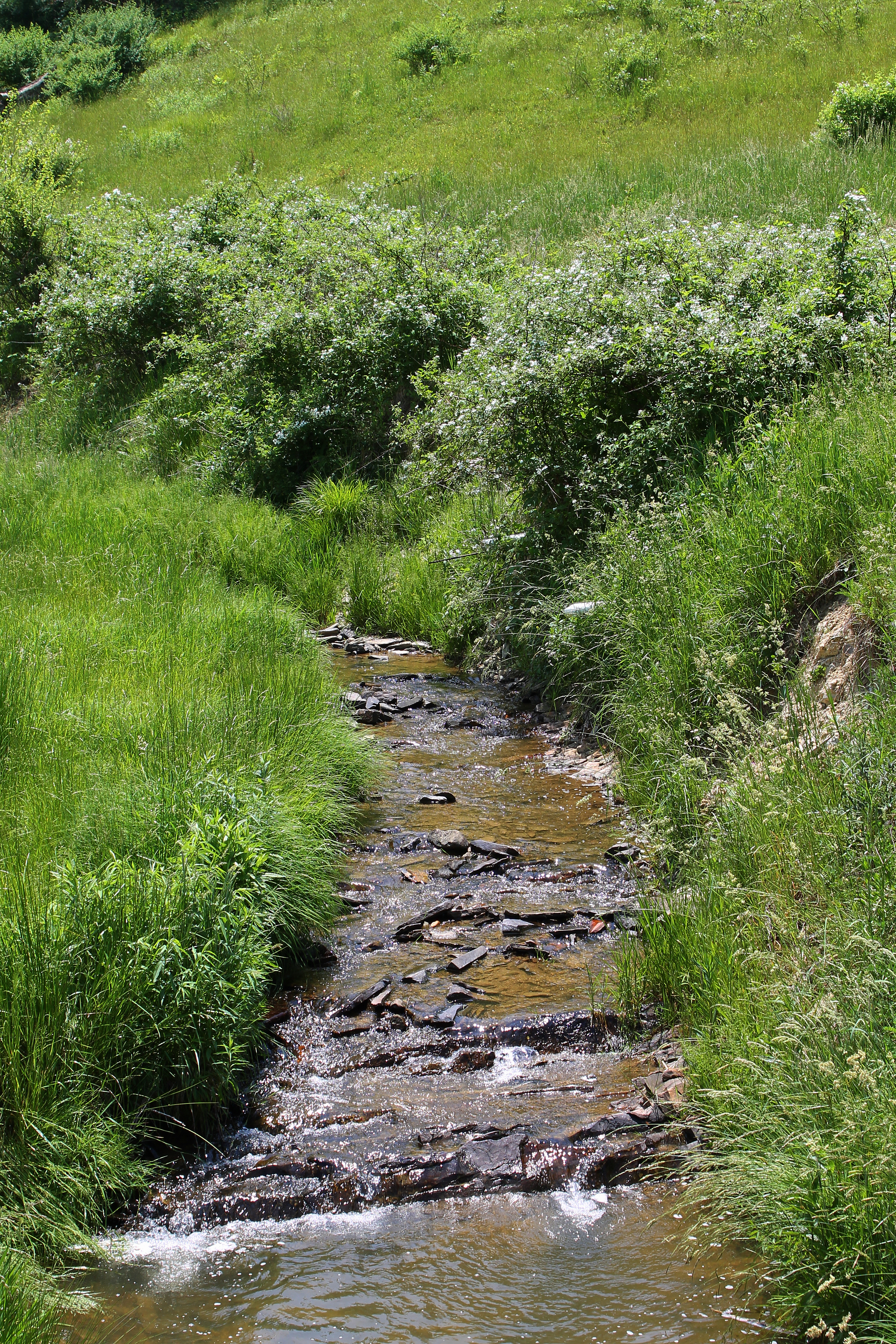
- Middle Creek looking upstream

Physical characteristics
- Source
  - location: valley north of Hooflander Mountain in Washington Township, Northumberland County, Pennsylvania
  - elevation: 817 ft (249 m)
- Mouth
  - location: Schwaben Creek in Washington Township, Northumberland County, Pennsylvania
  - coordinates: 40°43′18″N 76°44′09″W
  - elevation: 551 ft (168 m)
- Length: 3.5 mi (5.6 km)
- Basin size: 3.28 mi^{2} (8.5 km^{2})

Basin features
- Progression: Schwaben Creek → Mahanoy Creek → Susquehanna River → Chesapeake Bay
- Tributaries
  - left: two unnamed tributaries
  - right: three unnamed tributaries

Middle Creek is a tributary of Schwaben Creek in Northumberland County, Pennsylvania, in the United States. It is approximately 3.5 miles (5.6 km) long and flows through Washington Township. The watershed of the creek has an area of 3.28 square miles (8.5 km^{2}). The creek is designated as an impaired waterbody, with the cause of the impairment being siltation, low dissolved oxygen levels/organic enrichment, and vegetation removal and the source being agricultural activity. The creek is classified as a Trout Stocked Fishery.

== Course ==
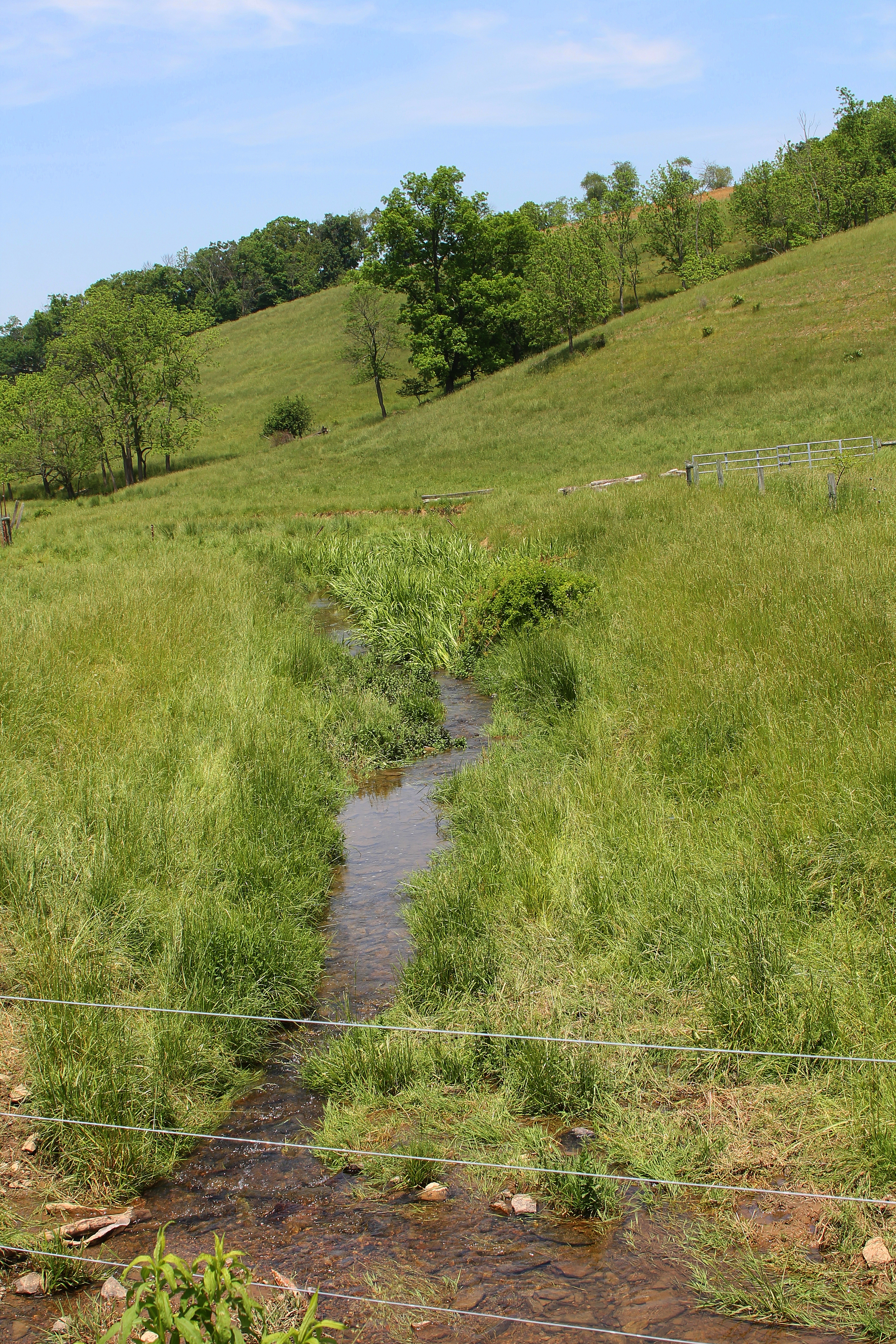
Middle Creek looking downstream

Middle Creek begins in a valley north of Hooflander Mountain in Washington Township. It flows west-southwest for several tenths of a mile before turning west-northwest and then north, away from Hooflander Mountain. In this reach, the creek receives an unnamed tributary from the right. It then continues flowing north for more than a mile, receiving an unnamed tributary from the left and another two from the right. It then turns west for several tenths of a mile and receives an unnamed tributary from the left before turning northwest. After a short distance, it reaches its confluence with Schwaben Creek.

Middle Creek joins Schwaben Creek 3.70 miles (5.95 km) upstream of its mouth.

== Hydrology ==
Middle Creek is designated as an impaired waterbody due to siltation, low dissolved oxygen/organic enrichment, and vegetation removal. The source of the impairment is agricultural activity.

In one measurement on June 15, 1993, Middle Creek had a discharge of 0.68 cubic feet per second (0.019 m^{3}/s) at Rebuck. The specific conductance of the creek was 105 micro-siemens per centimeter at 25 °C (77 °F). The pH of the creek was measured to be 7.6. the alkalinity concentration in the creek's filtered water was 33 milligrams per liter (0.033 oz/cu ft).

On June 15, 1993, the concentration of carbon dioxide in Middle Creek at Rebuck was 1.3 milligrams per liter (0.0013 oz/cu ft) and the bicarbonate concentration was 33 milligrams per liter (0.033 oz/cu ft). The concentration of nitrogen in the form of nitrates and nitrites in the creek's filtered water was 3.5 milligrams per liter (0.0035 oz/cu ft).

== Geography, geology, and climate ==
The elevation near the mouth of Middle Creek is 551 feet (168 m) above sea level. The elevation of the creek's source is 817 feet (249 m) above sea level.

During one measurement in the morning of June 15, 1993, the water temperature of Middle Creek at Rebuck was 18.5 °C (65.3 °F), while the air temperature was 22.0 °C (71.6 °F).

== Watershed and biology ==
The watershed of Middle Creek has an area of 3.28 square miles (8.5 km^{2}). The creek is entirely within the United States Geological Survey quadrangle of Klingerstown. The mouth of the creek is located within 1 mile (1.6 km) of the community of Rebuck.

The watershed of Middle Creek is in the middle part of the watershed of Schwaben Creek and in the lower part of the Mahanoy Creek drainage basin.

Middle Creek, like all other streams in the watershed of Schwaben Creek, is designated as a Trout Stocked Fishery.

== History ==
Middle Creek was entered into the Geographic Names Information System on August 2, 1979. Its identifier in the Geographic Names Information System is 1181020.

== See also ==
- Mouse Creek (Schwaben Creek), next tributary of Schwaben Creek going downstream
- List of rivers of Pennsylvania
- List of tributaries of Mahanoy Creek
