= Schwaben Creek =

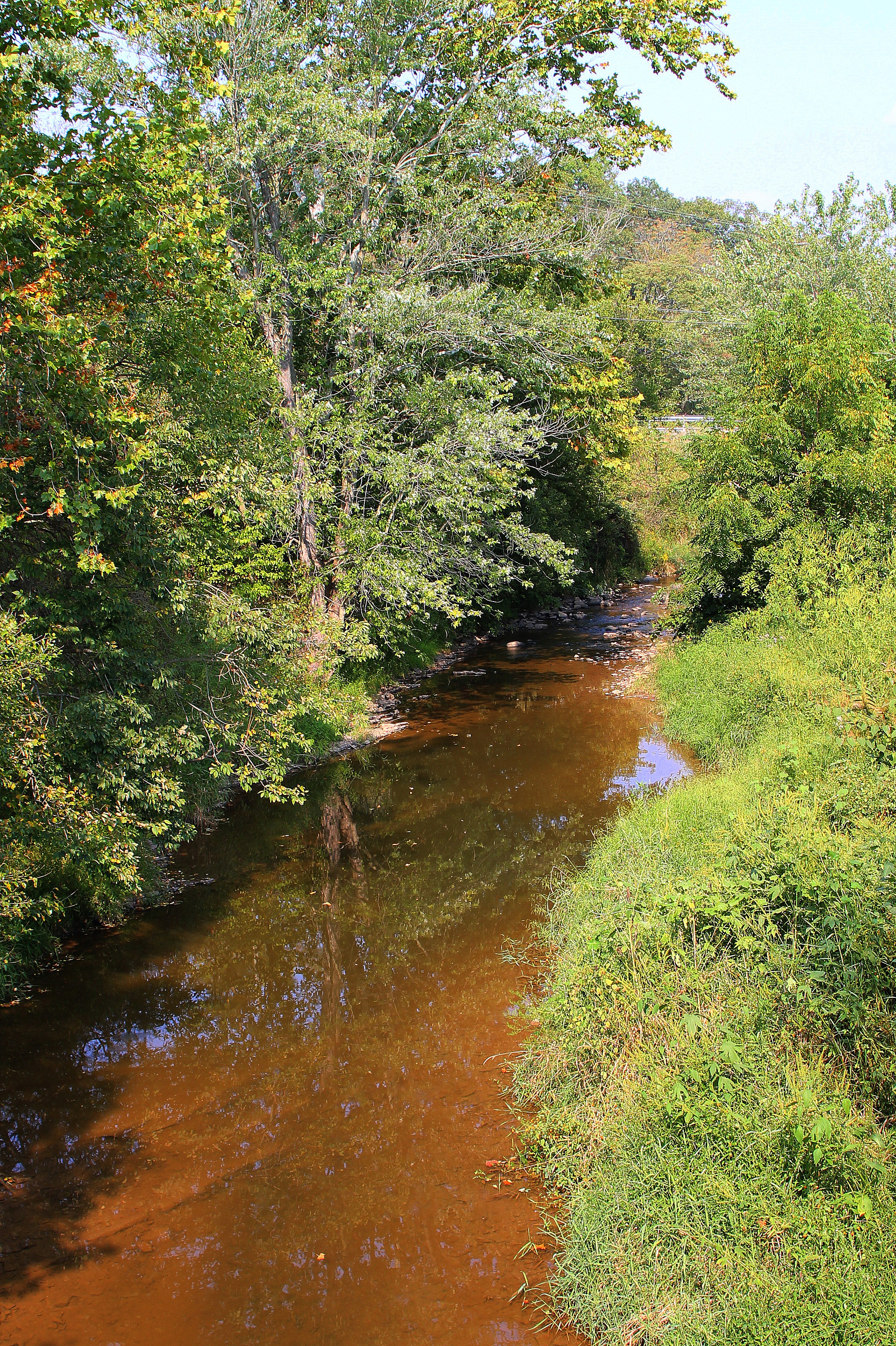
- Schwaben Creek looking upstream

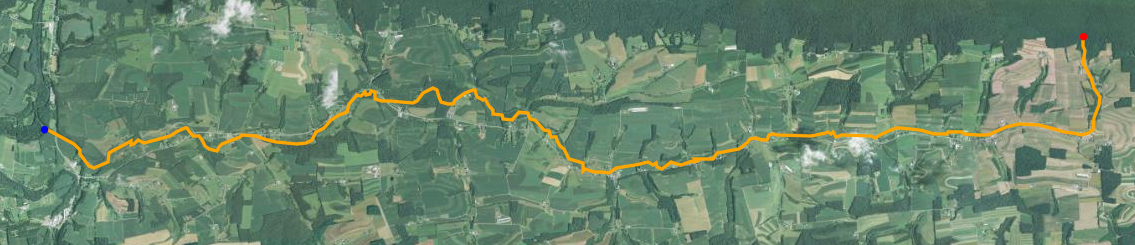
- Satellite map of Schwaben Creek. The red dot is the stream's source and blue dot is its mouth.

Location
- Country: United States
- State: Pennsylvania
- County: Northumberland

Physical characteristics
- Source
  - location: Upper Mahanoy Township, Northumberland County, Pennsylvania
  - coordinates: 40.7179°N 76.6134°W
  - elevation: 800 feet (240 m)
- Mouth
  - location: Mahanoy Creek in Jackson Township, Northumberland County, Pennsylvania
  - coordinates: 40.7183°N 76.7933°W
  - elevation: 480 feet (150 m)
- Length: 12.4 mi (20.0 km)
- Basin size: 22.48 sq mi (58.2 km^{2})

Basin features
- Tributaries
  - left: Middle Creek, Mouse Creek

Schwaben Creek is a tributary of Mahanoy Creek in Northumberland County, Pennsylvania, in the United States. Schwaben Creek is approximately 12.4 miles (20.0 km) long. The creek has two named tributaries, which both join Schwaben Creek fairly close to its mouth. The tributaries are called Middle Creek and Mouse Creek. Schwaben Creek flows through Upper Mahanoy Township, Washington Township, and Jackson Township. Nearly all of the creek's watershed is devoted to agricultural land and forests, although there is some development. Painted furniture was also made in the Schwaben Creek valley in the 18th and 19th centuries. The creek is in the ridge-and-valley geographical province.

== Course ==
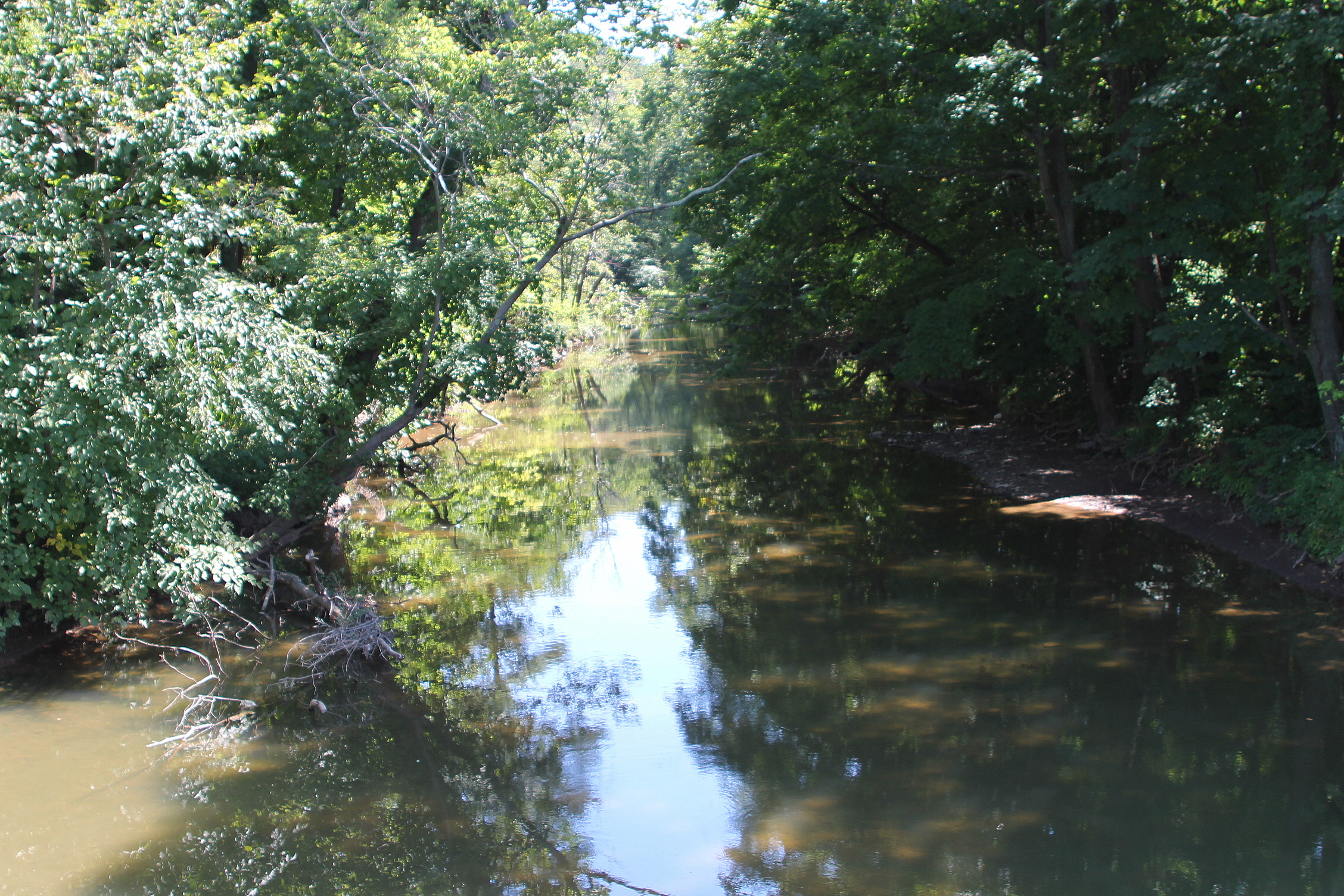
Schwaben Creek in its lower reaches

Schwaben Creek starts in Mahanoy Township, south of Line Mountain. The creek flows westward through a valley, going past the communities of Leck Kill and Greenbrier before exiting Mahanoy Township. Upon exiting Mahanoy Township, Schwaben Creek flows into Washington Township. Shortly after entering Washington Township, the creek flows northwest to pass by the Himmels Church, where it picks up its tributary Middle Creek. It then flows westward past the community of Rebuck, and the Rebuck Church before turning southwest and then west again. The creek's valley begins getting wider as it passes St. Peters Church and leaves Washington Township. Schwaben Creek then enters Jackson Township, where it bends southwards, picking up Mouse Creek at the community of Red Cross. The creek then turns northwest and flows under Pennsylvania Route 225 to enter Mahanoy Creek.

=== Tributaries ===
Middle Creek is one tributary of Schwaben Creek. Middle Creek flows into Schwaben Creek approximately three quarters of the way from the source to the mouth. Mouse Creek is another tributary of Schwaben Creek. It has a drainage area of 7.1 square miles. The creek joins Schwaben Creek about half a mile from the latter creek's confluence with Mahanoy Creek.

== Watershed ==
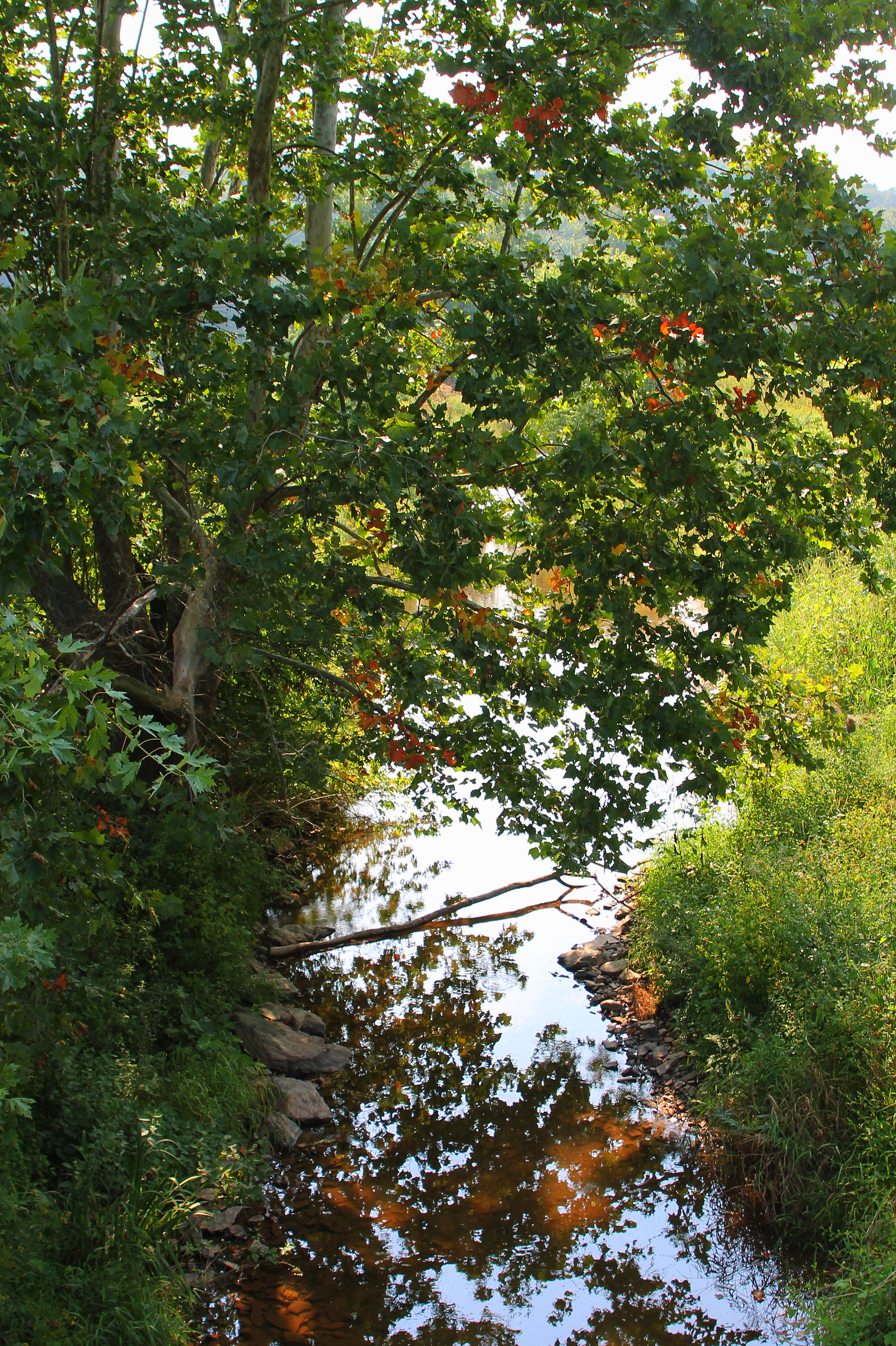
Schwaben Creek looking downstream in September 2015 in its middle reaches

Townships in the Schwaben Creek watershed include Washington Township and Upper Mahanoy Township. The total area of the creek's watershed is 22.48 square miles. The watershed has a total of 47.7 miles (76.8 km) stream distance.

Approximately 55% of the land in the Schwaben Creek watershed is devoted to agriculture. An additional 41% of the land consists of forests. 3% of the land in the watershed is termed "low-intensity development" by the Environmental Protection Agency.

2,963 acres (1,199 ha) of the Schwaben Creek watershed consist of pastures and similar land. 5,019 acres (2,031 ha) of the watershed are devoted to cropland. 5,950 acres (2,408 ha) are devoted to forest. 378 acres (153 ha) are devoted to low-intensity development. 49 acres (20 ha) of the watershed are devoted to unpaved roads. 20 acres (8 ha) are labeled as "transition" by the Environmental Protection Agency. 7 acres (3 ha) of the watershed consist of wetlands.

The Himmel's Church Covered Bridge crosses Schwaben Creek at Rebuck. It was built in 1874.

== Hydrology ==
A total of 30,085 pounds (13,646 kg) of sediment flow through Schwaben Creek per day. This equates to 10,980,800 pounds (4,980,800 kg) per year. 25,561 pounds (11,594 kg) per day comes from cropland and 2,618 pounds (1,188 kg) per day come from stream banks. 835 pounds (379 kg) per day come from pastures, 701 pounds (318 kg) per day comes from forests, and 310 pounds (140 kg) per day comes from unpaved roads. Land with low intensity development and land in transition are the smallest contributors of sediment to Schwaben Creek, contributing 45 pounds (20 kg) and 15 pounds (6.8 kg) per day, respectively.

The average annual rainfall over a 19-year period in the Schwaben Creek watershed is 39.3 inches (1,000 mm). The average annual runoff over a 19-year period in the watershed is 3.11 inches (79 mm).

Almost all of the streams in the Schwaben Creek watershed are considered "impaired" by the Pennsylvania Department of Environmental Protection. The exception is the headwaters of Schwaben Creek's tributary, Middle Creek.

Schwaben Creek, along with Little Mahanoy Creek, are the only tributaries of Mahanoy Creek that are not affected by the mining industry.

== Geography and geology ==
The average elevation in the Schwaben Creek watershed is 819 feet (250 m) above sea level. The creek and its entire watershed is located in the ridge-and-valley physiographic province. The rocks on the surface of the creek's watershed are primarily interbedded sedimentary rock. The main soil group is the C group.

Erosion channels are present in impaired parts of the streams in the Schwaben Creek watershed. The streambanks of many streams in the watershed are also eroded.

A rock formation consisting of coarse white or light gray sandstone on top of a layer of buff and yellow colored rock passes through the Schwaben Creek watershed.

== History ==
Schwaben Creek used to also be known as Himmels Creek, or Greenbriar Creek.

Schwaben Creek takes its name from the German region of Swabia (German: Schwaben). The name reflects the homeland of the area's settlers. A similarly named, but otherwise unrelated, Swabia Creek exists in Berks and Lehigh Counties, Pennsylvania, about 75 miles east of Schwaben Creek.

A large number of furniture pieces were made in the Schwaben Creek valley in the very late 18th century and early 1800s. The furniture was made by Pennsylvania German inhabitants, including Johannes Mayer. The types of furniture included blanket chests, chests of drawers, and cupboards. The 2013 book Encyclopedia of American Folk Art called the furniture from the Schwaben Creek valley "the most exuberant and unique paint-decorated furniture".

An eastward-running road between Sunbury and Paxtang Road (also known as Tulpehocken Road) was laid out in 1788. The road was 10 miles (16 km) long and was built by Andrew Reitz, Frederick Knoebel, George Pfeiffer, John Nicholas Hettrick, John Nicholas Snyder, and Michael Roth.

Schwaben Creek has been recognized as an impaired watershed since 2002.

== Plants and animals ==
Schwaben Creek is stocked with trout each year between February 15 and July 31. Livestock have access to parts of the creek. There are a total of twenty known species of fish in the creek near the community of Red Cross.

There are few or no riparian buffers in the parts of Schwaben Creek that are in agricultural land.

== See also ==
- Zerbe Run, next tributary of Mahanoy Creek going upstream
- List of rivers of Pennsylvania
- List of tributaries of Mahanoy Creek
