= Rebuck =

Rebuck may refer to:

- Gail Rebuck (born 1952), British publisher
- Rebuck, Pennsylvania, an unincorporated community in Northumberland County, Pennsylvania, United States
