= Rattling Run =

Rattling Run may refer to:

- Rattling Run (Catawissa Creek)
- Rattling Run (Little Mahanoy Creek)
