= Rattling Run (Little Mahanoy Creek tributary) =

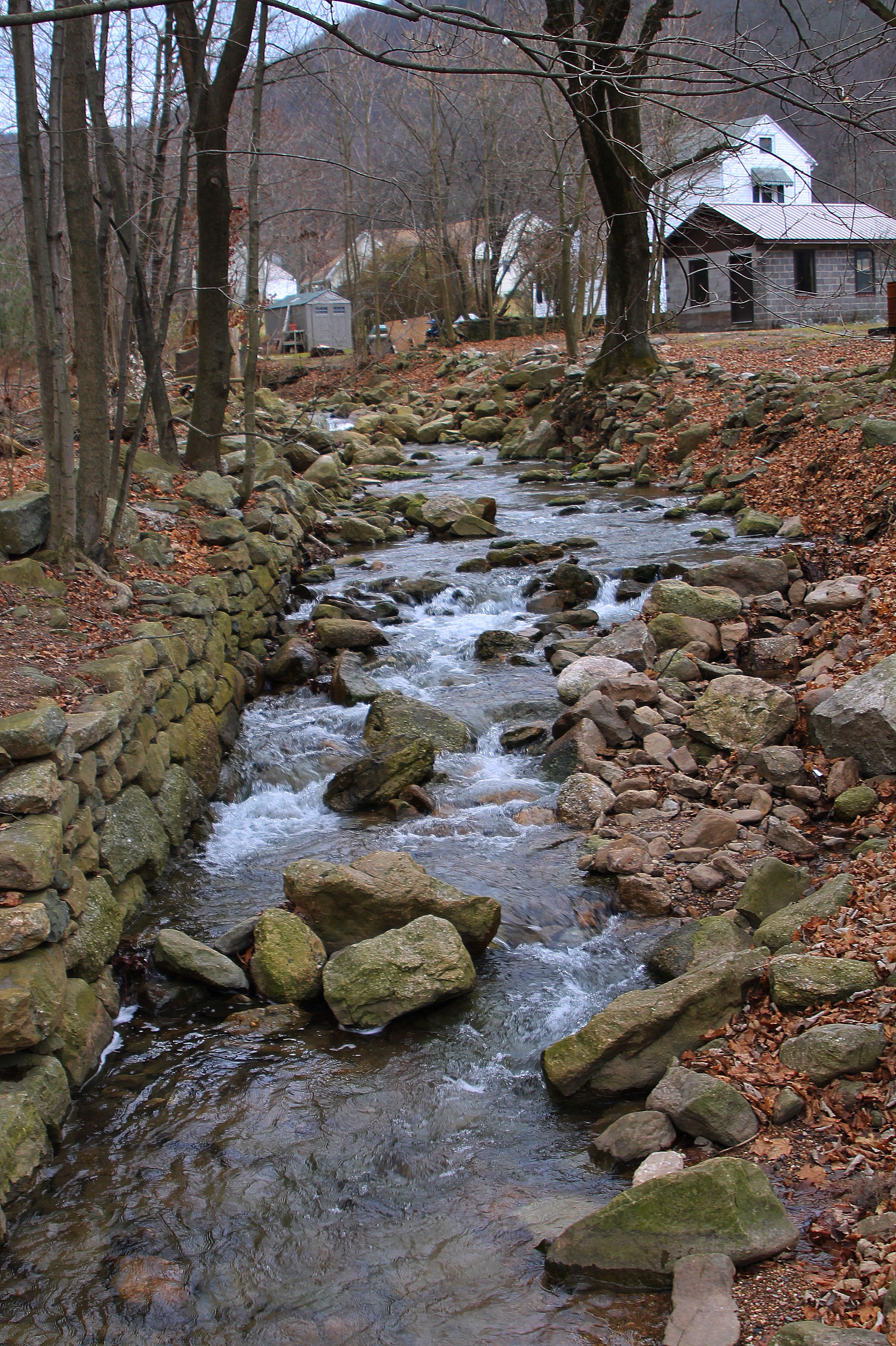
- Rattling Run looking upstream in Gordon

Physical characteristics
- Source
  - elevation: 1,460 ft (450 m)
- Mouth
  - location: Little Mahanoy Creek
  - coordinates: 40°45′10″N 76°20′22″W
  - elevation: 810 ft (250 m)
- Length: 2.3 mi (3.7 km)
- Basin size: 2.75 sq mi (7.1 km^{2})

Basin features
- Progression: Little Mahanoy Creek → Mahanoy Creek → Susquehanna River → Chesapeake Bay

Rattling Run is a tributary of Little Mahanoy Creek in Schuylkill County, Pennsylvania, in the United States. It is approximately 2.3 miles (3.7 km) long and flows through Butler Township and Gordon. The watershed of the stream has an area of 2.75 square miles (7.1 km^{2}). The stream is not designated as an impaired waterbody and is several miles from the Western Middle Anthracite Field. The Gordon Reservoir is located within its watershed. The watershed of Rattling Run is a Coldwater Fishery and a Migratory Fishery.

== Course ==
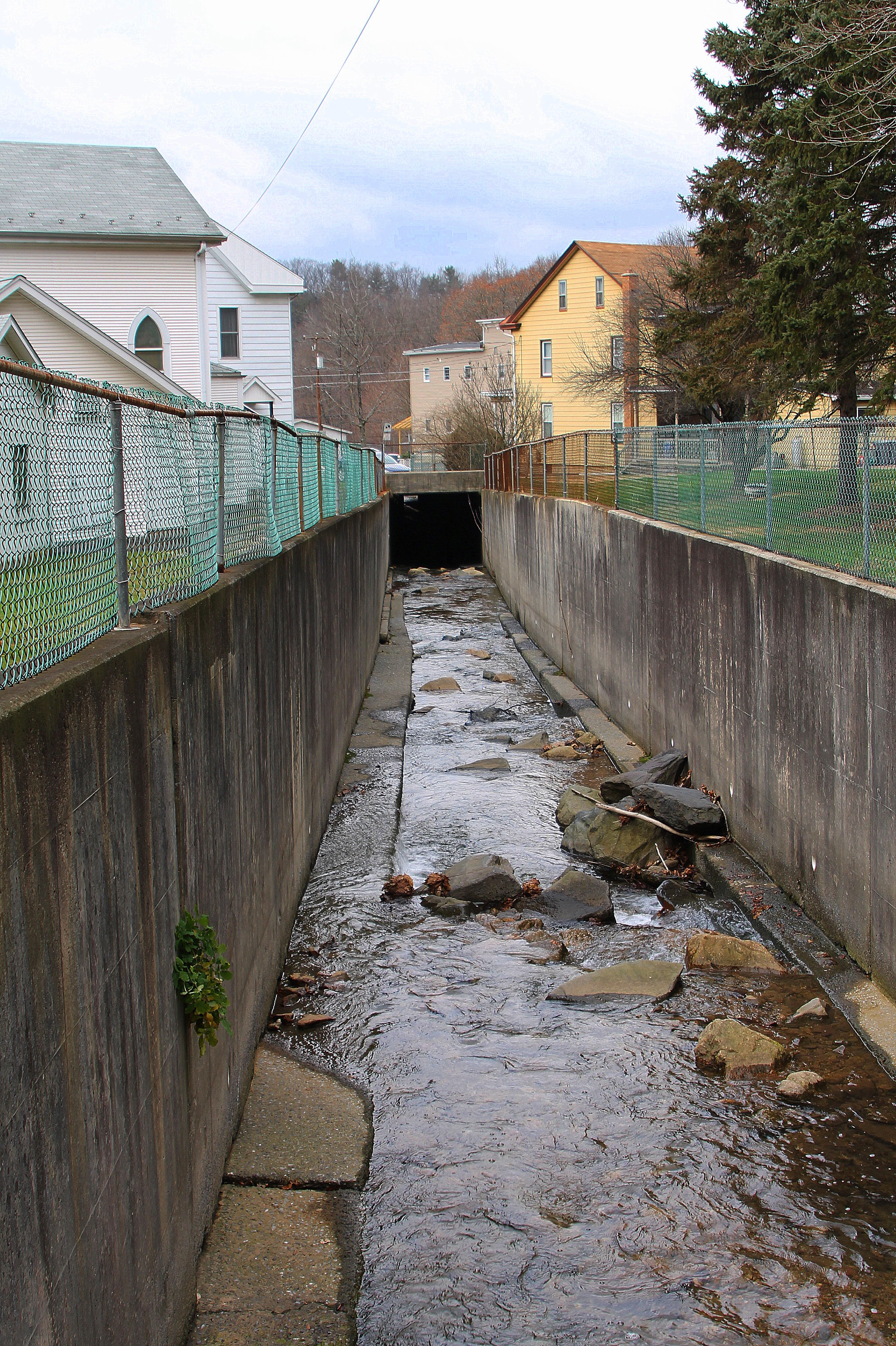
Rattling Run looking downstream in Gordon

Rattling Run begins on a mountain in Butler Township. It flows west-southwest for a few tenths of a mile before turning northwest and flowing through the Gordon Reservoir. The stream then turns west-southwest for several tenths of a mile, entering a valley and flowing alongside Highridge Park Road/Gordon Mountain Road. It then turns northwest for several tenths of a mile before turning north-northwest and entering Gordon. Here, it leaves its valley and continues flowing north-northwest. After a few tenths of a mile, it reaches its confluence with Little Mahanoy Creek.

Rattling Run joins Little Mahanoy Creek 0.32 miles (0.51 km) upstream of its mouth.

== Hydrology ==
Rattling Run is not designated as an impaired waterbody. In general, the mouth of Rattling Run was found to have a slightly lower pH and slightly lower nutrient concentrations than Little Mahanoy Creek.

The discharge of Rattling Run was measured to be 9.61 cubic feet per second (0.272 m^{3}/s) in March 2001 and 1.99 cubic feet per second (0.056 m^{3}/s) in August 2001. The concentrations of dissolved oxygen were 12.3 and 8.3 milligrams per liter (0.0123 and 0.0083 oz/cu ft), respectively. In March 2001, the pH of the stream was 5.7 and the net alkalinity concentration was 3 milligrams per liter (0.0030 oz/cu ft), while in August 2001, the pH was 6.5.

The concentration of dissolved aluminum in Rattling Run was 0.14 milligrams per liter (0.00014 oz/cu ft) in March 2001 and 0.01 milligrams per liter (1.00×10^{−5} oz/cu ft). The concentrations of dissolved manganese and iron in the stream were 0.09 and 0.01 milligrams per liter (8.99×10^{−5} and 1.00×10^{−5} oz/cu ft) in March 2001 and 0.01 and 0.01 milligrams per liter (1.00×10^{−5} and 1.00×10^{−5} oz/cu ft) in August 2001.

The dissolved nitrate concentration in Rattling Run was 0.10 milligrams per liter (0.000100 oz/cu ft) in March 2001 and 0.18 milligrams per liter (0.00018 oz/cu ft) in August 2001. The dissolved phosphorus concentration was 0.03 milligrams per liter (3.0×10^{−5} oz/cu ft) in March and less than 0.01 milligrams per liter (1.00×10^{−5} oz/cu ft) in August. The dissolved sulfate concentration was 7 and 6 milligrams per liter (0.0070 and 0.0060 oz/cu ft) in March and August 2001, respectively.

== Geography and geology ==
The elevation near the mouth of Rattling Run is 810 feet (250 m) above sea level. The elevation of the stream's source is 1,460 feet (450 m) above sea level.

Rattling Run is a few miles to the south of the Western Middle Anthracite Field. The stream has experienced some erosion along the sides and bottom of its channel.

== Watershed ==
The watershed of Rattling Run has an area of 2.75 square miles (7.1 km^{2}). The mouth of the stream is in the United States Geological Survey quadrangle of Ashland. However, its source is in the quadrangle of Minersville.

A reservoir known as the Gordon Reservoir is on Rattling Run. In 1970, it was owned by the Butler Township Water Company.

The designated use for Rattling Run is aquatic life.

Rattling Run flooded during Hurricane Agnes in April 1972, causing $350,000 in damage and significant damage to nearby structures.

== History ==
Rattling Run was entered into the Geographic Names Information System on August 2, 1979. Its identifier in the Geographic Names Information System is 1184693.

Rattling Run was stocked with 1000 adult and yearling rainbow trout at least once in the early 1900s. Improvements were made to the stream in 1937. Flood control proposals for Rattling Run in Gordon were made in 1976.

A steel culvert bridge carrying Gordon Mountain Road over Rattling Run was built in 1959 and is 24.0 feet (7.3 m) long.

In June 1991, it was reported that raw sewage was being piped from homes directly into Rattling Run and Little Mahanoy Creek.

== Biology ==
In 2001, neither fish nor macroinvertebrates were observed in Rattling Run at Gordon. The stream is classified as a Coldwater Fishery and a Migratory Fishery.

== See also ==
- List of rivers of Pennsylvania
- List of tributaries of Mahanoy Creek
