= Mouse Creek (Schwaben Creek tributary) =

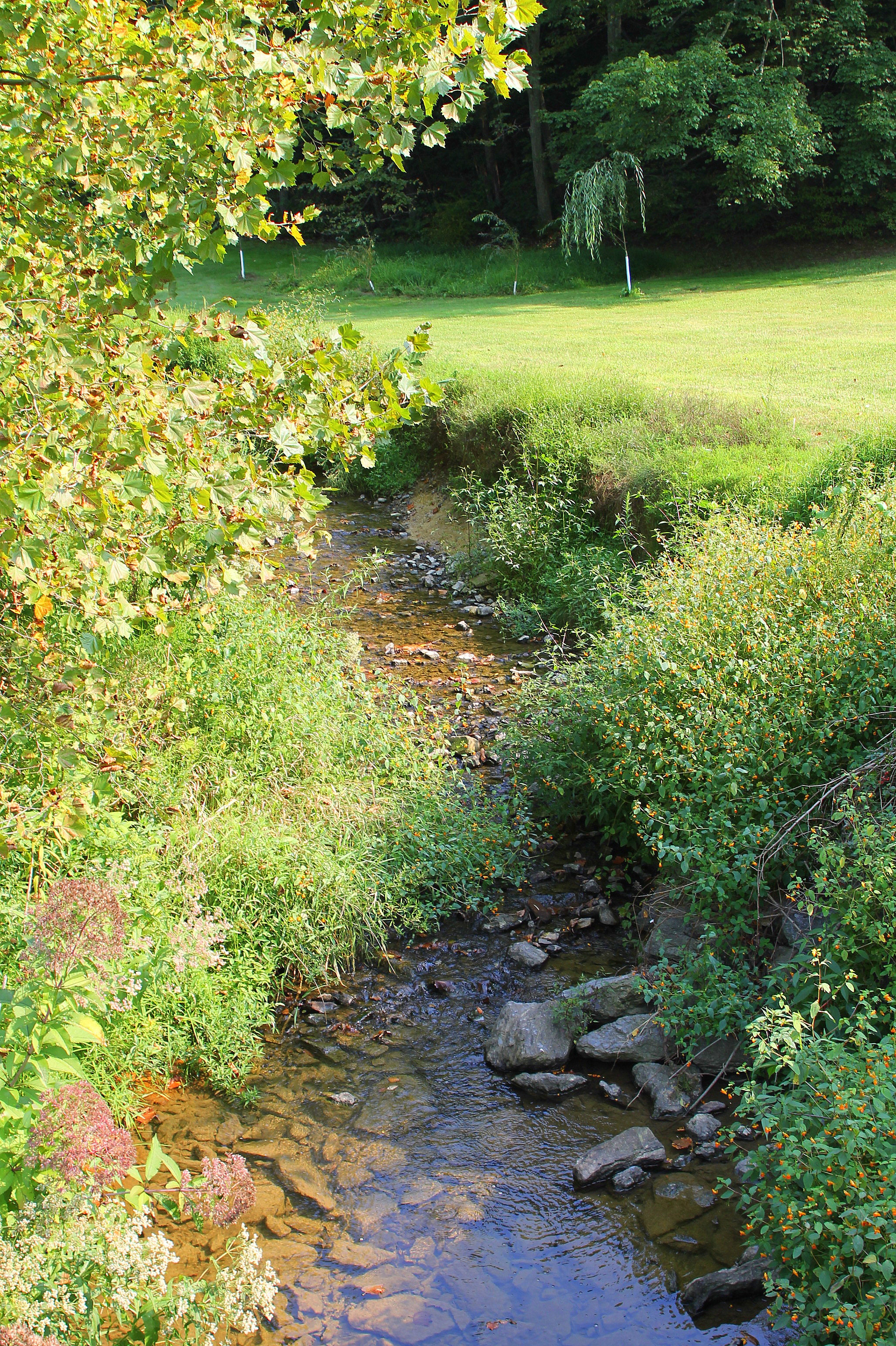
- Mouse Creek looking upstream

Physical characteristics
- Source
  - location: Jordan Township, Northumberland County, Pennsylvania
  - elevation: 850 ft (260 m)
- Mouth
  - location: Schwaben Creek in Washington Township, Northumberland County, Pennsylvania
  - coordinates: 40°42′49″N 76°47′10″W
  - elevation: 476 ft (145 m)
- Length: 5.6 mi (9.0 km)
- Basin size: 7.19 sq mi (18.6 km^{2})

Basin features
- Progression: Schwaben Creek → Mahanoy Creek → Susquehanna River → Chesapeake Bay
- Tributaries
  - left: three unnamed tributaries
  - right: two unnamed tributaries

Mouse Creek is a tributary of Schwaben Creek in Northumberland County, Pennsylvania, in the United States. It is approximately 5.6 miles (9.0 km) long and flows through Jordan Township, Washington Township, and Jackson Township. The watershed of the creek has an area of 7.19 square miles (18.6 km^{2}). The creek and its tributaries are not designated as impaired waterbodies. Its watershed is at least partially in the ridge and valley physiographic province. The main land use in the upper reaches of the creek's drainage basin are forested land and agricultural land, but other land uses exist as well. A number of bridges have been constructed across the creek.

== Course ==
Mouse Creek begins in a valley in Jordan Township. It flows west-southwest for several tenths of a mile before turning west for a few tenths of a mile. It then turns west-northwest before turning west. After more than a mile, it turns north, receiving two unnamed tributaries from the left. The creek then passes through a water gap and enters Washington Township before entering another valley, where it receives an unnamed tributary from the right. The creek then turns west-southwest for a few tenths of a mile before turning west-northwest for several tenths of a mile and entering Washington Township. Here, it crosses Pennsylvania Route 225 and turns north, flowing through a much narrower valley alongside Pennsylvania Route 225 and receiving two unnamed tributaries (one from the left and one from the right). The creek then turns north-northeast for several tenths of a mile, crossing Pennsylvania Route 225 and reaching its confluence with Schwaben Creek.

Mouse Creek joins Schwaben Creek 0.48 miles (0.77 km) upstream of its mouth.

== Hydrology and climate ==
No stream segment in the watershed of Mouse Creek is designated as an impaired waterbody. The headwaters reach of the creek was selected as the reference watershed for the Dalmatia Creek total maximum daily load.

In 2001, the water temperature of Mouse Creek at Urban ranged from 5.3 to 19.4 °C (41.5 to 66.9 °F) in two measurements. The discharge ranged from 0.52 to 4.3 cubic feet per second (0.015 to 0.122 m^{3}/s) and the specific conductance ranged from 250 to 350 micro-siemens per centimeter at 25 °C (77 °F). The creek's pH was slightly alkaline, ranging from 7.7 to 8.4 and the water hardness ranged from 75.1 to 177 milligrams per liter (0.0750 to 0.1768 oz/cu ft).

In 2001, the concentration of dissolved oxygen in Mouse Creek at Urban ranged from 9.4 to 11.9 milligrams per liter (0.0094 to 0.0119 oz/cu ft) in two measurements. The carbon dioxide concentration ranged from 0.4 to 4.7 milligrams per liter (0.00040 to 0.00469 oz/cu ft) and the phosphorus concentration ranged between 10.0 and 23.0 milligrams per liter (0.0100 and 0.0230 oz/cu ft). The sulfate concentration ranged from 15.0 to 20.0 milligrams per liter (0.0150 to 0.0200 oz/cu ft). The silica concentration ranged between 6.00 and 7.40 milligrams per liter (0.00599 and 0.00739 oz/cu ft). The concentrations of fluoride and chloride in the creek's filtered water ranged from 0.10 to 0.10 milligrams per liter (0.000100 to 0.000100 oz/cu ft) and 10.8 to 15.1 milligrams per liter (0.0108 to 0.0151 oz/cu ft).

In 2001, the concentrations of recoverable magnesium and calcium in Moue Creek at Urban ranged from 3.6 to 6.5 milligrams per liter (0.0036 to 0.0065 oz/cu ft) and 24.0 to 59.0 milligrams per liter (0.0240 to 0.0589 oz/cu ft). The concentrations of recoverable sodium and potassium ranged from 5.4 to 7.3 milligrams per liter (0.0054 to 0.0073 oz/cu ft) and 1.1 to 1.7 milligrams per liter (0.0011 to 0.0017 oz/cu ft). Numerous other metalloids and metals, such as alkali metals, alkaline earth metals, lanthanides, transition metals, and other metals have been observed in the creek

The annual sediment load in the upper reaches of the watershed of Mouse Creek is 6,644,800 pounds (3,014,000 kg). Cropland is the largest contributor, at 6,115,000 pounds (2,774,000 kg) per year. It is followed by hay/pastures at 232,400 pounds (105,400 kg) per year, low-intensity development at 123,000 pounds (56,000 kg) per year, forested land at 76,200 pounds (34,600 kg) annually, transitional land at 60,000 pounds (27,000 kg) annually, and streambanks at 38,200 pounds (17,300 kg) per year.

The peak annual discharge of the creek has a 10 percent chance of reaching 1,150 cubic feet per second (33 m^{3}/s) and a 2 percent chance of reaching 2,650 cubic feet per second (75 m^{3}/s). It has a 1 percent chance of reaching 3,600 cubic feet per second (100 m^{3}/s) and a 0.2 percent chance of reaching 7,600 cubic feet per second (220 m^{3}/s).

== Geography, geology, and climate ==
The elevation near the mouth of Mouse Creek is 476 feet (145 m) above sea level. The elevation of the creek's source is 850 feet (260 m) above sea level. The highest elevations in the creek's watershed are more than 1,100 feet (340 m) above sea level.

At least part of the watershed of Mouse Creek is in the ridge and valley physiographic province. The surface geology in this part of the watershed consists mostly of a metamorphic rock known as schist, which does not have any significant effect on the sediment loads in the watershed.

A mountain known as Hooflander Mountain passes through the watershed of Mouse Creek, as does part of Fisher Ridge. A number of quarries of bluish-black limestone existed in the vicinity of the creek by the late 1800s.

The average annual rate of rainfall in the upper reaches of Mouse Creek is 39.30 inches (99.8 cm). The average annual rate of runoff is 2.96 inches (7.5 cm).

== Watershed ==
The watershed of Mouse Creek has an area of 7.19 square miles (18.6 km^{2}). The mouth of the creek is in the United States Geological Survey quadrangle of Pillow. However, its source is in the quadrangle of Klingerstown. The mouth of the creek is located within 1 mile (1.6 km) of Red Cross. The watershed is in the lower reaches of the Mahanoy Creek drainage basin.

Mouse Creek is one of the major streams in the watershed of Mahanoy Creek.

In the upper 2.7 square miles (7.0 km^{2}) of the watershed of Mouse Creek, the dominant land use is forested land, which makes up 52.0 percent of the land area. Agricultural land, including cropland and hay/pasture land, occupies 42.0 percent of this part of the watershed. Only 5.6 percent is low-intensity development, and only 0.3 percent is transitional land.

== History ==
Mouse Creek was entered into the Geographic Names Information System on August 2, 1979. Its identifier in the Geographic Names Information System is 1181976.

A steel stringer/multi-beam or girder bridge carrying T-355 over Mouse Creek was repaired in 1994 3 miles (4.8 km) south of Dornsife and is 25.9 feet (7.9 m) long. A concrete tee beam bridge carrying State Route 3003 over the creek was built in 1922 2 miles (3.2 km) southeast of Red Cross and is 23.0 feet (7.0 m) long. A two-span steel culvert bridge carrying State Route 3003 over the creek was built 0.5 miles (0.80 km) south of Urban in 1933 and repaired in 1979. This bridge is 23.0 feet (7.0 m) long. A 32.2-foot (9.8 m) long steel stringer/multi-beam or girder bridge carrying State Route 3010 across the creek in Red Cross was constructed in 1946 and repaired in 1973.

A steel stringer/multi-beam or girder bridge with a length of 23.0 feet (7.0 m) was built over the creek in 1954 east of Herndon and was repaired in 1978. A concrete culvert bridge carrying State Route 3005 was built over the creek 1.5 miles (2.4 km) southeast of Urban in 1974 and is 21.0 feet (6.4 m) long. A concrete culvert bridge across the creek was built for Pennsylvania Route 225 in 1986 in Red Cross and is 24.0 feet (7.3 m) long. Another bridge of the same type and carrying the same highway was built over the creek in 1991 2 miles (3.2 km) north of Mandata and is 24.0 feet (7.3 m) long.

Mouse Creek experienced flooding in June 1972, as did many other streams in the area.

== Biology ==
Mouse Creek is designated as a Trout Stocked Fishery.

Mouse Creek has significant forested riparian buffers, especially in its headwaters. The ridgelines at the boundaries the watershed are also extensively forested. Contour cropping is practiced within the creek's watershed.

== See also ==
- Middle Creek (Schwaben Creek), next tributary of Schwaben Creek going upstream
- List of rivers of Pennsylvania
- List of tributaries of Mahanoy Creek
