= Little Mahanoy Creek =

Creek in Pennsylvania, US

Coordinates: 40°45′16″N 76°20′40″W

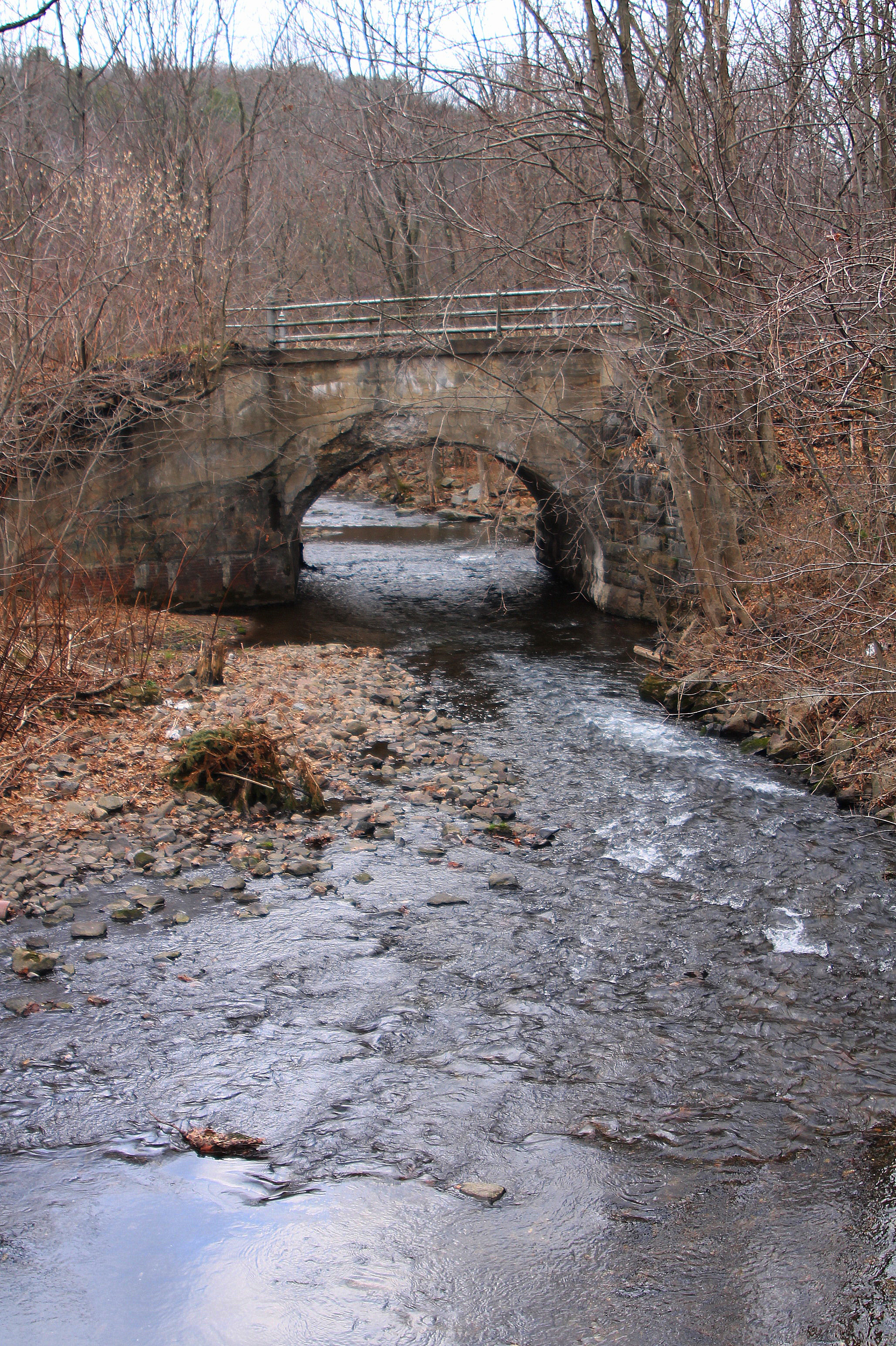
Little Mahanoy Creek looking downstream in its lower reaches in Gordon

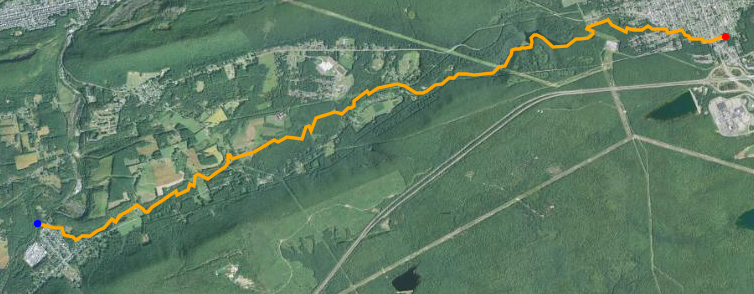
Satellite map of Little Mahanoy Creek. The red dot is the stream's source and blue dot is its mouth.

Little Mahanoy Creek is a 7.5 miles (12.1 km) tributary of Mahanoy Creek in Schuylkill County, Pennsylvania. It starts in the borough of Frackville and joins Mahanoy Creek in the borough of Gordon. Its one named tributary is Rattling Run. The creek's watershed has an area of 11.6 square miles (30 km^{2}). Its watershed is not affected by mining. Compounds found in the waters of the creek include nitrogen, phosphorus, orthophosphates, phosphates, nitrates, and ammonia.

== Course ==
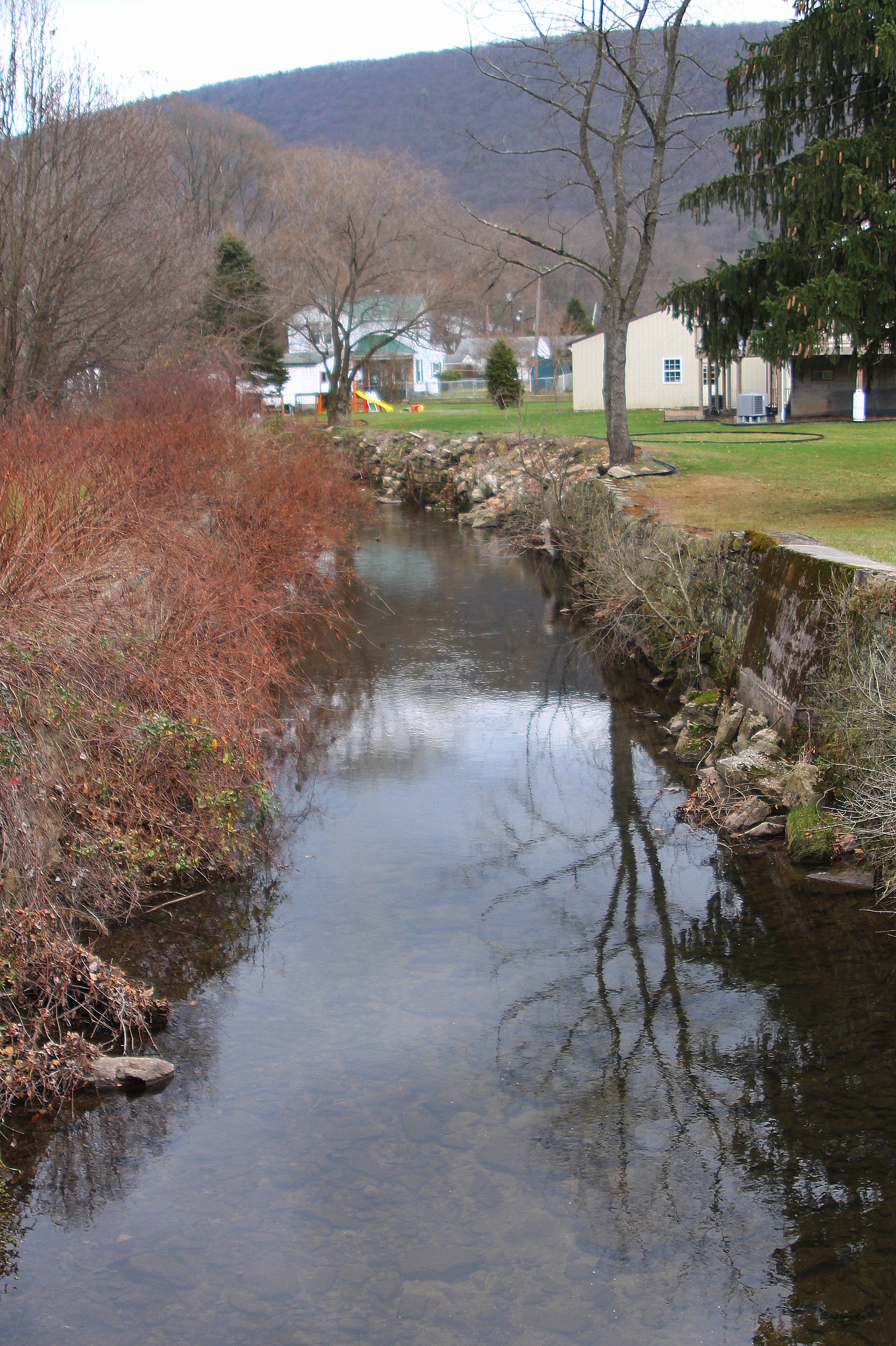
Little Mahanoy Creek looking upstream in its lower reaches in Gordon

Little Mahanoy Creek starts in Frackville and heads westward past a pond or small lake. It then drops steeply through a steep narrow valley between Ashland Mountain and Broad Mountain, which abruptly widens out a short distance downstream. The creek then flows on the northern edge of Broad Mountain to the borough of Gordon, where it picks up Rattling Run before flowing into Mahanoy Creek.

=== Tributaries ===
Rattling Run flows into Little Mahanoy Creek in Gordon, not far from Little Mahanoy Creek's mouth. It rises from springs on the slopes of Broad Mountain.

== Watershed ==
The watershed of Little Mahanoy Creek has an area of 11.6 square miles (30 km^{2}). Areas in the watershed include the southern side of Ashland Mountain between Frackville and the creek's mouth.

== Geography and geology ==
Little Mahanoy Creek flows through a valley between Ashland Mountain and Broad Mountain. The valley is very steep and narrow near the creek's headwaters, but becomes broader further downstream, being close to 2.0 miles (3.2 km) wide at the mouth. The creek lies over a layer of red shale. Below the shale is a layer of hard and compact sandstone, which has some black, carbon-containing matter in it.

== Hydrology ==
Little Mahanoy Creek is one of the only tributaries of Mahanoy Creek that is not affected by mining in the area. The other is Schwaben Creek.

The average discharge of Little Mahanoy Creek, as measured in late 2008 and early 2009 2.3 cubic feet per second and 14.9 cubic feet per second, with an average of 8.02 cubic feet per second. The discharge steadily increased between September 2008 and April 2009. In the same time period, the water temperature ranged between 39.2 and 54.3 °F (4.0 and 12.4 °C). The average temperature during that time was 46.2 °F (7.9 °C). The measurement in September 2008 was the highest and the measurement in March 2009 was the lowest. The electrical conductivity of the creek 0.169 to 0.295 thousandths of a siemens. The average conductivity was 0.238 thousands of a siemens.

The concentration of dissolved oxygen in the waters of Little Mahanoy Creek ranged between 9.8 milligrams per liter and 11.8 milligrams per liter in late 2008 and early 2009. The average concentration was 11.2 milligrams per liter. The creek is typically alkaline, with pH levels ranging from 7.4 in late 2008 to 8.1 in March 2009. The average pH level between September 2008 and April 2009 was 7.6. In late 2008 and early 2009, the concentration of suspended sediment ranged from 2 to 9 milligrams per liter, with an average of 4.5 milligrams per liter. The total concentration of suspended solids in the creek was usually less than 5 milligrams per liter, but was 6 milligrams per liter on April 16, 2009.

The total concentration of orthophosphates in Mahanoy Creek between September 2008 and April 2009 ranged from 0.029 to 0.112, with an average of 0.055 milligrams per liter. The concentration consistently decreased between late 2008 and early 2009. The concentration of phosphorus ranged between 0.113 milligrams per liter and 0.044 milligrams per liter, with an average of 0.083 milligrams per liter. The concentration of nitrogen ranged from 1.39 milligrams per liter to 2.61 milligrams per liter, with an average of 0.93 milligrams per liter. The concentration of nitrates ranged from 1.13 to 2.14 milligrams per liter, with an average of 0.78 milligrams per liter. The concentration of ammonia was consistently less than 0.02 milligrams per liter between November 2008 and April 2009.

== History ==
A sawmill was built on Little Mahanoy Creek in 1814. In 1875, the borough of Ashland purchased a tract of land on the creek in Butler Township, two miles downstream of the creek's headwaters. In 1882, some people attempted to pump water from Little Mahanoy Creek to create a reservoir and pipe the water to those who needed it. Little Mahanoy Creek was polluted in 1915. Around that time, it was a source of water for the borough of Ashland.

In 1936, the Frackville Sewerage Company attempted to create a sewer in Frackville, but after a controversy about paying for the sewer, it was stopped, causing the pumphouse to discharge into Little Mahanoy Creek. A number of local court cases resulted from this. Discharging sewage into the creek was banned by 1938. In 2011, there was an Easter egg drop in Little Mahanoy Creek. There were plans to make it an annual tradition.

== Fauna ==
Little Mahanoy Creek is a trout stream. It can be fished in year-round. The trout are stocked in the creek. For instance, 600 trout were stocked in 2001. Rainbow trout have also historically been observed in the creek. In 1906, there were 800 fish in the creek, including juvenile fish, yearling fish, and adult fish.

== See also ==
- Crab Run (Mahanoy Creek), next tributary of Mahanoy Creek going downstream
- Shenandoah Creek, next tributary of Mahnaoy Creek going upstream
- List of rivers in Pennsylvania
- List of tributaries of Mahanoy Creek
