= Rebuck, Pennsylvania =

Unincorporated community in Pennsylvania, US

- Unincorporated community
- Location within Pennsylvania
- Coordinates: 40°43′20″N 76°44′08″W
- Country: United States
- State: Pennsylvania
- County: Northumberland
- Township: Washington
- Elevation: 558 ft (170 m)
- Time zone: UTC-5 (Eastern (EST))
  - Summer (DST): UTC-4 (EDT)
- ZIP code: 17867
- Area codes: 272 & 570
- GNIS feature ID: 1204468

Rebuck is an unincorporated community in Northumberland County, Pennsylvania, United States. The community is 10.4 miles (16.7 km) west-southwest of Shamokin. Rebuck has a post office, with ZIP code 17867.
