= Hilsenhoff Biotic Index =

The Hilsenhoff Biotic Index (HBI) is a quantitative method of evaluating the abundance of arthropod fauna in stream ecosystems as a measurement of estimating water quality based on the predetermined pollution tolerances of the observed taxa. This biotic index was created by William Hilsenhoff in 1977 to measure the effects of oxygen depletion in Wisconsin streams resulting from organic or nutrient pollution.

== Calculating the HBI ==
The collection sample should contain 100+ arthropods. A tolerance value of 0 to 10 is assigned to each arthropod species (or genera) based on its known prevalence in stream habitats with varying states of detritus contamination. A highly tolerant species would receive a value of 10, while a species collected only in unaltered streams with high water quality would receive a value of 0. The sum products of the number of individuals in each species (or genera) multiplied by the tolerance of the species is divided by the total number of specimens in the sample to determine the HBI value.

$HBI = \frac{\Sigma (n_i a_i)}{N}$;

where n = number of specimens in taxa; a = tolerance value of taxa; N = total number of specimens in the sample.

Precautions should be taken to account for confounding variables, such as the effects of dominant species over-abundance, seasonal temperature stress, and water currents. Limiting the collection of individuals from each species to a maximum of 10 (10-Max BI) has been shown to minimize the effects of these phenomena on the True BI.

The biotic index is then ranked for water quality and degree of organic pollution, as follows:

Evaluation of Water Quality Using Biotic Index Values
Biotic Index	Water Quality	Degree of Organic Pollution
0.00 - 3.50	Excellent	No apparent organic pollution
3.51 - 4.50	Very Good	Possible slight organic pollution
4.51 - 5.50	Good	Some organic pollution
5.51 - 6.50	Fair	Fairly significant organic pollution
6.51 - 7.50	Fairly Poor	Significant organic pollution
7.51 - 8.50	Poor	Very significant organic pollution
8.51 - 10.00	Very Poor	Severe organic pollution
