= Abandoned mine drainage =

Water pollution from abandoned mines

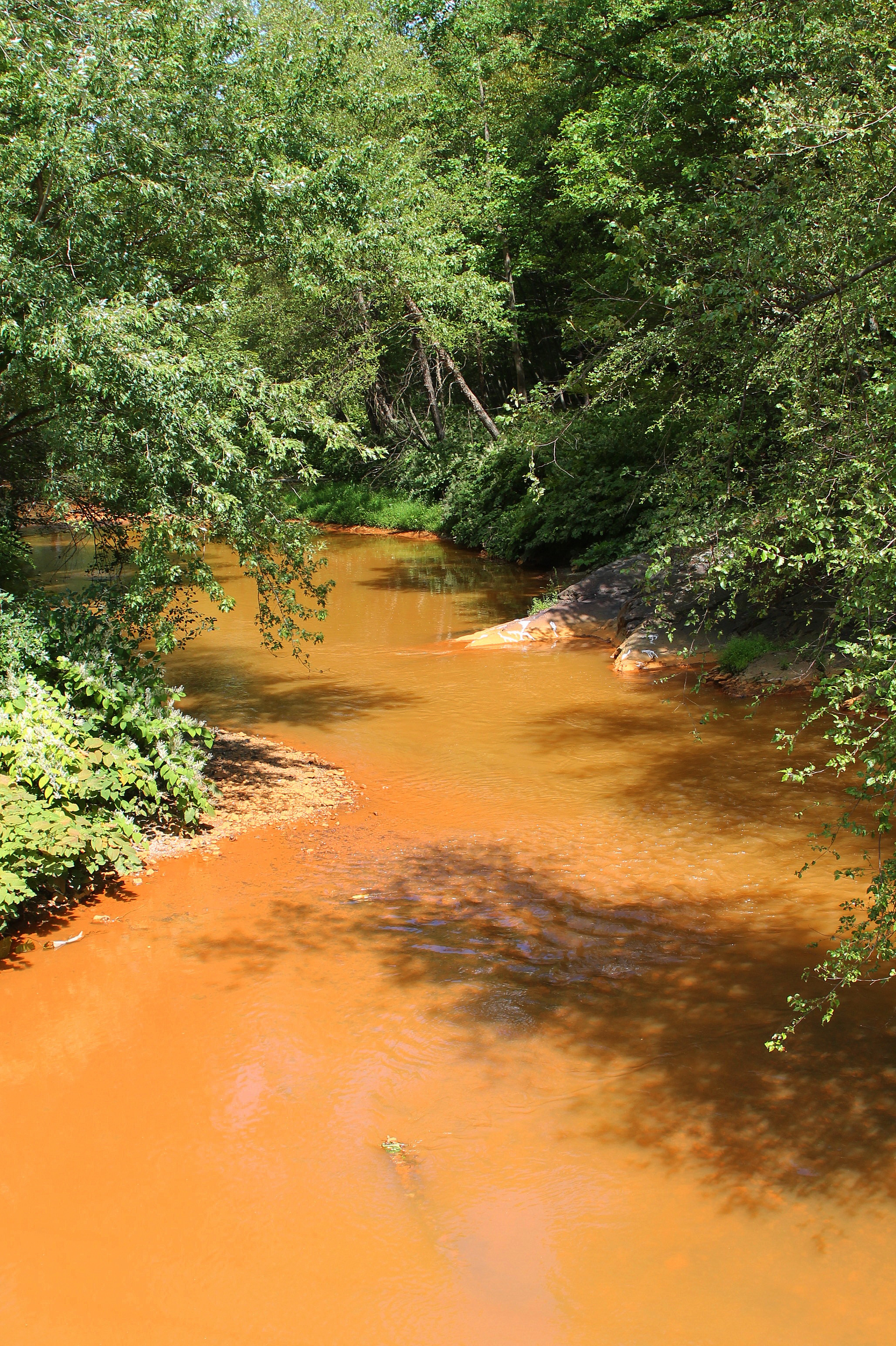
A creek affected by abandoned mine drainage

Abandoned mine drainage (also known as AMD) is a form of water pollution involving water that has been polluted by contact with mines, typically coal mines. Although it is sometimes called "acid mine drainage", not all abandoned mine drainage is acidic.

== Types ==
The most common form of abandoned mine drainage is acid mine drainage, which is highly acidic water coming from mines. Abandoned mine drainage can become acidic when it is exposed to oxygen and sulfur-containing minerals such as pyrite.

Another form of abandoned mine drainage is alkaline mine drainage. This typically occurs in the presence of minerals such as calcite, limestone, or dolomite. The third form of abandoned mine drainage is metal mine drainage, which occurs when large amounts of metals such as lead contaminate mine water.

== Geochemistry ==
The precise chemistry of abandoned mine drainage discharges typically varies. Abandoned mine drainage typically originates in surface mines, deep mines, and "gob piles".

Abandoned mine drainage typically has high concentrations of metals and total dissolved solids. Iron is the most common metal in abandoned mine drainage, but aluminium and manganese occur as well. It may also have a high water temperature and an altered pH, though the characteristics of abandoned mine drainage depend heavily on the area's geochemistry. Other signs of abandoned mine drainage include high sulfate levels and siltation. Acid mine drainage has a pH of less than 7, while alkaline mine drainage has a pH of greater than 7.

The concentrations of metals in abandoned mine drainage can range from several to several thousand parts per million. In Pennsylvania's Coal Region, it has an iron concentration of less than 100 milligrams per liter (0.100 oz/cu ft) and a pH of close to 7.

Abandoned mine drainage can cause affected streams to take on a bright orange color.

== Environmental effects ==
Abandoned mine drainage affects streams worldwide. A 2017 United Nations Environmental Programme (UNEP) report documented "widespread destruction" from mining waste that is released into the environment as a result of dam failures.

Mine drainage is prevalent in the United States state of Pennsylvania, as well as several other states that have historically had large mining industries. In Pennsylvania, nearly 2,500 miles (4,000 km) of streams have been affected by abandoned mine drainage, and more than 7,500 miles (12,100 km) have been affected in the Appalachian Mountains, and more than 10,000 miles (16,000 km) are affected in Pennsylvania and West Virginia.

In one watershed affected by abandoned mine drainage, the value of homes within 200 feet (61 m) of an affected stream decreased by $2500 per 1 acre (0.40 ha), as of 2009.

Algae sometimes coat streams that are affected by abandoned mine drainage, although aquatic plants have difficulty surviving in such streams. The gills of fish are also harmed by the metals in abandoned mine drainage. The eggs of macroinvertebrates and fish are also smothered by the precipitate. Coldwater fish such as trout are especially harmed by abandoned mine drainage.

Abandoned mine drainage also affects the plants and animals in the area surrounding the mine. Mine drainage pollution has been found in sheep that fed near abandoned mines.

== Remedies and applications ==
There are several methods by which abandoned mine drainage can be remedied: passive treatment, active treatment, and land reclamation. Trompes may also be useful in treating abandoned mine drainage.

The natural gas industry has suggested using abandoned mine drainage water in hydraulic fracturing. Proponents of this idea say that it would remove toxic water from the environment while reducing the natural gas industry's need to use water from streams and rivers. However, opponents have said that it would "make a dirty process even dirtier". This has already been done with streams such as an unnamed tributary to Johnson Creek. Abandoned mine drainage solids have shown potential in capturing mercury emissions from coal-fired power plants.

The iron oxide generated by treating abandoned mine drainage can be used as a glaze for pottery.
