= List of places in Pennsylvania: A =

This list of current cities, towns, unincorporated communities, counties, and other recognized places in the U.S. state of Pennsylvania also includes information on the number and names of counties in which the place lies, and its lower and upper Zip Code bounds, if applicable.

Name of place	Number of counties	Principal county	Lower zip code	Upper zip code
Aaronsburg	1	Centre County	16820	
Abbott Township	1	Potter County		
Abbottstown	1	Adams County	17301	
Aberdeen	1	Lancaster County	17022	
Abington	1	Montgomery County	19001	
Abington Township	1	Lackawanna County		
Abington Township	1	Montgomery County		
Abrahams	1	Montgomery County		
Abrahamsville	1	Wayne County	12723	
Abrams	1	Montgomery County		
Academia	1	Juniata County	17082	
Academy Corners	1	Tioga County	16928	
Academy Gardens	1	Philadelphia County		
Acahela	1	Monroe County	18610	
Accomac	1	York County	17406	
Ache	1	Fayette County		
Acheson	1	Washington County	15323	
Acker	1	Perry County		
Ackermanville	1	Northampton County	18010	
Ackworth	1	Chester County		
Acme	1	Washington County		
Acme	1	Westmoreland County	15610	
Acmetonia	1	Allegheny County	15024	
Acosta	1	Somerset County	15520	
Adah	1	Fayette County	15410	
Adams	1	Armstrong County	16218	
Adams	1	Somerset County		
Adams Corner	1	Butler County	16057	
Adams Hill	1	Westmoreland County	15642	
Adams Township	1	Butler County		
Adams Township	1	Cambria County		
Adams Township	1	Snyder County		
Adamsburg	1	Westmoreland County	15611	
Adamsdale	1	Schuylkill County	17972	
Adamstown	2	Berks County	19501	
Adamstown	2	Lancaster County	19501	
Adamsville	1	Crawford County	16110	
Adamsville	1	York County		
Addingham	1	Delaware County	19026	
Addison	1	Somerset County	15411	
Addison Township	1	Somerset County		
Adelaide	1	Fayette County	15425	
Admire	1	York County	17364	
Adrian	1	Armstrong County	16210	
Adrian Furnace	1	Clearfield County		
Adrian Mines	1	Jefferson County		
Advance	1	Adams County		
Advance	1	Indiana County	15732	
Africa	1	Franklin County	17236	
Ahrensville	1	Venango County		
Aiden Lair	1	Montgomery County	19025	
Aiken	1	McKean County	16744	
Ailston	1	York County		
Airville	1	York County	17302	
Airydale	1	Huntingdon County	17060	
Aitch	1	Huntingdon County		
Ajax	1	Venango County		
Akeley	1	Warren County	16345	
Akersville	1	Fulton County	15536	
Akron	1	Lancaster County	17501	
Aladdin	1	Armstrong County	15682	
Alaska	1	Jefferson County	15825	
Alaska	1	Northumberland County		
Alba	1	Bradford County	16910	
Albany	1	Berks County	19529	
Albany	1	Fayette County	15417	
Albany Township	1	Berks County		
Albany Township	1	Bradford County		
Albert	1	Luzerne County		
Alberts Corners	1	Luzerne County	18707	
Albidale	1	Montgomery County	19006	
Albion	1	Erie County	16401	
Albion	1	Jefferson County	15767	
Albrightsville	1	Carbon County	18210	
Alburtis	1	Lehigh County	18011	
Alcoa Center	1	Westmoreland County	15069	
Aldan	1	Delaware County	19018	
Alden	1	Luzerne County	18634	
Aldenville	1	Wayne County	18401	
Alderson	1	Luzerne County	18618	
Aldham	1	Chester County	19460	
Aldovin	1	Wyoming County	18657	
Aleppo Township	1	Allegheny County		
Aleppo Township	1	Greene County	15310	
Alexander Springs	1	Mifflin County	17004	
Alexandria	1	Huntingdon County	16611	
Alfarata	1	Huntingdon County		
Alfarata	1	Mifflin County	17841	
Alford	1	Susquehanna County	18826	
Alice	1	Westmoreland County	15610	
Alicia	1	Fayette County	15417	
Alicia	1	Greene County	15338	
Alinda	1	Perry County	17040	
Aline	1	Snyder County	17853	
Aliquippa	1	Beaver County	15001	
Allandale	1	Cumberland County	17011	
Allegany Township	1	Potter County		
Allegheny	1	Allegheny County	15212	
Allegheny Arsenal	1	Allegheny County	15201	
Allegheny College	1	Crawford County	16335	
Allegheny Furnace	1	Blair County		
Allegheny Portage Railroad National Historic Site	3		16630	
Allegheny Springs	1	Warren County		
Allegheny Township	1	Blair County		
Allegheny Township	1	Butler County		
Allegheny Township	1	Cambria County		
Allegheny Township	1	Somerset County		
Allegheny Township	1	Venango County		
Allegheny Township	1	Westmoreland County		
Alleghenyville	1	Berks County	19540	
Allemans	1	Clearfield County	16639	
Allen	1	Cumberland County	17001	
Allen Crest	1	Lehigh County	18052	
Allen Junction	1	Lehigh County		
Allen Lane	1	Philadelphia County		
Allen Township	1	Northampton County		
Allendale	1	Cambria County		
Allendale	1	Cumberland County	17011	
Allendale Farms	1	Delaware County	19008	
Allenport	1	Huntingdon County	17066	
Allenport	1	Washington County	15412	
Allens	1	Lycoming County		
Allens Crossroads	1	Westmoreland County		
Allens Mills	1	Jefferson County	15851	
Allensville	1	Mifflin County	17002	
Allenton	1	Huntingdon County		
Allentown	1	Lehigh County	18101	99
Allentown-Bethlehem-Easton Airport	1	Lehigh County	18103	
Allenvale	1	Somerset County	15501	
Allenwood	1	Union County	17810	
Alliance Furnace	1	Westmoreland County		
Allis Hollow	1	Bradford County	18837	
Allison	1	Fayette County	15413	
Allison Heights	1	Fayette County	15413	
Allison Park	1	Allegheny County	15101	
Allison Township	1	Clinton County		
Allport	1	Cambria County	15714	
Allport	1	Clearfield County	16821	
Almaden	1	Clearfield County	16680	
Almedia	1	Columbia County	17815	
Almont	1	Bucks County	18960	
Alpha	1	Northampton County	18091	
Alpine	1	York County	17339	
Alsace Manor	1	Berks County	19560	
Alsace Township	1	Berks County		
Alta Manor	1	Blair County	16601	
Altamont	1	Schuylkill County	17931	
Altenwald	1	Franklin County	17268	
Althom	1	Warren County		
Althouse	1	Somerset County		
Altman	1	Lawrence County		
Alton	1	Chester County	19380	
Alton Park	1	Lehigh County		
Altoona	1	Blair County	16601	03
Alum Bank	1	Bedford County	15521	
Alum Rock	1	Clarion County	16373	
Aluta	1	Northampton County	18064	
Alvan	1	Bedford County		
Alverda	1	Indiana County	15710	
Alverton	1	Westmoreland County	15612	
Amaranth	1	Fulton County	17267	
Amasa	1	Lackawanna County	18433	
Ambau	1	York County		
Amberson	1	Franklin County	17210	
Ambler	1	Montgomery County	19002	
Ambler Farms	1	Delaware County	19074	
Ambler Highlands	1	Montgomery County	19034	
Ambridge	1	Beaver County	15003	
Ambridge Heights	1	Beaver County	15003	
Ambrose	1	Indiana County	15759	
Amend	1	Fayette County	15401	
Amesville	1	Clearfield County	16651	
Amity	1	Bucks County		
Amity	1	Washington County	15311	
Amity Gardens	1	Berks County		
Amity Hall	1	Perry County	17020	
Amity Township	1	Berks County		
Amity Township	1	Erie County		
Amityville	1	Berks County		
Amsbry	1	Cambria County	16641	
Amsterdam	1	Mercer County	16127	
Amwell Township	1	Washington County		
Analomink	1	Monroe County	18320	
Anchor	1	Lancaster County		
Ancient Oaks	1	Lehigh County	18062	
Andalusia	1	Bucks County	19020	
Anderson	1	Clearfield County		
Anderson	1	Mifflin County	17029	
Anderson	1	Washington County		
Anderson Creek	1	Clearfield County		
Andersonburg	1	Perry County	17047	
Andersontown	1	York County	17315	
Andersontown	1	York County	17055	
Andover	1	Fulton County	17233	
Andreas	1	Schuylkill County	18211	
Andrews Bridge	1	Lancaster County	17509	
Andrews Plan	1	Beaver County	15001	
Andrews Settlement	1	Potter County	16923	
Angelica	1	Berks County	19540	
Angels	1	Wayne County	18445	
Angora	1	Philadelphia County		
Anise	1	Montgomery County		
Anita	1	Jefferson County	15711	
Ankeny	1	Somerset County		
Annaline Village	1	Delaware County	19061	
Annandale	1	Butler County		
Annin Creek	1	McKean County	16750	
Annin Township	1	McKean County		
Annisville	1	Butler County	16049	
Annville	1	Lebanon County	17003	
Annville Township	1	Lebanon County		
Anselma	1	Chester County	19425	
Ansonia	1	Tioga County	16901	
Ansonville	1	Clearfield County	16656	
Antes Fort	1	Lycoming County	17720	
Anthony Township	1	Lycoming County		
Anthony Township	1	Montour County		
Anthracite	1	Lebanon County	17016	
Antis Township	1	Blair County		
Antram	1	Fayette County		
Antrim	1	Tioga County	16901	
Antrim Township	1	Franklin County		
Apolacon Township	1	Susquehanna County		
Apollo	1	Armstrong County	15613	
Appalachian National Scenic Trail	11		25425	
Appenzell	1	Monroe County	18360	
Applebachsville	1	Bucks County	18951	
Appletree Hill	1	Bucks County		
Applewold	1	Armstrong County	16201	
Apps	1	Northampton County		
Aqua	1	Franklin County	17201	
Aquashicola	1	Carbon County	18012	
Aqueduct	1	Perry County	17020	
Aquetong	1	Bucks County	18938	
Ararat	1	Susquehanna County	18465	
Ararat Township	1	Susquehanna County		
Arbor	1	York County	17356	
Arbuckle	1	Erie County	16438	
Arcadia	1	Indiana County	15712	
Arcadia	1	Lancaster County	17563	
Arch Rock	1	Juniata County	17059	
Arch Spring	1	Blair County	16686	
Archbald	1	Lackawanna County	18403	
Arcola	1	Montgomery County	19420	
Ardara	1	Westmoreland County	15615	
Arden	1	Washington County		
Arden Mines	1	Washington County	15301	
Ardenheim	1	Huntingdon County	16652	
Ardmore	2	Delaware County	19003	
Ardmore	2	Montgomery County	19003	
Ardmore Manor	1	Delaware County	19003	
Ardmore Park	1	Delaware County	19003	
Ardsley	1	Montgomery County	19038	
Arendtsville	1	Adams County	17303	
Arensburg	1	Fayette County	15433	
Argentine	1	Butler County	16040	
Argus	1	Bucks County	18960	
Ariel	1	Wayne County		
Aristes	1	Columbia County	17920	
Arlingham	1	Montgomery County	19031	
Arlingham Hills	1	Montgomery County	19031	
Arlington	1	Delaware County	19082	
Arlington	1	Wayne County	18436	
Arlington Heights	1	Monroe County	18360	
Arlington Knolls	1	Lehigh County	18052	
Armagh	1	Indiana County	15920	
Armagh Township	1	Mifflin County		
Armbrust	1	Westmoreland County	15616	
Armenia Township	1	Bradford County		
Armstrong	1	Butler County		
Armstrong Township	1	Indiana County		
Armstrong Township	1	Lycoming County		
Arndts	1	Northampton County	18038	
Arnold	1	Westmoreland County	15068	
Arnold City	1	Fayette County	15012	
Arnot	1	Tioga County	16911	
Arnots Addition	1	Schuylkill County	17970	
Arona	1	Westmoreland County	15617	
Aronimink	1	Delaware County	19026	
Aronimink Estates	1	Delaware County	19026	
Aronimink Heights	1	Delaware County	19026	
Aronimink Park	1	Delaware County	19026	
Aronwold	1	Delaware County	19073	
Arrowhead Lake	1	Monroe County	18347	
Arroyo	1	Elk County		
Artemas	1	Bedford County	17211	
Arthurs	1	Clarion County	16254	
Arundel Village	1	Montgomery County	19044	
Asaph	1	Tioga County	16901	
Asbury	1	Columbia County	17859	
Asbury	1	Erie County	16509	
Ashcom	1	Bedford County		
Asherton	1	Northumberland County		
Ashfield	1	Carbon County	18212	
Ashland	1	Clearfield County	16666	
Ashland	2	Columbia County	17921	
Ashland	2	Schuylkill County	17921	
Ashland	2	Columbia County	17921	
Ashland Township	1	Clarion County		
Ashley	1	Luzerne County	18706	
Ashmead Village	1	Montgomery County		
Ashmore	1	Luzerne County		
Ashtola	1	Somerset County	15963	
Ashtree	1	Greene County		
Ashville	1	Cambria County	16613	
Askam	1	Luzerne County	18706	
Aspers	1	Adams County	17304	
Aspinwall	1	Allegheny County	15215	
Aston	1	Delaware County	19014	
Aston Manor	1	Delaware County	19013	
Aston Mills	1	Delaware County		
Aston Township	1	Delaware County		
Astral	1	Venango County		
Asylum Township	1	Bradford County		
Atchison	1	Fayette County		
Atco	1	Wayne County	12764	
Atglen	1	Chester County	19310	
Athens	1	Bradford County	18810	
Athens Township	1	Bradford County		
Athens Township	1	Crawford County		
Athol	1	Berks County	19519	
Atkinson Mills	1	Mifflin County	17051	
Atlantic	1	Clearfield County	16651	
Atlantic	1	Crawford County	16111	
Atlantic	1	Somerset County		
Atlantic	1	Westmoreland County	15671	
Atlas	1	Northumberland County	17851	
Atlasburg	1	Washington County	15004	
Atwells Crossing	1	Butler County		
Atwood	1	Armstrong County	16249	
Auburn	1	Schuylkill County	17922	
Auburn	1	Susquehanna County		
Auburn Center	1	Susquehanna County	18623	
Auburn Four Corners	1	Susquehanna County	18844	
Auburn Township	1	Susquehanna County		
Aucheys	1	Schuylkill County		
Auchincloss	1	Luzerne County		
Audenried	1	Carbon County	18201	
Audubon	1	Montgomery County	19407	
Aughwick	1	Huntingdon County	17066	
Augustaville	1	Northumberland County	17801	
Aultman	1	Indiana County	15713	
Austin	1	Potter County	16720	
Austin Heights	1	Lackawanna County	18518	
Austinburg	1	Tioga County	16928	
Austinville	1	Bradford County	16914	
Autumn Leaves	1	Wayne County		
Avalon	1	Allegheny County	15202	
Avella	1	Washington County	15312	
Avery	1	Wyoming County		
Avis	1	Clinton County	17721	
Avoca	1	Luzerne County	18641	
Avon	1	Lebanon County	17042	
Avon Heights	1	Lebanon County	17042	
Avondale	1	Chester County	19311	
Avondale	1	Luzerne County		
Avondale Hill	1	Luzerne County		
Avondale Knolls	1	Delaware County	19086	
Avonia	1	Erie County		
Avonmore	1	Westmoreland County	15618	
Avoy	1	Wayne County		
Axemann	1	Centre County	16823	
Ayers Crossroads	1	Bradford County		
Ayers Hill	1	Potter County		
Ayr Township	1	Fulton County		
Azelta	1	Tioga County		

== See also ==
- List of cities in Pennsylvania
- List of counties in Pennsylvania
