= Accomac =

Accomac may refer to:

== Geography ==
- Accomac, Virginia, a town in Virginia
  - Accomac Shire, a former county in Virginia of which the town was the county seat
- Accomac, Pennsylvania

== Peoples ==
- Accomac people, a historic Native American tribe from the Eastern Shore of Virginia

== Ships ==
- USS Accomac, three ships of the US Navy

== See also ==
- Accomack County, Virginia, the current incarnation of Accomac Shire
- Plymouth, Massachusetts was built on a site identified on early maps as Accomack
