= West Fallowfield =

West Fallowfield is the name of two townships in Pennsylvania:

- West Fallowfield Township, Chester County, Pennsylvania
- West Fallowfield Township, Crawford County, Pennsylvania
