= Aldham =

Aldham may refer to:

- Aldham, Essex, England, United Kingdom
- Aldham, Suffolk, England, United Kingdom
- Aldham, Pennsylvania, a town in Pennsylvania, United States
- Aldham, Yorkshire, on the Dearne and Dove Canal, England
- Mary Ann Aldham (1858–1940), English suffragette
- Thomas Aldham (died 1660), English Quaker

== See also ==
- Aldham Robarts LRC, a library belonging to Liverpool John Moores University in Liverpool, England
