= Shenandoah Heights, Pennsylvania =

Unincorporated community in Pennsylvania, US

Shenandoah Heights
- Census-designated place
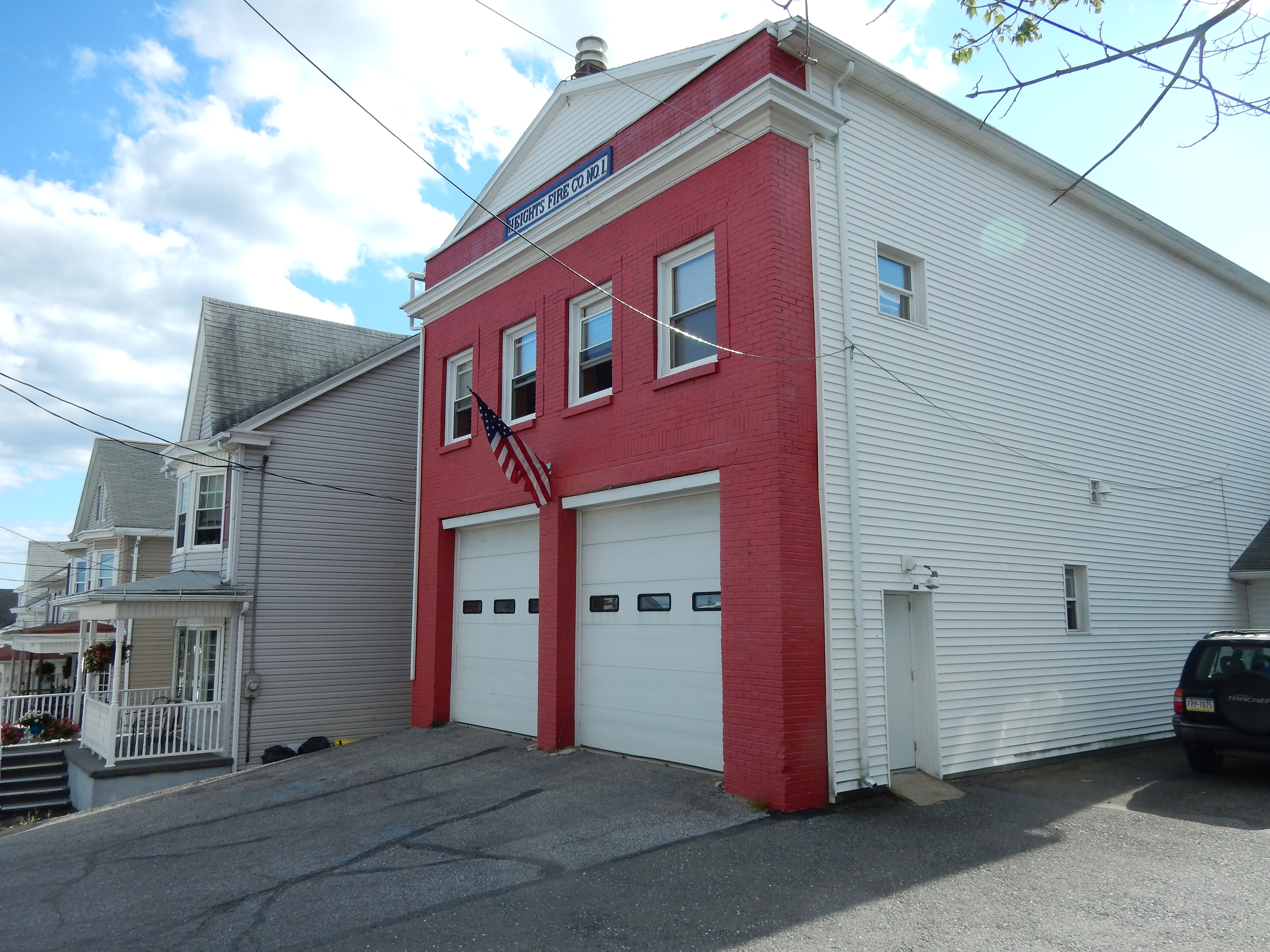
- Heights Fire Co. No. 1

- Location within the U.S. state of Pennsylvania Shenandoah Heights (the United States)
- Coordinates: 40°49′47″N 76°12′21″W
- Country: United States
- State: Pennsylvania
- County: Schuylkill

Area
  - Total: 0.85 sq mi (2.2 km^{2})
  - Land: 0.81 sq mi (2.1 km^{2})
  - Water: 0.039 sq mi (0.1 km^{2})

Population (2020)
  - Total: 1,222
  - Density: 1,500/sq mi (580/km^{2})
- Time zone: UTC-5 (Eastern (EST))
  - Summer (DST): UTC-4 (EDT)
- Area code: 570

Shenandoah Heights is a census-designated place (CDP) in West Mahanoy Township, Pennsylvania. The population was 1,222 at the 2020 census.

== Geography ==
Shenandoah Heights is located at 40°49′47″N 76°12′21″W (40.829688, -76.205718). According to the U.S. Census Bureau, Shenandoah Heights has a total area of 0.8 square miles (2.1 km^{2}), of which 0.8 square miles (2.1 km^{2}) is land and 0.04 square miles (0.10 km^{2}) (2.38%) is water.

== Demographics ==
At the 2000 census there were 1,298 people, 549 households, and 376 families living in the CDP. The population density was 1,588.6 inhabitants per square mile (613.4/km^{2}). There were 613 housing units at an average density of 750.2 per square mile (289.7/km^{2}). The racial makeup of the CDP was 99.31% White, 0.08% Native American, 0.08% Asian, 0.39% from other races, and 0.15% from two or more races. Hispanic or Latino of any race were 0.69%.

Of the 549 households 25.1% had children under the age of 18 living with them, 53.6% were married couples living together, 10.6% had a female householder with no husband present, and 31.5% were non-families. 28.4% of households were one person and 17.5% were one person aged 65 or older. The average household size was 2.35 and the average family size was 2.88.

The age distribution was 19.2% under the age of 18, 7.3% from 18 to 24, 28.2% from 25 to 44, 24.1% from 45 to 64, and 21.2% 65 or older. The median age was 43 years. For every 100 females, there were 90.9 males. For every 100 females age 18 and over, there were 91.4 males.

The median household income was $38,958 and the median family income was $43,875. Males had a median income of $31,793 versus $21,250 for females. The per capita income for the CDP was $23,898. About 1.2% of families and 1.9% of the population were below the poverty line, including 4.7% of those under the age of 18 and none of those 65 and older.

== Education ==
The school district is Shenandoah Valley School District.

== Media ==
WMBT AM-1530 with studios and transmitter in Shenandoah Heights, served the community from 1963 to 2003.

== Gallery ==
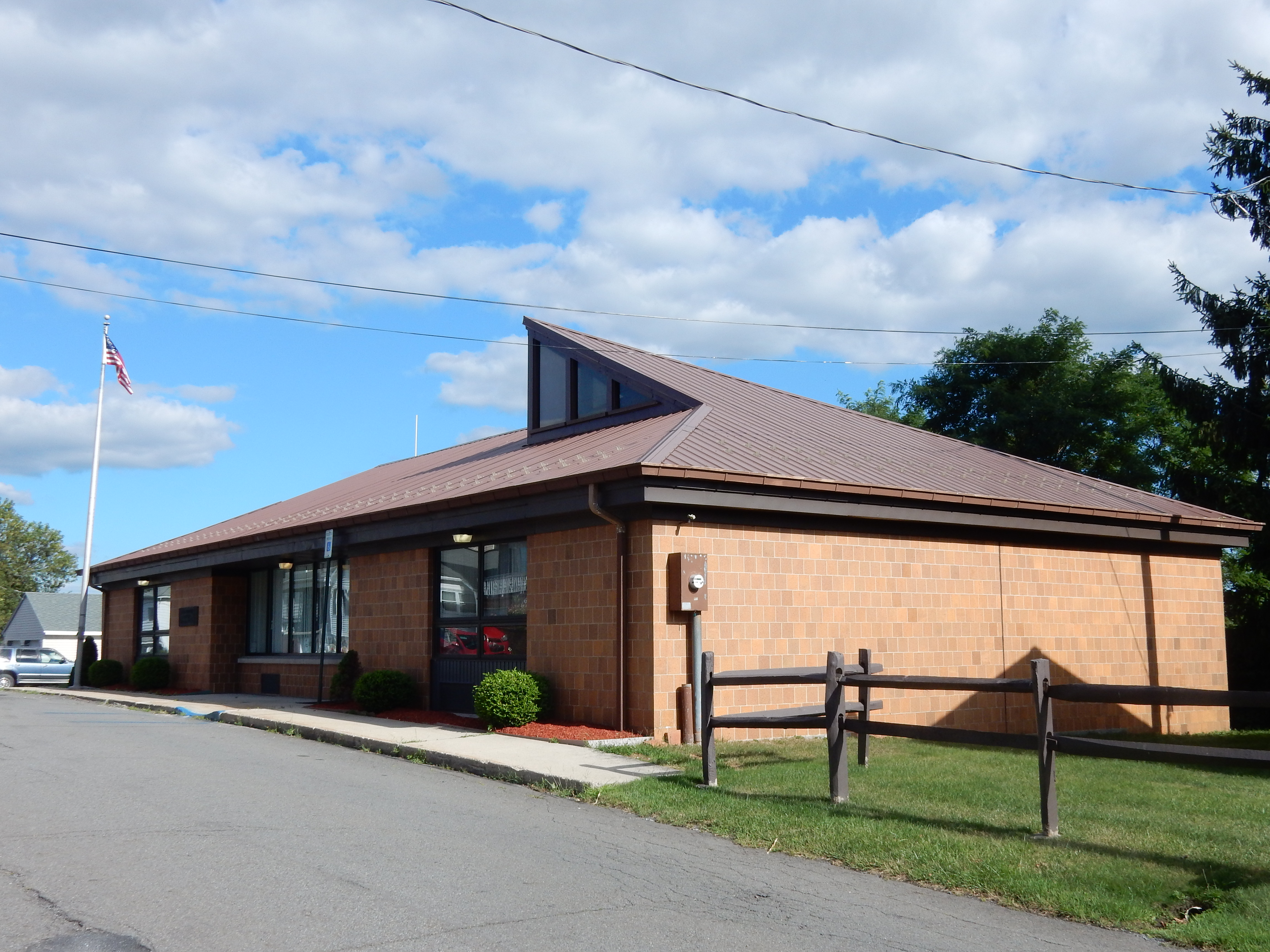
West Mahanoy Township Hall.

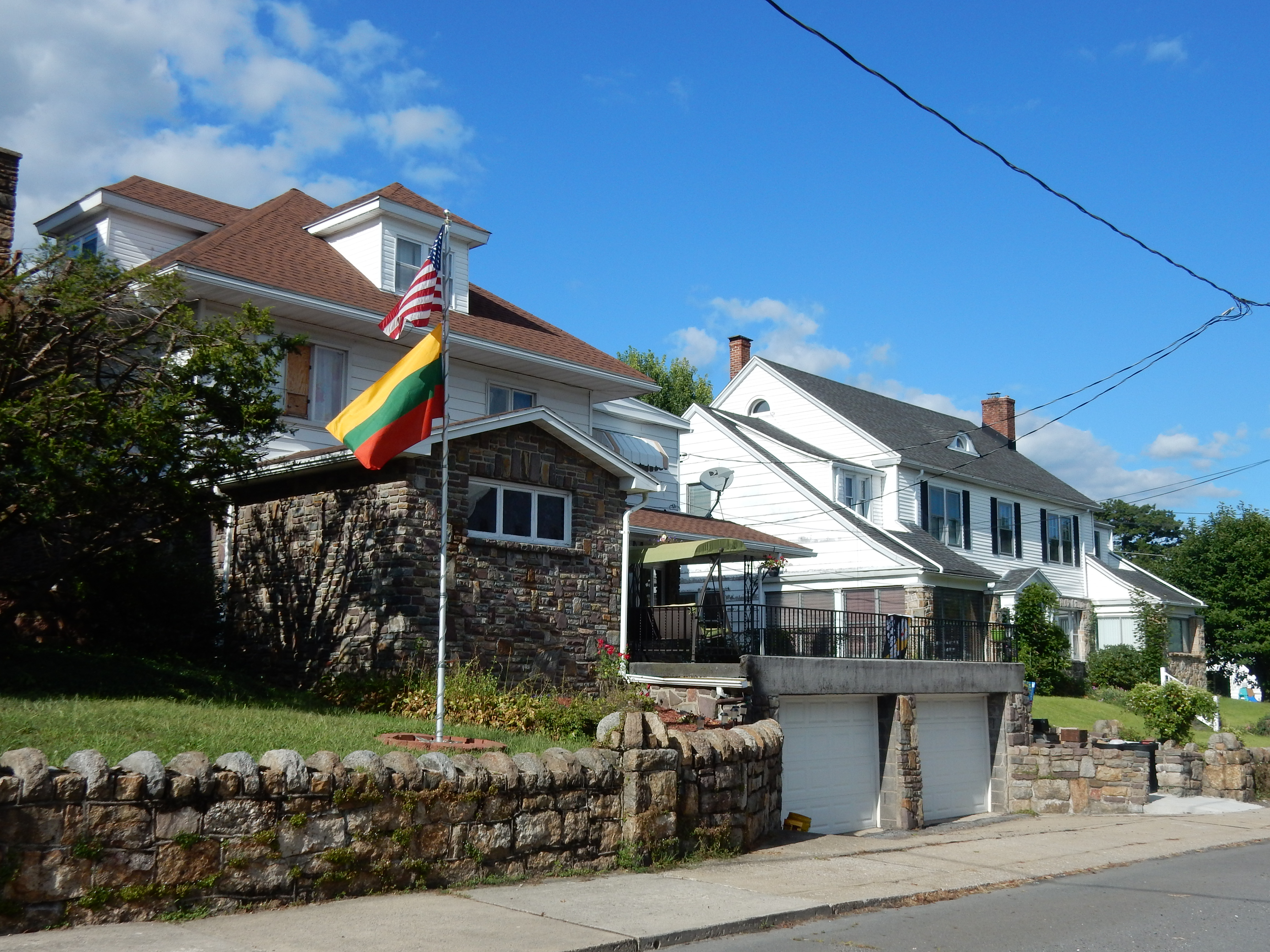
Indiana Avenue.

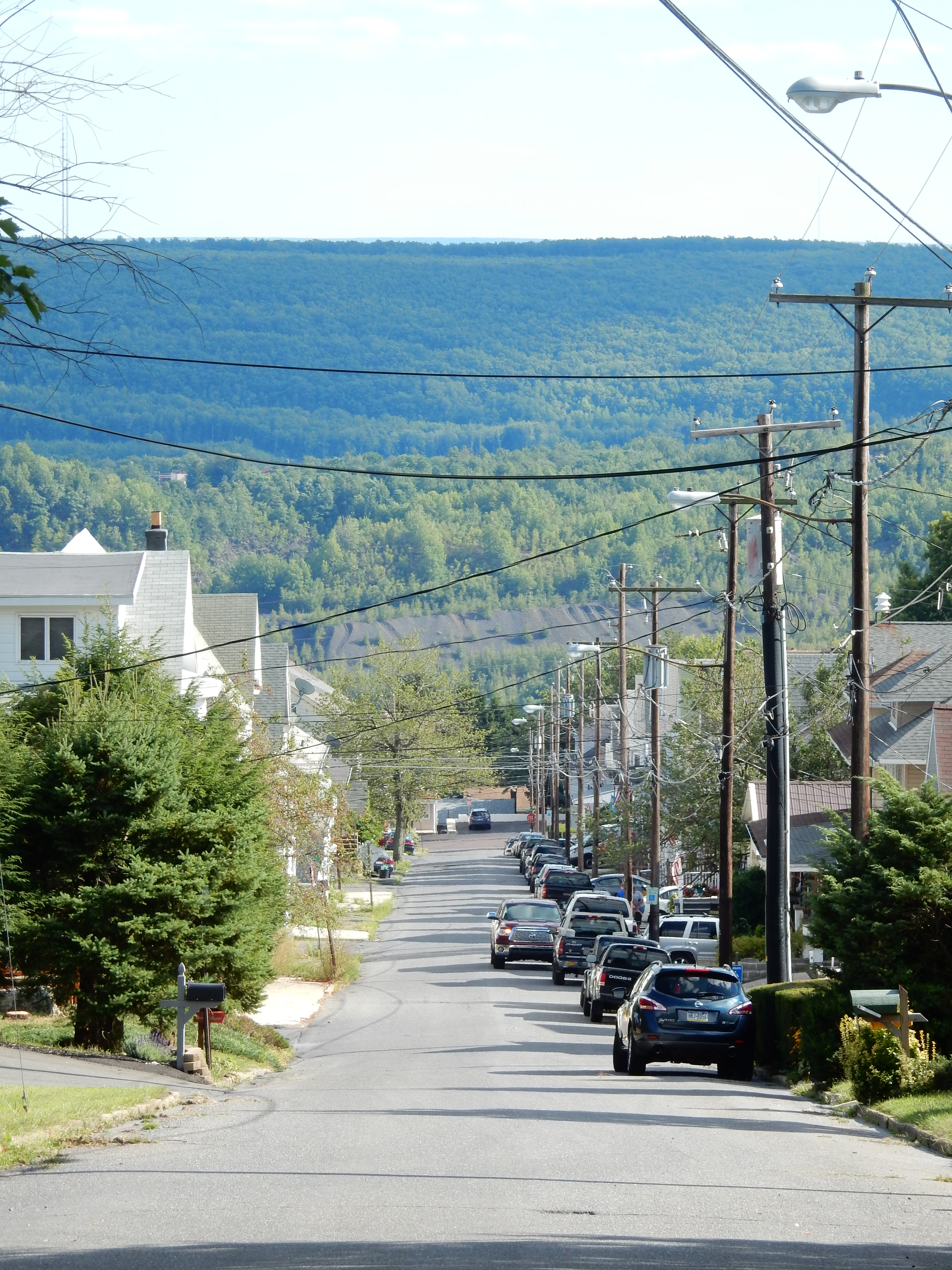
Swatara Road.

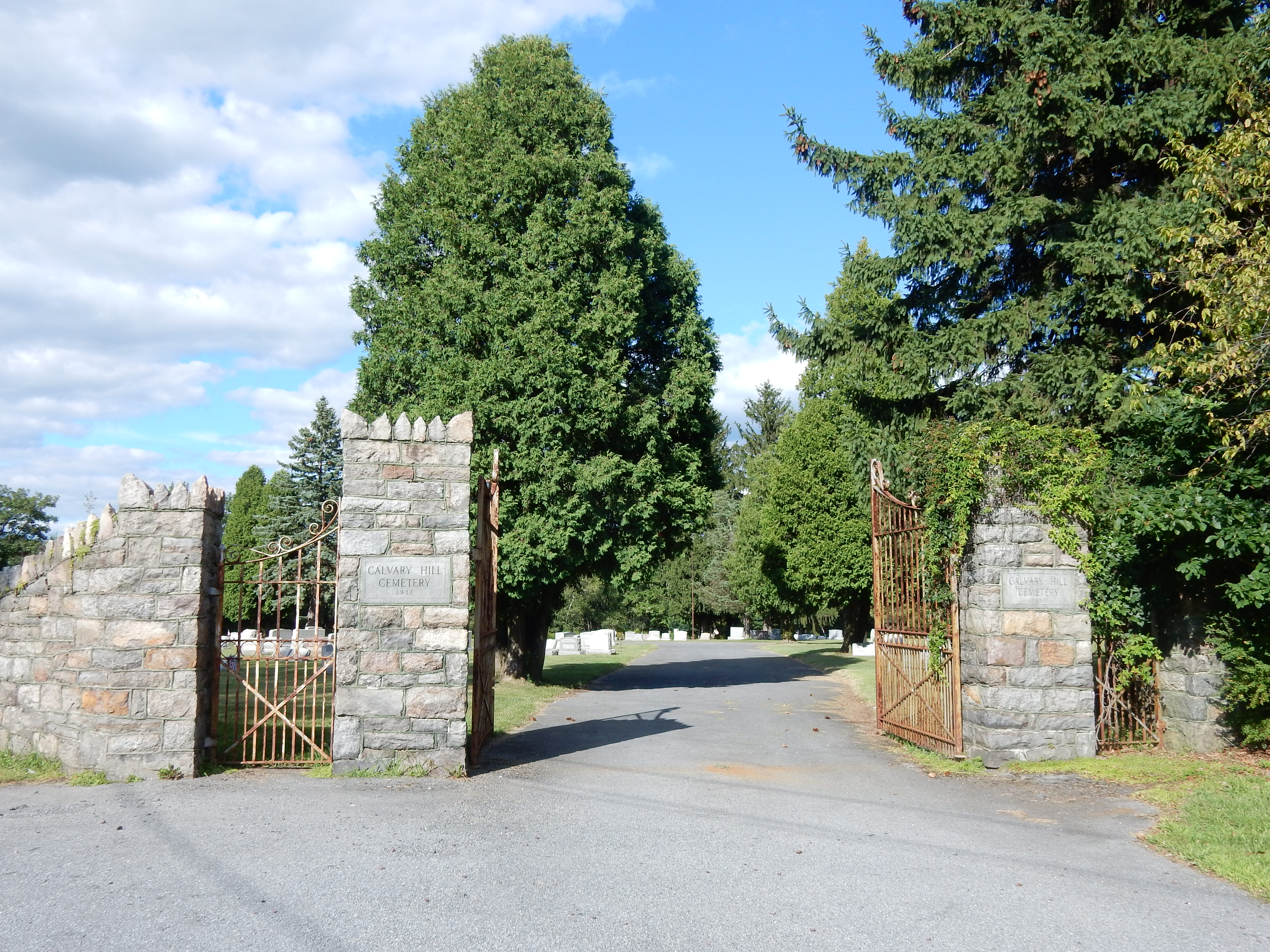
Calvary Hill Cemetery.

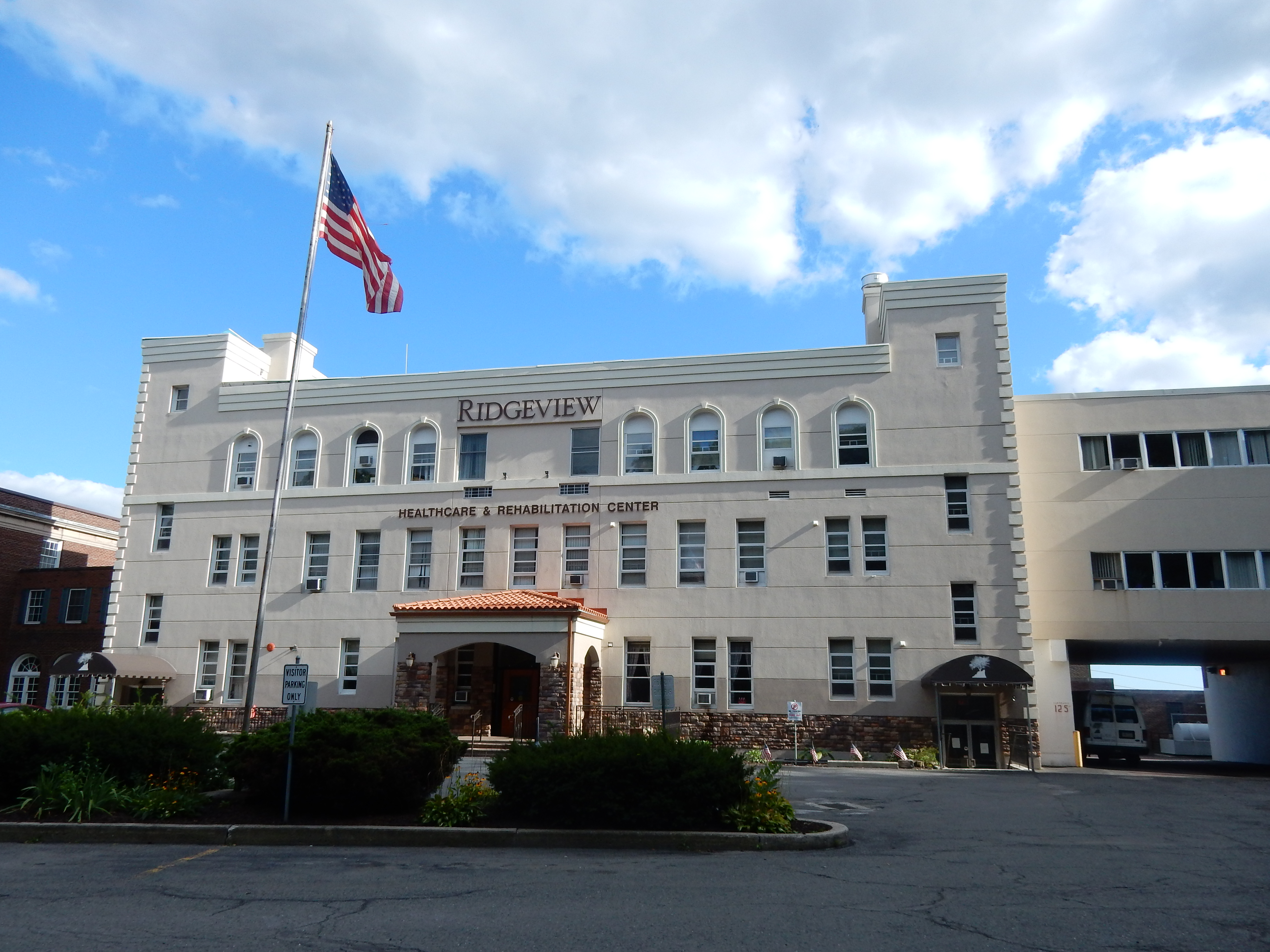
Ridgeview Health Center.
