= Krejčír =

Krejčír is a Czech-language occupational surname, literally meaning 'tailor'. Notable people with the surname include:

- Radovan Krejčíř (born 1968), Czech convicted criminal
- Timothy Wayne Krajcir (born Timothy Wayne McBride; November 28, 1944) American serial killer
