= Dr. James White House =

Historic house in Pennsylvania, United States

- Formerly listed on the U.S. National Register of Historic Places
- Location: Jct. of U.S. 322 and PA 285, Hartstown, West Fallowfield Township, Pennsylvania
- Area: 0.3 acres (0.12 ha)
- Built: 1835
- Architectural style: Greek Revival, Other, Vernacular Greek Revival
- NRHP reference No.: 80003478

Significant dates
- Added to NRHP: 1980
- Removed from NRHP: July 21, 2004

The Dr. James White House was a historic home located at Hartstown, West Fallowfield Township, Crawford County, Pennsylvania. The main section was built in 1835, and was a two-story, frame dwelling in a vernacular Greek Revival style. A one-story addition with porch was added at a later date. It was dismantled in the early 1980s.

It was added to the National Register of Historic Places in 1980 and delisted in 2004.
