= Applebachsville, Pennsylvania =

Unincorporated community in Pennsylvania, US

Applebachsville Snitzbachsville
- Populated place
- Applebachsville, Haycock Township Applebachsville (the United States)
- Coordinates: 40°28′57″N 75°16′23″W
- Country: United States
- State: Pennsylvania
- County: Bucks
- Elevation: 545 ft (166 m)
- Time zone: UTC-5 (EST)
  - Summer (DST): UTC-4 (EDT)
- ZIP code: 18951
- Area codes: 215, 267, and 445

Applebachsville is a populated place in Haycock Township, Bucks County, Pennsylvania, United States, located 2.6 miles (4.2 km) northeast of Richlandtown.

== History ==
The area was known as the Stokes Tract as early as 1735, until 1837, when it was sold by William and Eleanor Stokes to a sea captain, George Dutch. His son George F. Dutch sold the property to General Paul Applebach and his brother Henry in 1847, who were in the cattle and horse business. The Applebach family name was originally 'Afflerbach' from Wittgenstein, in Westphalia, Germany. The first of the family to immigrate here was Johan Henrich Afflerbach, who arrived in Philadelphia aboard the Sally from Rotterdam on 29 October 1770. The Applebachs founded Applebachsville, laying out building lots on Bethlehem Road in 1848. Within a few years, it was visited daily by stagecoaches en route between Philadelphia and Bethlehem, giving the village the nickname 'Metropolis of Haycock'. The Pennsylvania Germans dubbed it 'Snitzbachsville'. A post office was established in 1874, but mail now is delivered by the Quakertown post office. The German Evangelical Lutheran and Reformed and Mennonite (Lutheran, Reformed, Mennonite) church was built in 1855.

== Geography and statistics ==
Applebachsville's elevation is listed as 545 feet (166 m). It is located adjacent to Lake Towhee Park, which is formed by a dam along Kimples Creek (Dimple Creek), and is located about a mile west of Haycock Mountain, the highest elevation in Bucks County. Pennsylvania State Game Lands Number 157 is located on and around Haycock Mountain.

Applebachsville students are educated at the Quakertown Community School District.

The village is served by the Pennsylvania State Police (Dublin Barricks), Haycock Fire Company No. 1 (Station 63), Upper Bucks Regional Emergency Medical Services (Station 141).

Applebachsville is included in the 18951 ZIP Code (Quakertown, Pennsylvania).
