= Dimple Creek =

Dimple Creek Kimples Creek
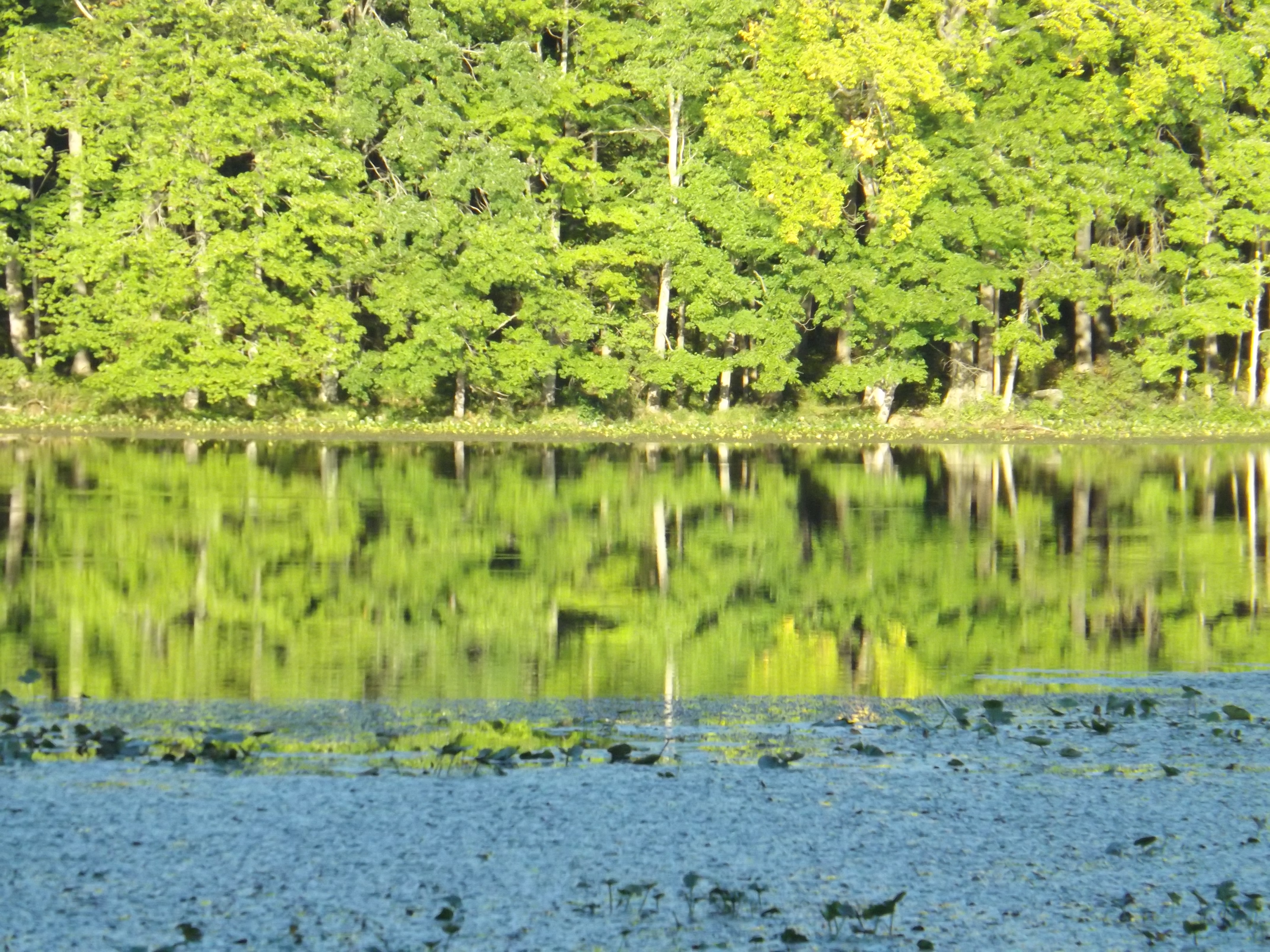
- Light reflecting off Lake Towhee

- Dimple Creek

Location
- Country: United States
- State: Pennsylvania
- County: Bucks
- Township: Haycock

Physical characteristics
- Source
  - coordinates: 40°30′40″N 75°15′22″W
  - elevation: 520 feet (160 m)
- Mouth
  - coordinates: 40°27′19″N 75°16′36″W
  - elevation: 456 feet (139 m)
- Length: 3.89 miles (6.26 km)
- Basin size: 7.33 square miles (19.0 km^{2})

Basin features
- Progression: Dimple Creek → Tohickon Creek → Delaware River → Delaware Bay
- River system: Delaware River
- Landmarks: Haycock Mountain
- Waterbodies: Lake Towhee
- Bridges: Stoney Garden Road; East Sawmill Road; Deerwood Lane; Roudenbush Road; East Thatcher Road

Dimple Creek (Kimples Creek) is a tributary of the Tohickon Creek in Haycock Township, Bucks County, Pennsylvania in the United States. It is part of the Delaware River watershed.

== Statistics ==
Dimple Creek's GNIS identification number is 1173286, its Pennsylvania Department of Conservation and Natural Resources identification number is 03174. It has a watershed of 7.33 square miles (19.0 km^{2}), and meets it confluence at Tohickon Creek's 19.90 river mile. Dimple Creek flows through Lake Towhee.

== Course ==
Dimple Creek rises at an elevation of 520 feet (160 m) in the northern part of Haycock Township from an unnamed pond west northwest of Little Haycock Mountain. Flowing south, it receives a tributary from the left bank, then flows into Lake Towhee a lake formed by a dam in the creek. From there it flows to the southwest to its confluence with the Tohickon at the Levi Sheard Mill at an elevation of 456 feet (139 m). The stream is 3.89 miles (6.26 km), which results in an average slope of 16.45 feet per mile (3.35 meters per kilometer).

== Geology ==
- Appalachian Highlands Division
  - Piedmont Province
    - Gettysburg-Newark Lowland Section
      - Diabase

Dimple Creek lies in an intrusion of magma into the local Brunswick Formation in the Newark Lowland section or rock, part of the Piedmont Province of the Appalchian Highlands Division. About 200 million years ago, about the time of the Jurassic and the Triassic, the magma intruded and cooled to form diabase consisting of labradorite and augite, very highly resistant to erosion.

== Crossings and Bridges ==
Crossing	NBI Number	Length	Lanes	Spans	Material/Design	Built	Reconstructed	Latitude	Longitude
Stoney Garden Road	-	-	-	-	-	-	-	-	-
East Sawmill Road	7464	7 metres (23 ft)	1	1	Steel stringer/multi-beam or girder	1937	-	40°29'18.5"N	75°15'21.2"W
Deerwood Lane	7449	7 metres (23 ft)	1	1	Steel Stringer/Multi-beam or girder	1971	-	40°29'7.4"N	75°15'36.23"W
Roudenbush Road	7579	9 metres (30 ft)	1	1	Steel stringer/nulti-beam or girder	1930	-	40°28'15.1"N	75°16'3.2"W
East Thatcher Road	7414	17 metres (56 ft)	2	1	Prestressed concrete box beam or girders - single or spread	1972	-	40°27'32.3"N	75°16'33.2"W

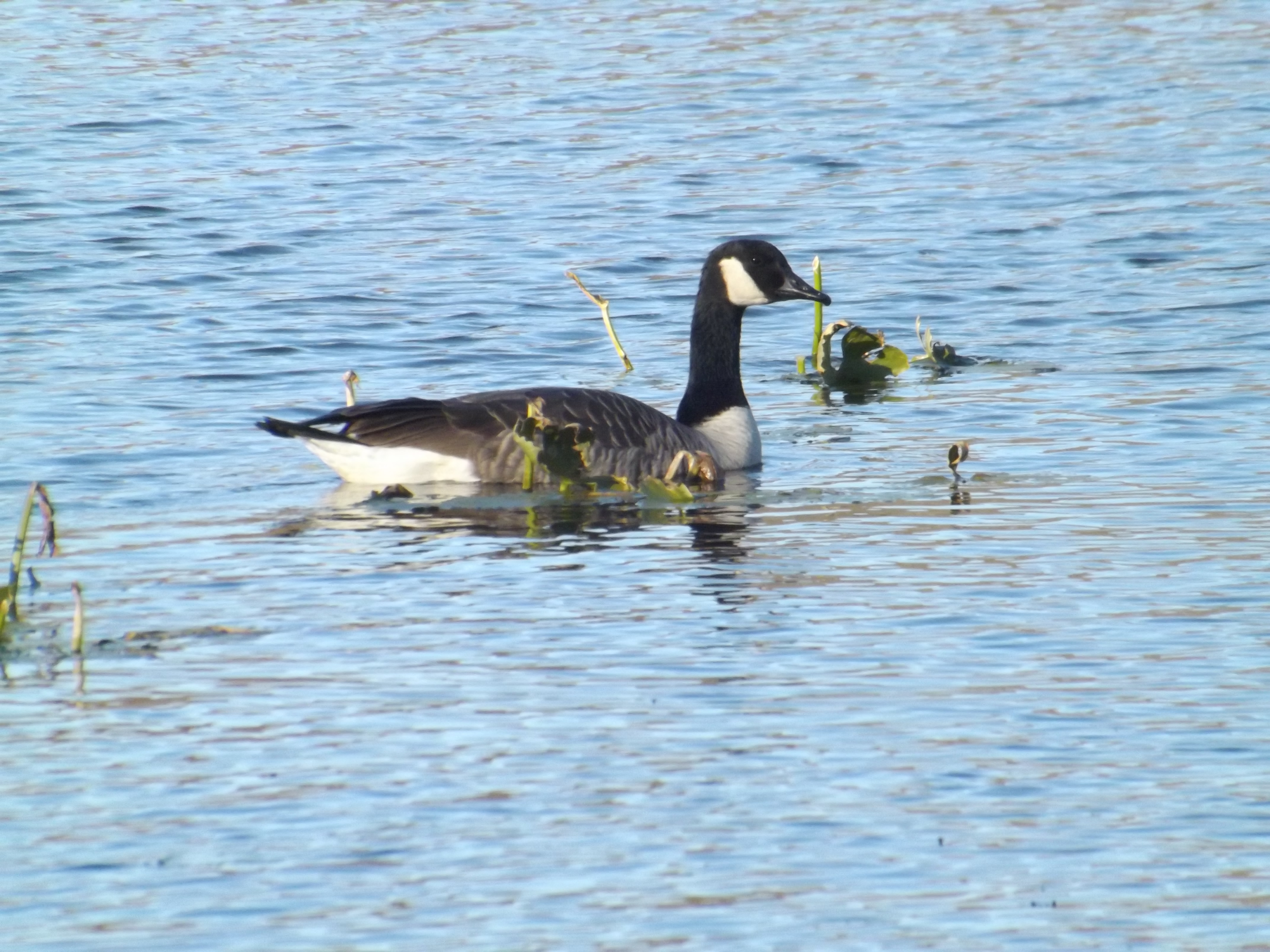
Goose paddling in Lake Towhee in the Autumn of 2016.
