= USS Accomac =

USS Accomac may refer to the following ships operated by the United States Navy:

- USS Accomac (YTL-18), was the second name of a small harbor tugboat commissioned 2 April 1898 as Algonquin.
- USS Accomac (APB-49), was an LST-542-class tank landing ship that was later converted to a self-propelled barracks ship.
- Accomac (YTB-812), a Natick-class large harbor tug in service from 1971 until 2012.
