= West Mahanoy Township, Pennsylvania =

Township in Pennsylvania, US

Coordinates: 40°48′00″N 76°15′00″W

- Township
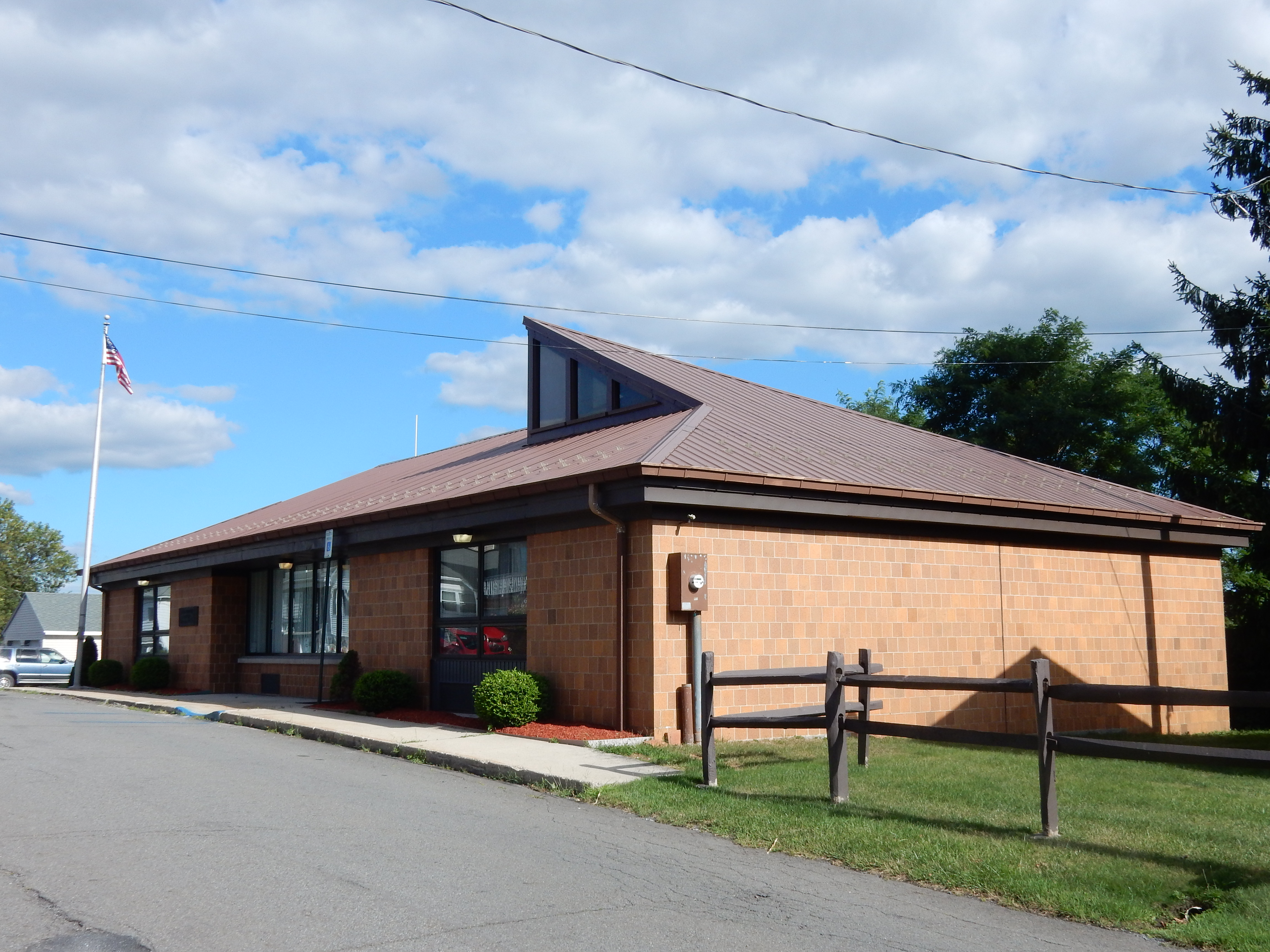
- Township municipal building

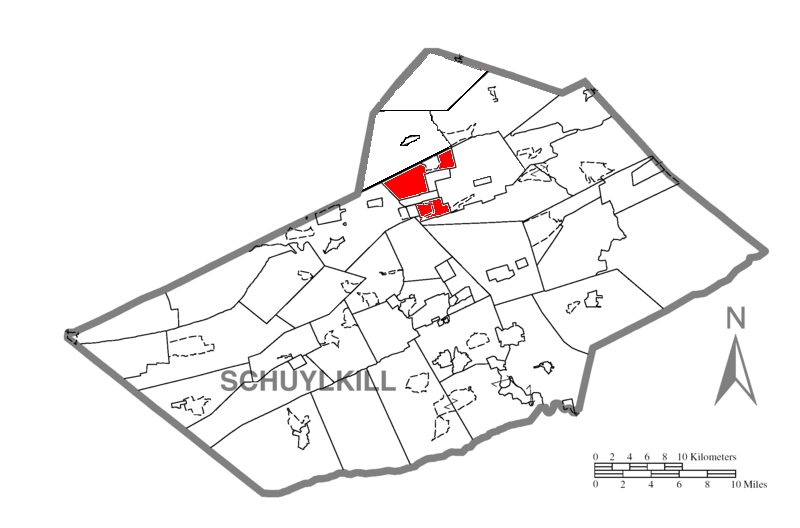
- Map of Schuylkill County, Pennsylvania Highlighting West Mahanoy Township

- Map of Schuylkill County, Pennsylvania
- Country: United States
- State: Pennsylvania
- County: Schuylkill
- Incorporated: 1874

Area
  - Total: 10.42 sq mi (27.00 km^{2})
  - Land: 10.35 sq mi (26.80 km^{2})
  - Water: 0.077 sq mi (0.20 km^{2})

Population (2020)
  - Total: 2,786 ▼
  - Estimate (2021): 2,785
  - Density: 267.3/sq mi (103.21/km^{2})
- Time zone: UTC-5 (Eastern (EST))
  - Summer (DST): UTC-4 (EDT)
- FIPS code: 42-107-83408
- Website: West Mahanoy

West Mahanoy Township is a township that is located in Schuylkill County, Pennsylvania. It is separated into two sections by Gilberton borough. The population was 2,786 at the time of the 2020 census.

== Geography ==
According to the U.S. Census Bureau, the township has a total area of 10.5 square miles (27.1 km^{2}), of which 10.4 square miles (26.9 km^{2}) is land and 0.1 square mile (0.2 km^{2}) (0.67%) is water. It contains the census-designated places of Altamont and Shenandoah Heights.

== Demographics ==
Historical population
Census	Pop.	Note	%±
2010	2,872		—
2020	2,786		−3.0%
2021 (est.)	2,785		0.0%
U.S. Decennial Census

At the time of the 2000 census there were 6,166 people, 1,307 households, and 880 families living in the township.

The population density was 592.7 inhabitants per square mile (228.8/km^{2}). There were 1,503 housing units at an average density of 144.5 per square mile (55.8/km^{2}).

The racial makeup of the township was 69.48% White, 27.00% African American, 0.08% Native American, 0.41% Asian, 2.85% from other races, and 0.18% from two or more races. Hispanic or Latino of any race were 5.14%.

Of the 1,307 households that were documented, 23.9% had children who were under the age of eighteen living with them, 50.6% were married couples living together, 11.2% had a female householder with no husband present, and 32.6% were non-families. Out of the households that were documented, 29.5% were one-person households and 17.3% had one person living alone who was aged sixty-five or older.

The average household size was 2.36 and the average family size was 2.92.

The age distribution was 9.8% of residents who were under the age of 18, 13.6% from 18 to 24, 46.0% from 25 to 44, 18.4% from 45 to 64, and 12.2% 65 or older. The median age was 36 years.

For every one hundred females, there were 275.1 males. For every one hundred females who were aged eighteen or older, there were 314.2 males.

The median household income was $32,979 and the median family income was $39,114. Males had a median income of $17,102 compared with that of $19,511 for females.

The per capita income for the township was $15,212.

Approximately 3.3% of families and 5.2% of the population were living below the poverty line, including 6.4% of those who were under the age of eighteen and 5.3% of those who were aged sixty-five or older.

=== Media ===
Locally owned WMBT-AM 1530, with studios and transmitter in Shenandoah Heights, Pennsylvania, served the community from 1963 to 2003.

== Notable person ==
- Timothy Krajcir, serial killer

== Education ==
It is in the Shenandoah Valley School District.
