= Haycock Creek (Tohickon Creek tributary) =

- Haycock Creek

Location
- Country: United States
- State: Pennsylvania
- County: Bucks
- Township: Springfield, Haycock, Nockamixon

Physical characteristics
- Source
  - coordinates: 40°31′34″N 75°15′39″W
  - elevation: 590 feet (180 m)
- Mouth
  - coordinates: 40°30′0″N 75°12′14″W
  - elevation: 394 feet (120 m)
- Length: 3.18 miles (5.12 km)
- Basin size: 9.88 square miles (25.6 km^{2})

Basin features
- Progression: Haycock Creek → Lake Nockamixon → Tohickon Creek → Delaware River → Delaware Bay
- River system: Delaware River
- Landmarks: Haycock Mountain
- Waterbodies: Lake Nockamixon
- Bridges: Winding Road; School Road; Stony Garden Road; Haycock Run Road; Church Road; Pennsylvania Route 563 (Mountain View Drive)

Haycock Creek is a tributary of the Tohickon Creek in Bucks County, Pennsylvania, United States, and is part of the Delaware River watershed.

== History ==
The area surrounding Haycock Creek was first inhabited by the Lenape people. After the arrival of Europeans, the first to purchase land in the area was John Anderson. The first settler was Edward McCarty who purchased land from Thomas and John Penn. Descendants of McCarty occupied mostly the Nockamixon Township side of Haycock Creek. The Frankenfield family were early landowners on the Haycock Township side. As early as 1742 Jesuit fathers from Goshenhoppen began to hold services at McCarty's house and continued until 1798 when the Saint John the Baptist parish was established, the first Catholic Church was built for $150 on land donated by Edward McCarty's nephew John. The current building was constructed in 1854.

== Statistics ==
Haycock Creek's GNIS (United States Geological Survey) identification number is 1209301, its Pennsylvania Department of Conservation and Natural Resources identification number is 03154. The stream is about 5 miles (8.0 km) long, has a watershed of 9.88 square miles (25.6 km^{2}), and meets its confluence in Lake Nockamixon at the Tohickon Creek's 11.20 river mile.

== Course ==
Haycock Creek rises at an elevation of 590 feet (180 m) in Springfield Township northeast of the intersection of Winding Road and Mink Road and flows to the southeast. It then becomes the border of Haycock and Nockamixon Townships until it meets the lake at an elevation of 394 feet (120 m). Its confluence with the Tohickon in the lake is the four corners of Bedminster, Haycock, Nockamixon, and Tinicum Townships. It has four tributaries, two from the right and two from the left banks. With a length of 3.18 miles (5.12 km), Haycock Creek has an average slope of 61.64 feet per mile (11.72 meters per kilometer).

== Geology ==
- Appalachian Highlands Division
  - Piedmont Province
    - Gettysburg-Newark Lowland Section
      - Brunswick Formation
      - Diabase

The Brunswick Formation is a sedimentary layer of rock consisting of mudstone, siltstone, and beds of green, brown, and red-brown shale. Mineralogy consists of argillite and hornfels. About 200 million years ago, magma intruded into the Brunswick and cooled quickly forming a fine grained diabase consisting of primarily labradorite and augite. Haycock Mountain (on the right bank of the creek) and several other features in the area are remnants of the intrusion after the Brunswick has eroded away over time. The first one-third or so if Haycock Creek's course is located in a region of diabase rock which intruded into the local sedimentary layers of the Brunswick Formation during the Jurassic and the Triassic, then the remaining course flows over the Brunswick Formation.

== Crossings and Bridges ==
Crossing	NBI Number	Length	Lanes	Spans	Material/Design	Built	Reconstructed	Latitude	Longitude
Pennsylvania Route 563 (Mountain View Drive)	7058	49 metres (161 ft)	2	3	Prestressed concrete Box beam or girders - single or spread	1972		40°29'28.4"N	75°11'31.8"W
Church Road	7580	14 metres (46 ft)	2	1	Concrete Tee Beam	1928		40°30'5.1"N	75°12'19.4"W
Haycock Run Road	7557	10 metres (33 ft)	1	1	Steel stringer/multi-beam or girder	1930	1988	40°30'49.7"N	75°13'15.2"W
Stony Garden Road	7451	11 metres (36 ft)	2	2	Masonry Arch-Deck			40°31'3"N	75°13'59"W
School Road									
Winding Road									
