= Adamsville, Pennsylvania =

Unincorporated community in Pennsylvania, US

- Census-designated place
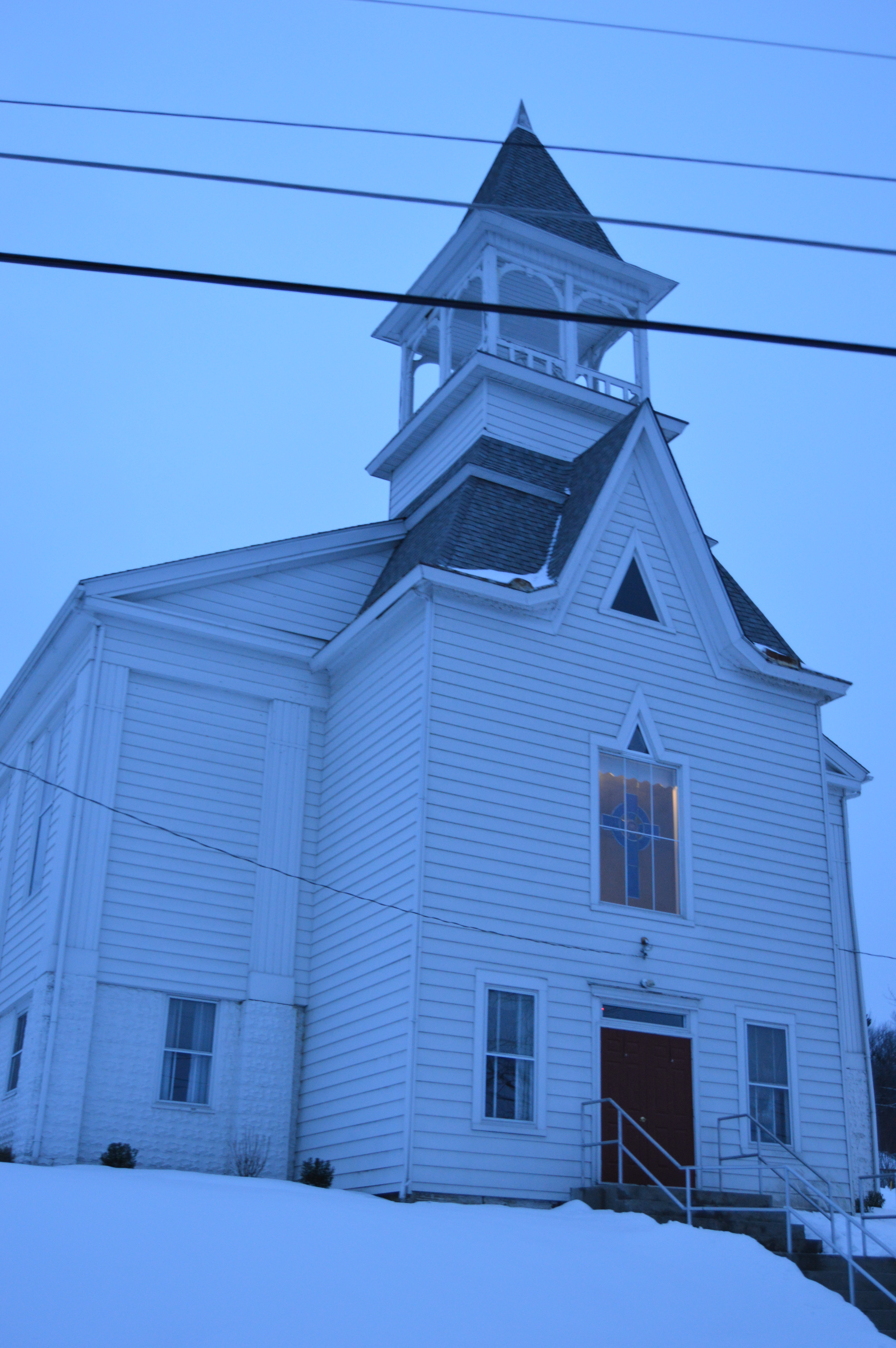
- Adamsville Presbyterian Church

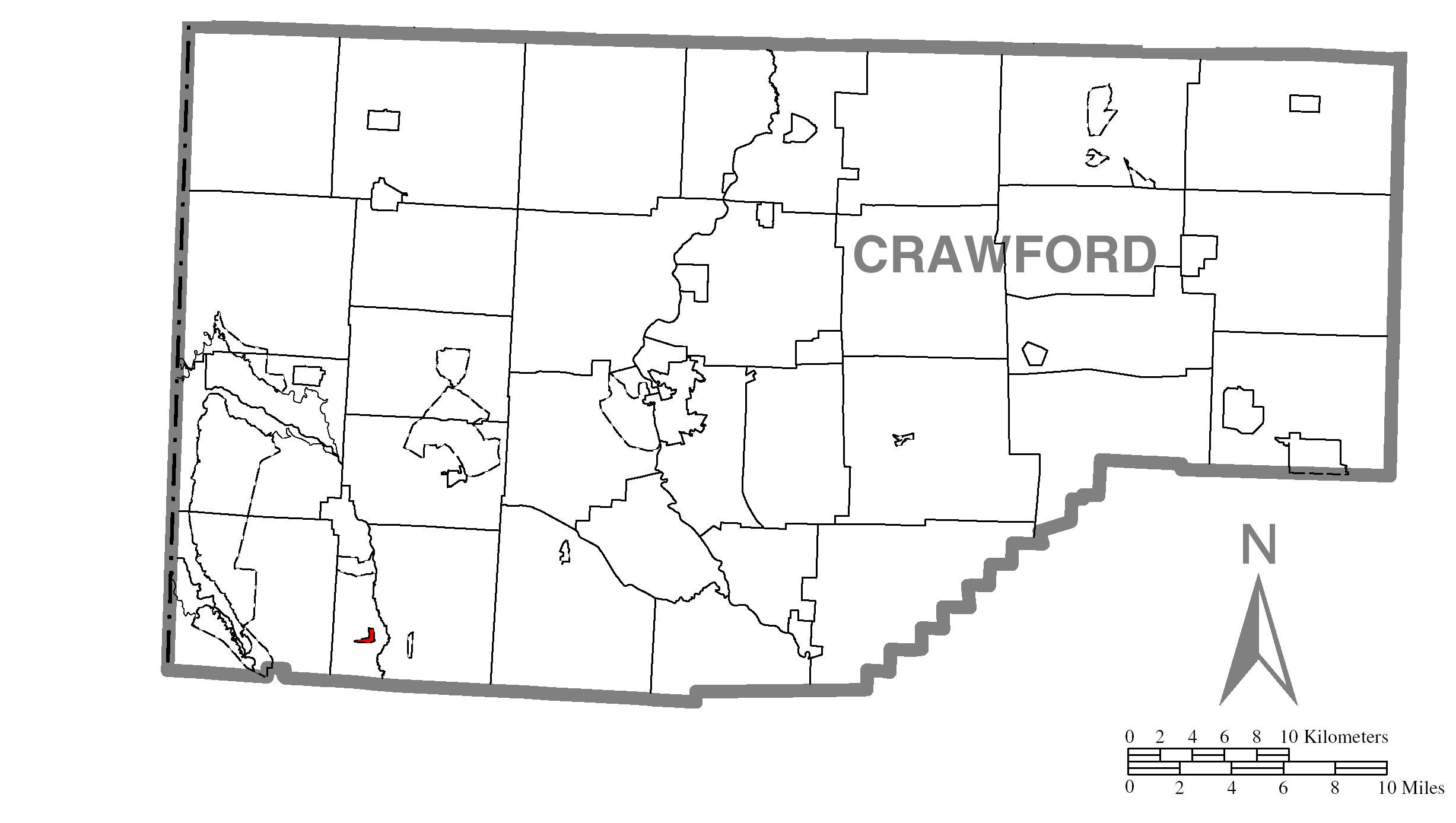
- Location of Adamsville in Crawford County

- Location of Crawford County in Pennsylvania
- Coordinates: 41°30′38″N 80°22′11″W
- Country: United States
- State: Pennsylvania
- County: Crawford
- Township: West Fallowfield

Area
  - Total: 0.39 sq mi (1.02 km^{2})
  - Land: 0.39 sq mi (1.02 km^{2})
  - Water: 0 sq mi (0.00 km^{2})
- Elevation: 1,040 ft (320 m)

Population (2020)
  - Total: 88
  - Density: 223.6/sq mi (86.32/km^{2})
- Time zone: UTC-4 (EST)
  - Summer (DST): UTC-5 (EDT)
- ZIP code: 16110
- Area code: 814
- FIPS code: 42-00372

Adamsville is a census-designated place (CDP) in Crawford County, Pennsylvania, United States. As of the 2020 census, Adamsville had a population of 88.

Adamsville is an unincorporated community located in Fallowfield Township, Crawford County, Pennsylvania situated in the Crooked Creek Valley. The community was founded in the early 19th century and grew around the local canal system. Originally known as Owrytown, it was later renamed in honor of its first settler Adam Owry. Information from History of Crawford County, Pennsylvania book written by Samuel P. Bates.

== History ==
The area that became Adamsville was first settled by the Owry family in the early 1800. The community originally grew around a blacksmith shop operated by Adam Owry, because of his importance to the early settlement the area was first known to local residents as Owrytown.

The community began to grow more rapidly during the construction of a nearby canal on February 8th 1841. Henry Owry officially mapped out (platted) the village into 64 individual lots. After this official layout was made the village changed its name from Owrytown to Adamsville continuing to honor Adam Owry.

(Note: Depending on the historical record, the founder's name is sometimes spelled Owrey or Oury)

The earliest businesses in the county were run by the founding family. George Owry was one of the town's first tavern-keepers and Frank Owry build and ran the local saw mill.

By the year 1885, the population of Adamsville had reached about 150 people. Historical county records show that the town had become a busy local hub with several businesses including two general stores, a drug store, a hardware store, a furniture store, two blacksmith shops, a harness shop and two shoe shops. Information obtained from History of Crawford County, an 1885 regional history book published in Chicago by Warner, Beers & Company. Written by Samuel P. Bates.

== Geography ==
Adamsville is located in southwestern Crawford County at 41°30′38″N 80°22′11″W (41.510643, -80.369802), in southern West Fallowfield Township. Pennsylvania Route 18 passes through the community, leading north 3 miles (5 km) to Hartstown and south 8 miles (13 km) to Greenville.

According to the United States Census Bureau, the CDP has a total area of 0.18 square miles (0.46 km^{2}), all land.

== Demographics ==
Historical population
Census	Pop.	Note	%±
2020	88		—
U.S. Decennial Census

As of the census of 2000, there were 117 people, 49 households, and 39 families residing in the CDP. The population density was 698.4 inhabitants per square mile (269.7/km^{2}). There were 54 housing units at an average density of 322.4 per square mile (124.5/km^{2}). The racial makeup of the CDP was 100.00% White.

There were 49 households, out of which 28.6% had children under the age of 18 living with them, 65.3% were married couples living together, 8.2% had a female householder with no husband present, and 20.4% were non-families. 20.4% of all households were made up of individuals, and 14.3% had someone living alone who was 65 years of age or older. The average household size was 2.39 and the average family size was 2.72.

In the CDP the population was spread out, with 19.7% under the age of 18, 7.7% from 18 to 24, 28.2% from 25 to 44, 22.2% from 45 to 64, and 22.2% who were 65 years of age or older. The median age was 42 years. For every 100 females there were 105.3 males. For every 100 females age 18 and over, there were 91.8 males.

The median income for a household in the CDP was $29,821, and the median income for a family was $34,167. Males had a median income of $32,500 versus $16,250 for females. The per capita income for the CDP was $17,351. None of the population and none of the families were below the poverty line.
