= Altamont, Pennsylvania =

Unincorporated community in Pennsylvania, US

Altamont
- Census-designated place
- Location within the U.S. state of Pennsylvania Altamont (the United States)
- Coordinates: 40°47′0″N 76°13′22″W
- Country: United States
- State: Pennsylvania
- County: Schuylkill

Area
  - Total: 0.92 sq mi (2.39 km^{2})
  - Land: 0.92 sq mi (2.39 km^{2})
  - Water: 0 sq mi (0.00 km^{2})

Population (2020)
  - Total: 624
  - Density: 675.7/sq mi (260.88/km^{2})
- Time zone: UTC-5 (Eastern (EST))
  - Summer (DST): UTC-4 (EDT)
- FIPS code: 42-02144

Altamont is a census-designated place (CDP) in West Mahanoy Township, Pennsylvania, United States. The population was 624 at the 2020 census.

== Geography ==
Altamont is located at 40°47′0″N 76°13′22″W (40.783382, -76.222798).

According to the United States Census Bureau, the CDP has a total area of 0.9 square miles (2.3 km^{2}), all land.

== Demographics ==
Historical population
Census	Pop.	Note	%±
2020	624		—
U.S. Decennial Census

At the 2000 census there were 2,689 people, 305 households, and 203 families living in the CDP. The population density was 2,857.1 inhabitants per square mile (1,103.1/km^{2}). There were 329 housing units at an average density of 349.6 per square mile (135.0/km^{2}). The racial makeup of the CDP was 53.63% White, 41.17% African American, 0.04% Native American, 0.63% Asian, 4.31% from other races, and 0.22% from two or more races. Hispanic or Latino of any race were 7.66%.

Of the 305 households 20.3% had children under the age of 18 living with them, 51.1% were married couples living together, 9.5% had a female householder with no husband present, and 33.4% were non-families. 30.2% of households were one person and 21.6% were one person aged 65 or older. The average household size was 2.31 and the average family size was 2.87.

The age distribution was 4.4% under the age of 18, 18.0% from 18 to 24, 55.2% from 25 to 44, 14.9% from 45 to 64, and 7.5% 65 or older. The median age was 34 years. For every 100 females, there were 668.3 males. For every 100 females age 18 and over, there were 771.5 males.

The median household income was $23,603 and the median family income was $27,375. Males had a median income of $15,372 versus $16,875 for females. The per capita income for the CDP was $12,151. About 5.3% of families and 8.0% of the population were below the poverty line, including 5.0% of those under age 18 and 3.2% of those age 65 or over.

== Education ==
The school district is Shenandoah Valley School District.
