= Levi Sheard Mill =

- U.S. National Register of Historic Places
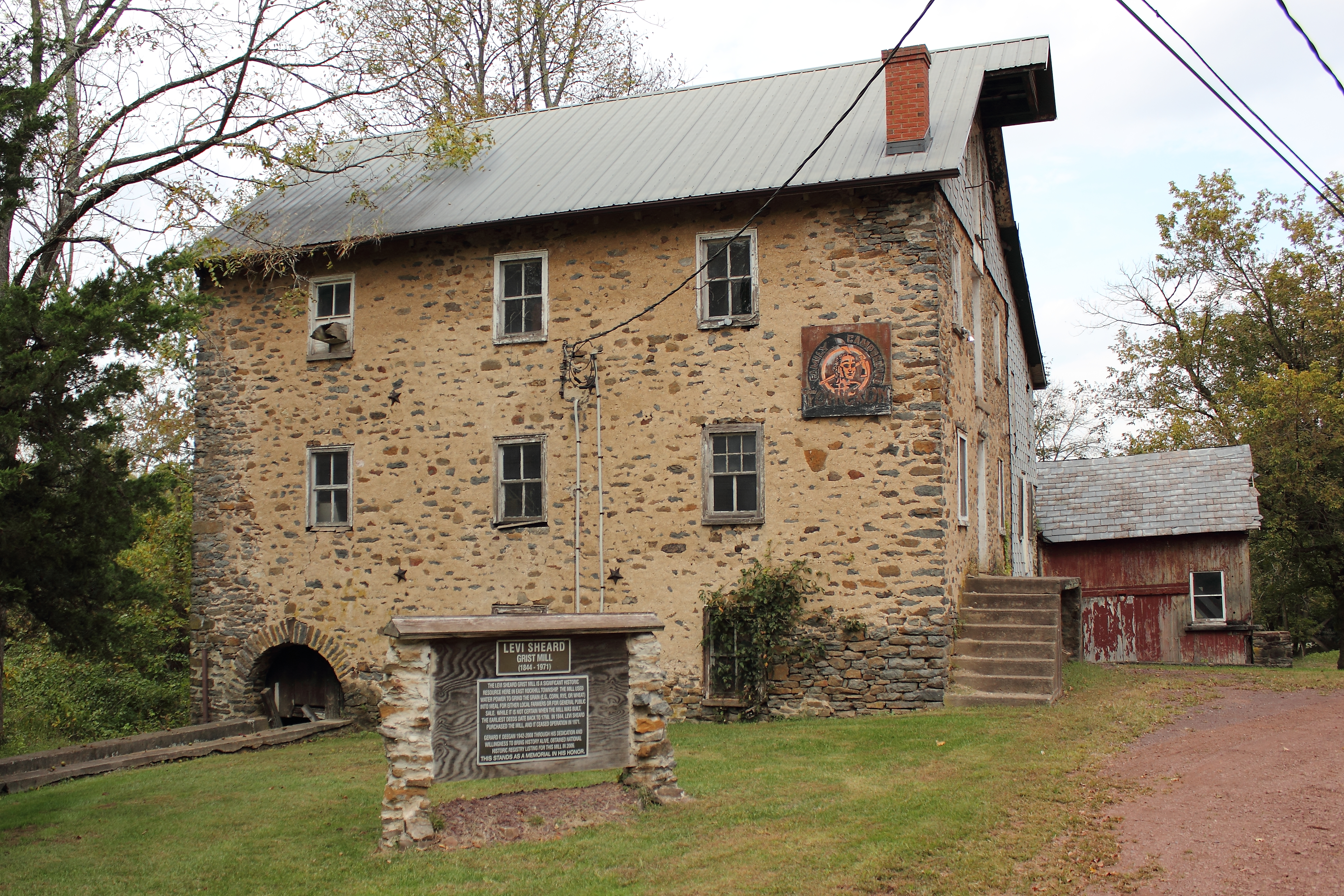
- Levi Sheard Mill, September 2012

- Location within Pennsylvania Location within the United States
- Location: 8308 Covered Bridge Road, East Rockhill Township, Pennsylvania
- Coordinates: 40°27′17″N 75°16′44″W
- Built: c. 1825, c. 1850, c. 1870, c. 1905
- Architectural style: Georgian
- NRHP reference No.: 06001149
- Added to NRHP: December 18, 2006

The Levi Sheard Mill, also known as Sheard's Mill and the John S. Clymer Mill, is an historic grist mill in East Rockhill Township, Bucks County, Pennsylvania, United States.

It was placed on the National Register of Historic Places on December 18, 2006. The Sheard's Mill Covered Bridge, which is situated next to the mill, is also listed on the National Register of Historic Places.

== History and architectural features ==
The first section of this historic structure was built circa 1825, with three additions built into the early twentieth century. The mill was purchased by Levi Sheard in 1844. In 1916, ownership was transferred to brothers Rubin and John Clymer. The mill continued to operate until the 1970s.

A sign placed in front of the mill indicates the importance of the grist mill to the surrounding area. Currently the property is used as a campground.
