= Ambridge Heights, Pennsylvania =

- Unincorporated community Census designated place
- Location within Pennsylvania Location within the United States
- Coordinates: 40°35′31.2″N 80°12′43.2″W
- Country: United States
- State: Pennsylvania
- County: Beaver
- Township: Harmony

Area
  - Total: 0.956 sq mi (2.48 km^{2})
  - Land: 0.956 sq mi (2.48 km^{2})
  - Water: 0.000 sq mi (0 km^{2})
- Time zone: UTC-5 (Eastern (EST))
  - Summer (DST): UTC-4 (EDT)
- FIPS code: 42-02296
- GNIS feature ID: 28-30741

Ambridge Heights is an unincorporated community and census designated place (CDP) in Harmony Township, Beaver County, Pennsylvania.

== Demographics ==
Historical population
Census	Pop.	Note	%±
U.S. Decennial Census

The United States Census Bureau first defined Ambridge Heights as a census designated place in 2023.
