= Haycock Mountain =

Mountain in Pennsylvania, United States

- Location within Pennsylvania

Highest point
- Elevation: 974 feet (297 m)
- Prominence: 400 ft (120 m)
- Coordinates: 40°29′19″N 75°13′9″W

Geography
- Location: Bucks County, Pennsylvania, U.S.
- Topo map: USGS Riegelsville

Geology
- Rock age: Triassic
- Mountain type: Intrusive igneous / trap rock

Climbing
- Easiest route: Hike

Haycock Mountain or known as Ghost Mountain is a locally prominent hill with the highest summit in Bucks County. It rises above Nockamixon State Park, in the Delaware River drainage of southeastern Pennsylvania. Early settlers named it simply for its "resemblance to a cock of hay."

Haycock is covered with numerous triassic diabase boulders, and is a bouldering destination with many established routes ranging from V0 to V10+. To the north northwest of the main peak is a secondary peak of approximately 820 feet (250 m)sometimes known as 'Little Haycock', and the main peak overlooks Lake Nockamixon to the southeast.

Contained within the Tohickon Creek watershed, Haycock Mountain is drained by Dimple Creek to the west and Haycock Creek to the east.

Since it lies within State Game Land Number 157, Haycock is used seasonally for hunting.

== Geology ==
Haycock Mountain was formed 200 million years ago by an intrusion of magma into local shale and argillite within the Newark Basin. As the magma cooled it became a large mass of erosion resistant diabase below the surface. Millions of years of weathering then stripped away overlying layers of shale and argillite to expose the durable diabase to the surface, creating Haycock mountain as it appears today.

In addition to diabase, Haycock Mountain features a large area underlain by hornfels, or local sedimentary rock that has been baked by the heat of the magma intrusion. The baked rock is most prominent within a few hundred feet of the intrusion, appearing as a dark gray hornfels. However, the magma's heat was extensive enough to produce maroon hornfels nearly a mile away.
