= Lake Towhee Park =

Park in Bucks County, Pennsylvania, United States

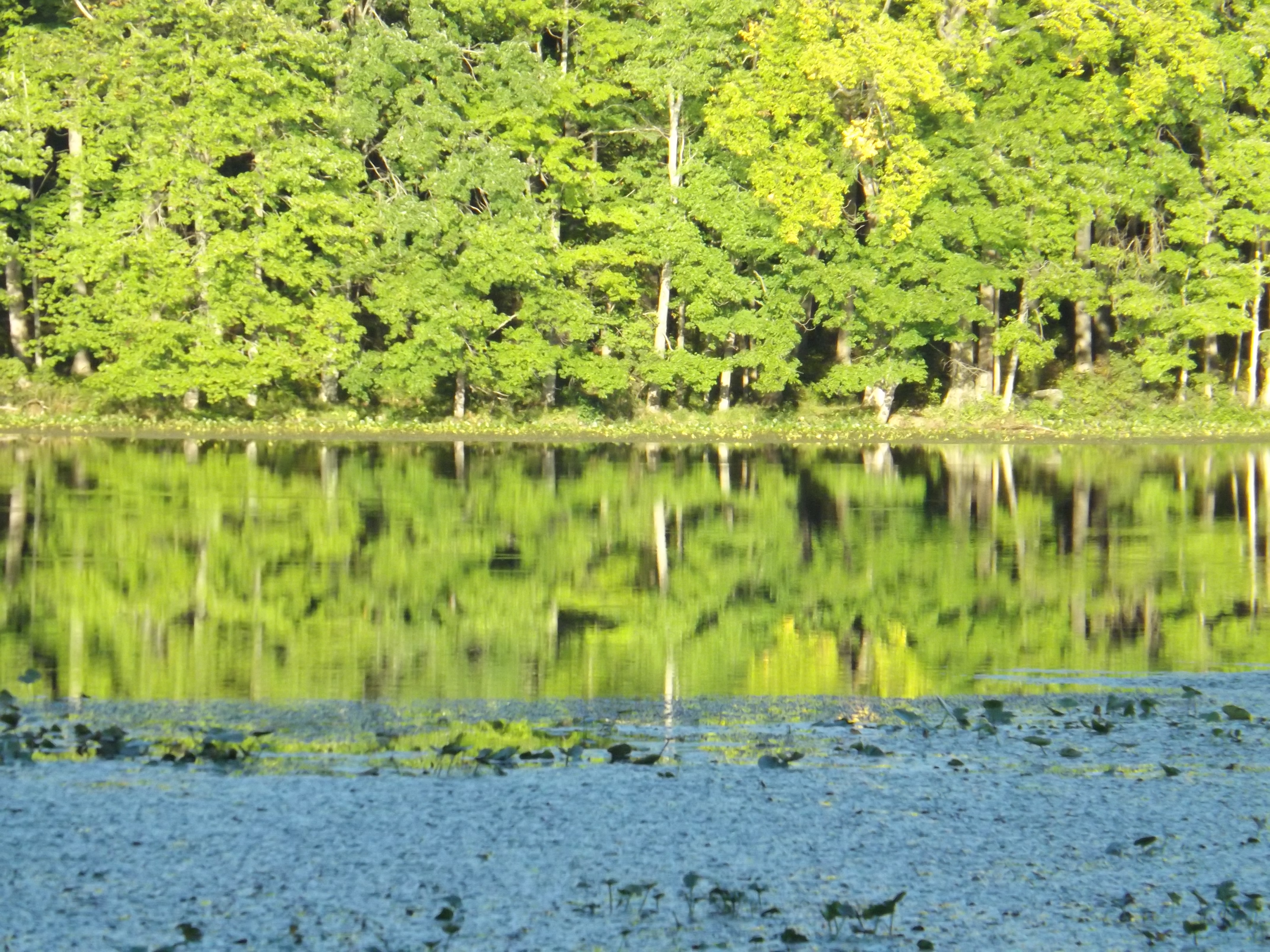
- Light reflecting off Lake Towhee in late Summer of 2016.

- Location within Pennsylvania
- Location: Applebachsville, Bucks County, Pennsylvania, U.S.
- Coordinates: 40.4781°N 75.2684°W
- Area: 549 acres (222 ha)

Lake Towhee Park spans 549 acres (222 ha), and is part of the Bucks County, Pennsylvania (U.S.) park system. It's located in the northern part of the county in the village of Applebachsville, which is a few miles from the borough of Quakertown. The lake is central to the park and spans 50 acres (20 ha). The lake is formed from a dam on Kimples Creek. The park is within a few miles of the larger Lake Nockamixon state park.

== Activities ==
The park offers a variety of activities, including a playground, picnicking, ball field, fishing, hiking, sightseeing, and group and individual camping. Roofed pavilions are available for rental use. Swimming is not permitted in the lake.

== Wildlife ==
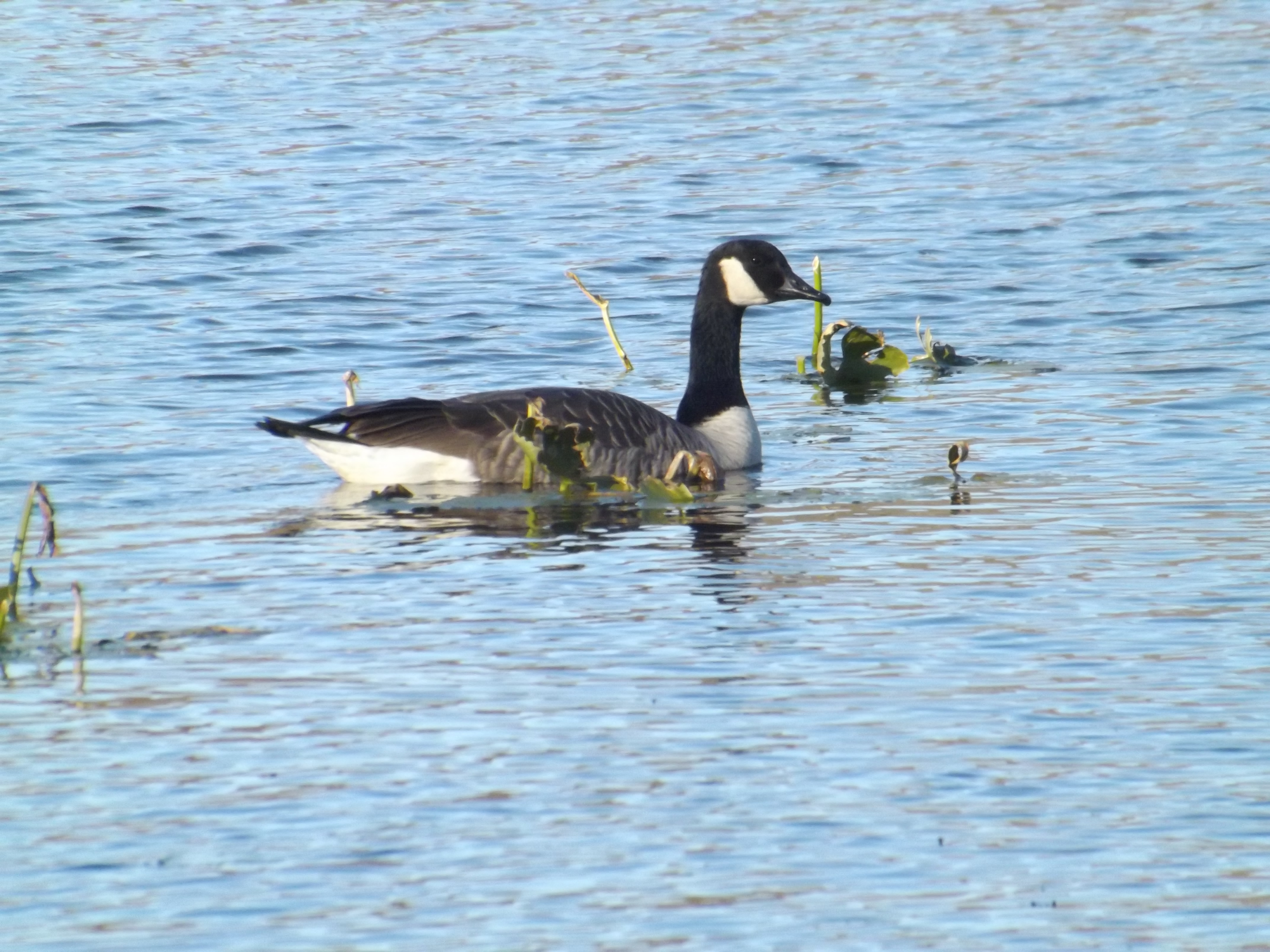
Goose paddling in Lake Towhee in the Autumn of 2016.

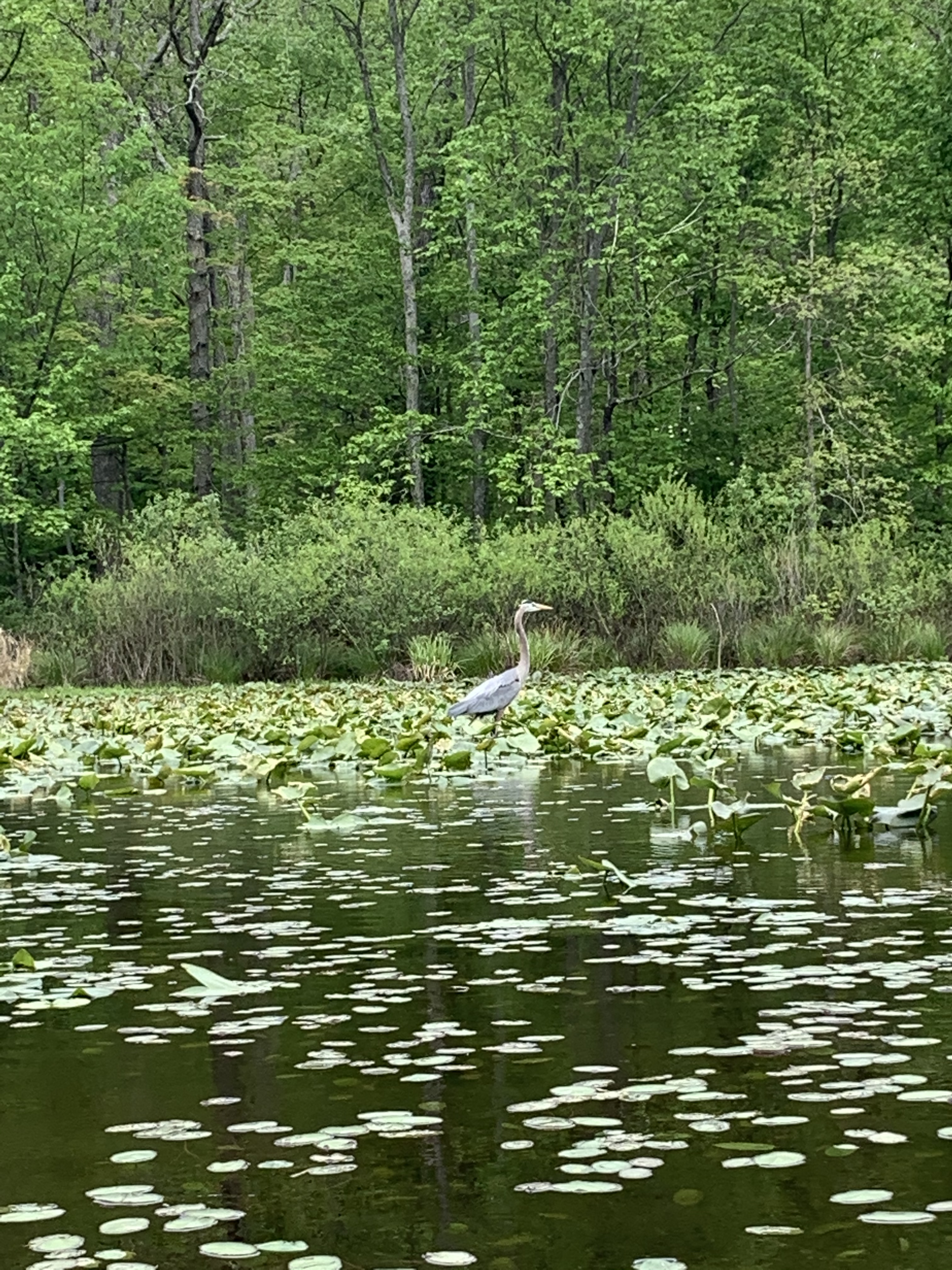
A Blue Heron at Lake Towhee Park

Wildlife in the park includes beaver, raccoon, mink, and deer. Bird species present included geese, ducks, hawks, and blue heron. The wildlife and other natural aspects of the park make it a good location for sightseeing and photography.

== Water chestnuts invasive species ==
The lake has had a problem of being overrun with water chestnuts (water caltrops), an invasive species which crowds out native species. The plant, which evolved in Europe and Asia, is destructive to the native plants, fish, and birds. Volunteer groups have been organized to pull out the invasive weeds to help control the growth.

In addition to the water chestnuts, in the summer, a large portion of the lake becomes covered in lily pads, which can add challenge and opportunity for fishing.
