= Accomac (YTB-812) =

Tugboat of the United States Navy

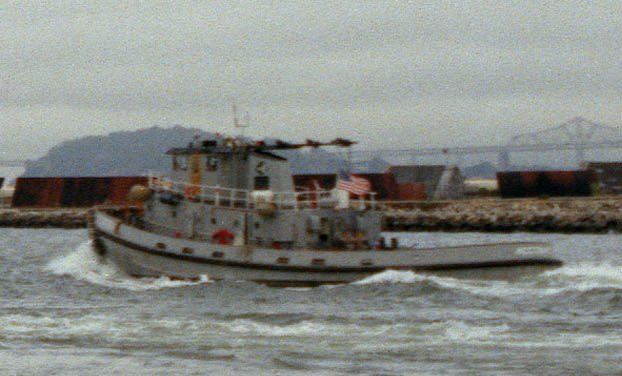
- USS Accomac (YTB-812) from the pier at NAS Almeda, California.

History

United States
- Owner: United States Navy
- Awarded: 22 June 1970
- Builder: Peterson Builders
- Laid down: 12 January 1971
- Launched: 8 June 1971
- In service: 1971–2012
- Stricken: 23 March 2012
- Homeport: Puget Sound
- Status: Awaiting disposal

General characteristics
- Class & type: Natick-class large harbor tug
- Displacement: 283 long tons (288 t) (light); 356 long tons (362 t) (full)
- Length: 109 ft (33 m)
- Beam: 31 ft (9.4 m)
- Draft: 14 ft (4.3 m)
- Propulsion: Diesel, single screw
- Speed: 12 knots (14 mph; 22 km/h)
- Crew: 12
- Armament: None

Accomac (YTB-812) was a United States Navy Natick-class large harbor tug named for Accomac, Virginia.

== Construction ==
The contract for Accomac was awarded 22 June 1970. She was laid down on 12 January 1971 at Sturgeon Bay, Wisconsin, by Peterson Builders and launched 8 June 1971.

== Operational history ==
Delivered to the Navy on 17 November 1971 and placed in service during December 1971, Accomac began duty in the 12th Naval District sometime in 1972. She served with Naval Region Northwest for the duration of her career. Stricken from the Navy List 23 March 2012, ex-Accomac awaits disposal.
