= Hartstown, Pennsylvania =

Unincorporated community in Pennsylvania, US

- Census-designated place
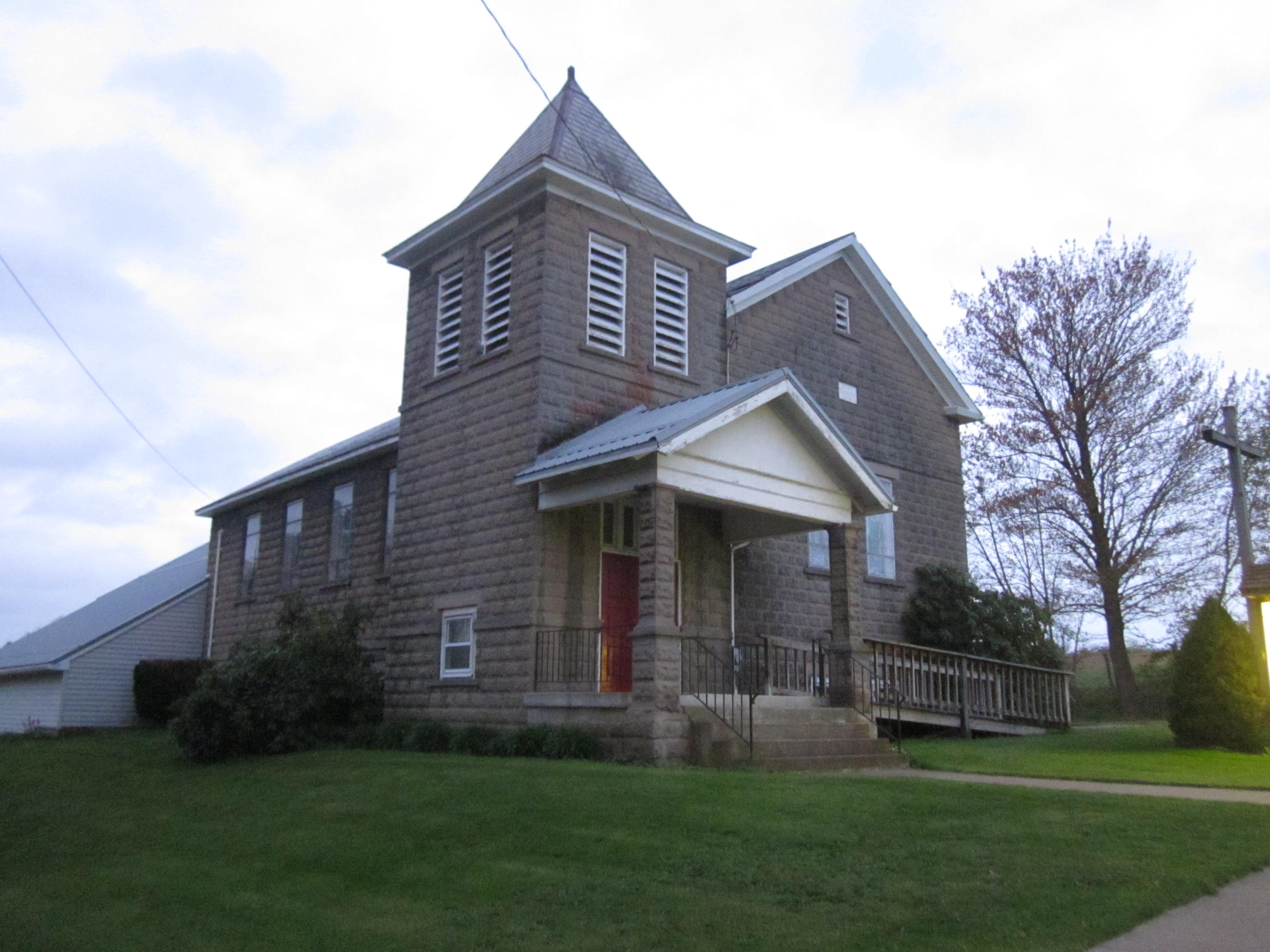

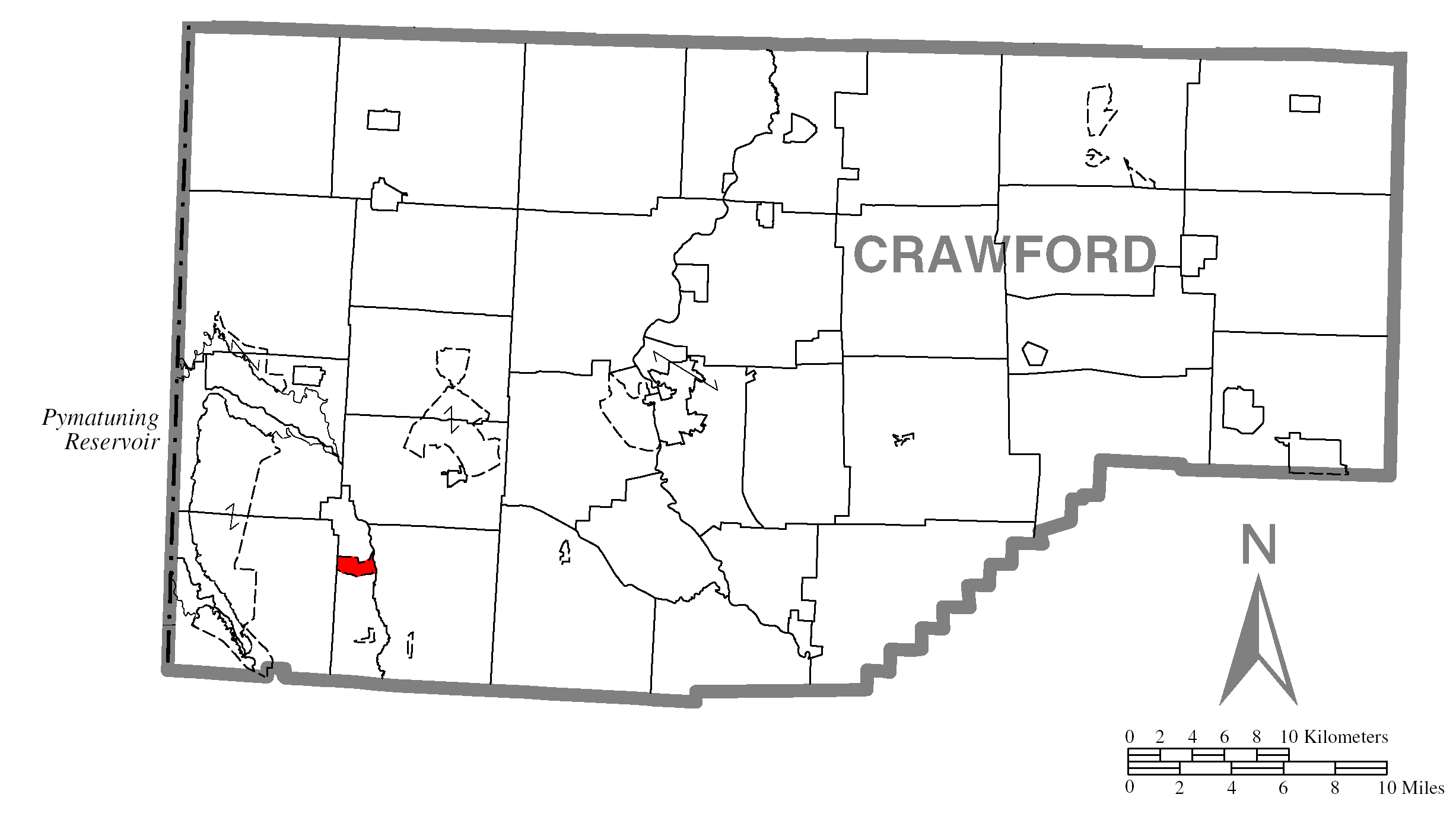
- Location of Hartstown in Crawford County

- Location of Crawford County in Pennsylvania
- Coordinates: 41°33′4″N 80°22′39″W
- Country: United States
- State: Pennsylvania
- County: Crawford County
- Township: West Fallowfield

Area
  - Total: 0.84 sq mi (2.17 km^{2})
  - Land: 0.82 sq mi (2.12 km^{2})
  - Water: 0.019 sq mi (0.05 km^{2})
- Elevation: 1,040 ft (320 m)

Population (2020)
  - Total: 146
  - Density: 178.1/sq mi (68.77/km^{2})
- Time zone: UTC-4 (EST)
  - Summer (DST): UTC-5 (EDT)
- ZIP code: 16131
- Area code: 814
- FIPS code: 42-32976

Hartstown is a census-designated place (CDP) in Crawford County, Pennsylvania, United States. The population was 201 at the 2010 census, down from 246 in 2000.

== History ==
The Dr. James White House was added to the National Register of Historic Places in 1980 and delisted in 2004.

== Geography ==
Hartstown is located in southwestern Crawford County at 41°33′4″N 80°22′39″W (41.551126, -80.377475), in the northern part of West Fallowfield Township. U.S. Route 322 and Pennsylvania Route 18 intersect in the center of town. US 322 leads southwest 6 miles (10 km) to Jamestown, while PA 18 leads south 11 miles (18 km) to Greenville. The two highways together lead northeast 5 miles (8 km) to Conneaut Lake.

According to the United States Census Bureau, the Hartstown CDP has a total area of 0.82 square miles (2.13 km^{2}), of which 0.81 square miles (2.10 km^{2}) is land and 0.01 square miles (0.03 km^{2}), or 1.45%, is water.

== Demographics ==
Historical population
Census	Pop.	Note	%±
2020	146		—
U.S. Decennial Census

As of the census of 2000, there were 246 people, 95 households, and 66 families residing in the CDP. The population density was 284.1 inhabitants per square mile (109.7/km^{2}). There were 111 housing units at an average density of 128.2 per square mile (49.5/km^{2}). The racial makeup of the CDP was 96.75% White, 0.81% Native American, 0.41% from other races, and 2.03% from two or more races. Hispanic or Latino of any race were 0.81% of the population.

There were 95 households, out of which 33.7% had children under the age of 18 living with them, 44.2% were married couples living together, 13.7% had a female householder with no husband present, and 30.5% were non-families. 23.2% of all households were made up of individuals, and 6.3% had someone living alone who was 65 years of age or older. The average household size was 2.59 and the average family size was 2.97.

In the CDP, the population was spread out, with 25.6% under the age of 18, 11.8% from 18 to 24, 28.0% from 25 to 44, 23.2% from 45 to 64, and 11.4% who were 65 years of age or older. The median age was 33 years. For every 100 females, there were 90.7 males. For every 100 females age 18 and over, there were 90.6 males.

The median income for a household in the CDP was $28,906, and the median income for a family was $31,354. Males had a median income of $28,906 versus $17,500 for females. The per capita income for the CDP was $12,199. About 12.7% of families and 20.6% of the population were below the poverty line, including 28.4% of those under the age of eighteen and 10.0% of those sixty five or over.

== Notable people ==
- Grace Espy Patton (1896–1904), American state superintendent of schools
