= Acahela, Pennsylvania =

Acahela is an historic community located in Monroe County, Pennsylvania, United States. It had a summer post office that operated from 1930 until 1944.

Camp Acahela is a 242-acre year-round camp operated by the Boy Scouts of America near the confluence of the Lehigh River and Tobyhanna Creek in Tobyhanna Township, Monroe County. It is located at 41.1202°N 75.6367°W.

== Sources ==
- Journal of the American Philatelist, published monthly. State College, Pennsylvania. 072000/p647
