= Timothy Krajcir =

American serial killer

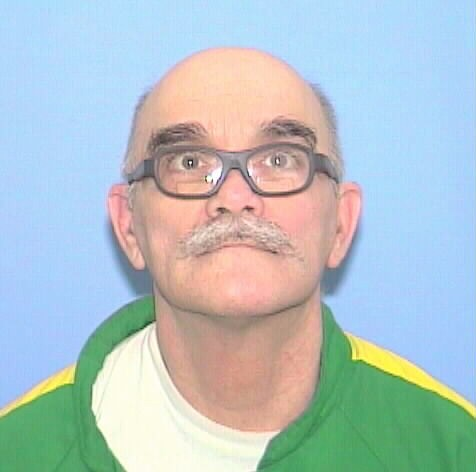
- Krajcir photo from the Illinois Department of Corrections
- Born: Timothy Wayne McBride; November 28, 1944 (age 81); West Mahanoy Township, Pennsylvania, U.S.
- Height: 5 ft 11 in (1.80 m)
- Status: Incarcerated
- Convictions: Illinois; Murder (2 counts); Missouri; First degree murder (5 counts); Rape (7 counts); Robbery (1 count)
- Penalty: Illinois; 80 years Missouri; 13 consecutive life terms

Details
- Victims: 9
- Span of crimes: 1977–1982
- States: Missouri; Illinois; Pennsylvania; Kentucky
- Date apprehended: 29 August 2007
- Imprisoned at: Pontiac Correctional Center

Timothy Wayne Krajcir (pronounced /ˈkraɪtʃər/) (né McBride; born November 28, 1944) is a convicted American serial killer from West Mahanoy Township, Pennsylvania who has confessed to killing nine women: five in Missouri and four others in Illinois, Kentucky, and Pennsylvania.

== Early life ==
Krajcir was born Timothy Wayne McBride in West Mahanoy Township, Pennsylvania to Charles McBride and Fern Yost on November 28, 1944. In 1945, when Timothy was around a year old, his father abandoned the family, leaving Yost to raise him on her own. In 1949 or 1950 when Timothy was either 5 or 6, Yost met and married Bernie Krajcir.

=== Early criminal and deviant behavior ===
Krajcir became engaged in criminal and deviant behavior early in life. He was charged with petty theft of a bicycle in Harrisburg at age six in 1951; became engaged in voyeurism and exhibitionism at age 13, in 1958; and was again charged with petty theft in New Milford, Pennsylvania at age 15, in 1960.

=== Adoption and education ===
Timothy McBride was legally adopted by his stepfather, Bernie Krajcir, and his surname legally changed from McBride to Krajcir in 1953. At the age of 10, Timothy Krajcir began to develop an unhealthy sexual and emotional obsession with his mother.

Krajcir later enrolled at Southern Illinois University Carbondale, where he earned a BA in the administration of justice with a minor in psychology.

=== U.S. Navy ===
He enlisted in the U.S. Navy at age 17, in 1962, and participated in basic training in Great Lakes, Illinois. He was dishonorably discharged for sexual assault in 1963 after fourteen months of service.

== Crimes ==
=== Arrests and convictions ===
Krajcir first entered the Illinois prison system in 1963 on a rape conviction. Since then, he has spent most of his adult life behind bars for sex crimes, except for a brief period of freedom in the late 1970s and early 1980s. During this brief period, he killed at least nine women. Krajcir has been incarcerated since 1982.

In spring 1983, at age 38, he was arrested in Allentown, Pennsylvania after police found him in his car, holding a pistol, which was a violation of his parole terms. On May 3, 1983, he attempted a failed escape from prison in Allentown, breaking his leg in the process. Later that year, he was tried and convicted for indecent assaults, robbery, criminal trespassing and sentenced to 2 1/2 years to 5 years in Pennsylvania prison. He served five years in Graterford State Prison in Skippack Township, Pennsylvania. Following completion of his Pennsylvania sentence in 1988 at age 43, he was moved to Big Muddy River Correctional Center in Ina, Illinois to complete sentencing terms for parole violations and violating his prior conditional release terms. There, he chose to remain in prison, saying he did not wish to hurt anyone. He also ceased attempting to convince officials that he wished to change his criminal ways, and he stopped attending prison therapy sessions. He remained in prison for nearly 20 years, from the age of 42 to 62.

=== Serial murders ===
In carrying out his crimes, Krajcir would travel to various towns that he had no connection to, stalk his victims, and then break into their homes and wait for them to arrive. In 1977, Krajcir was released from prison after serving time for rape, and as a condition of his parole, he was required to enroll at Southern Illinois University Carbondale. There, in 1981, he earned a degree in Administrative Justice with a minor in psychology.

Some victims were found tied up in their beds. Others were kidnapped and transported across state lines before they were killed. Most of them were raped and forced to perform sexual acts. Some were killed by a gunshot to the head. Others were stabbed or asphyxiated. There was little evidence pointing to any of the rapes or murders being linked or to them having been committed by the same person. The lack of forensic and DNA technology at the time and the multiple methods of murder made it difficult for investigators to link all the crimes to a single suspect.

=== Known victims ===
Timeline of Krajcir's crimes.

- Brenda Parsh, 27 - August 12, 1977, Cape Girardeau, Missouri
- Mary Parsh, 58 - August 12, 1977, Cape Girardeau, Missouri
- Sheila Cole, 21 - November 17, 1977, McClure, Illinois
- Virginia Lee Witte, 51 - May 12, 1978, Marion, Illinois
- Joyce Tharp, 29 - March 23, 1979 Paducah, Kentucky
- Myrtle Rupp, 51 - April 17, 1979, Muhlenberg Township, Pennsylvania
- Ida White, 72 (survived) - September 7, 1981, Mount Vernon, Illinois
- Margie Call, 57 - January 27, 1982, Cape Girardeau, Missouri
- Deborah Sheppard, 23 - April 8, 1982, Carbondale, Illinois
- Mildred Wallace, 65 - June 21, 1982, Cape Girardeau, Missouri

=== Sentencing ===
In August 2007, Krajcir was finally connected to a murder because of DNA evidence left at the crime scene. At the time of the commission of the crime, DNA testing was not available, but as DNA analysis advanced, testing became possible. Krajcir was sentenced on December 10, 2007, to 40 years in prison for the 1982 killing of Southern Illinois University Carbondale student Deborah Sheppard and charged with five more counts of murder and three counts of rape against women in the Cape Girardeau area from 1977 to 1982.

On January 18, 2008, Krajcir pleaded guilty and was sentenced to another 40 years in prison for the 1978 killing of Marion, Illinois resident Virginia Lee Witte. On April 4, 2008, he pleaded guilty to the murder of five women in Cape Girardeau, Missouri, to seven sexual assaults, and one robbery. He was then sentenced to an additional 13 consecutive life terms. Relatives of the victims agreed to the plea bargain, which saved Krajcir from a possible death sentence.

At his sentencing in April 2008, Krajcir stated, "I don't know if I could have been so generous if I were in the same situation. Thank you for sparing my life."

Krajcir is currently held at the Pontiac Correctional Center in Pontiac, Illinois.

== See also ==
- List of serial killers in the United States
