= Ambau, Pennsylvania =

Unincorporated community in Pennsylvania, US

Coordinates: 39°51′05″N 76°53′35″W

Ambau is an unincorporated community in York County, Pennsylvania, United States. Ambau is situated in North Codorus Township near the village of Menges Mills.

The village was a flagstop station on the Western Maryland Railway's line from York to Hanover. It is believed that the station was originally named "Stambaugh" in recognition of the number of families with that name in the area, a member of which may have been an early stationmaster, but the name was shortened by dropping the first two and final two letters.
