= Accomac, Pennsylvania =

Community in Pennsylvania, U.S.

Accomac is a community in Hellam Township, York County, Pennsylvania, United States, situated on the south bank of the Susquehanna River. It is located at coordinates 40°02′42″N 76°33′50″W at an elevation of 271 ft.
