= Shenandoah Valley School District =

School district in Pennsylvania

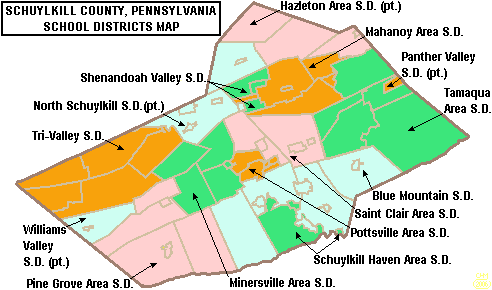
- Location of Shenandoah Valley School District in Schuylkill County, Pennsylvania

Address
- 805 West Centre Street Shenandoah, Schuylkill County, Pennsylvania, 17976-1441; United States

District information
- Type: Public

Other information
- Website: Shenandoah Valley School District website

The Shenandoah Valley School District is a diminutive, rural public school district in Schuylkill County, Pennsylvania. It serves the municipalities of Shenandoah, and West Mahanoy Township. The district encompasses approximately 11 square miles (28 km^{2}) in two noncontiguous areas.

According to 2000 federal census data, it served a resident population of 11,790. By 2010, the district's population declined to 7,940 people. The educational attainment levels for the Shenandoah Valley School District population (25 years old and over) were 79.4% high school graduates and 10.3% college graduates. The district is one of the 500 public school districts of Pennsylvania.

According to the Pennsylvania Budget and Policy Center, 65.7% of the Shenandoah Valley School District's pupils lived at 185% or below the Federal Poverty level as shown by their eligibility for the federal free or reduced price school meal programs in 2012. In 2013 the Pennsylvania Department of Education, reported that 17 students in the Shenandoah Valley School District were homeless. In 2009, Shenandoah Valley School District residents' per capita income was $13,948, while the median family income was $32,598. In Schuylkill County, the median household income was $45,012.

In the Commonwealth, the median family income was $49,501 and the United States median family income was $49,445, in 2010. By 2013, the median household income in the United States rose to $52,100. In 2014, the median household income in the USA was $53,700.

Shenandoah Valley School District operates just two schools: Shenandoah Valley Elementary School and one combined junior-senior high school Shenandoah Valley Junior Senior High School. High school students may choose to attend Schuylkill Technology Centers for training in the construction and mechanical trades as well as other careers. The district also offers SV Virtual Academy for pupils who desire to attend school online. The Schuylkill Intermediate Unit IU29 provides the district with a wide variety of services like specialized education for disabled students and hearing, speech and visual disability services and professional development for staff and faculty.

== Extracurricular activities ==
Shenandoah Valley School District offers a wide variety of clubs, activities and an extensive, publicly funded sports program.

=== Athletics ===
The district's athletic teams include:

Boys

- Baseball - AA
- Basketball- AA
- Cross country - A
- Football - A
- Track and field - AA

Girls

- Basketball - AA
- Cross country - A
- Softball - AA
- Track and field - AA
- Volleyball - A

Junior high school sports

Boys

- Basketball
- Cross country
- Track and field

Girls

- Basketball
- Cross country
- Track and field

According to PIAA directory July 2016.

The Shenandoah Valley girls' basketball team won the District XI championship during the 2014–2015 school year.
