= West Fallowfield Township, Crawford County, Pennsylvania =

Township in Pennsylvania, US

Coordinates: 41°31′00″N 80°22′28″W

- Township
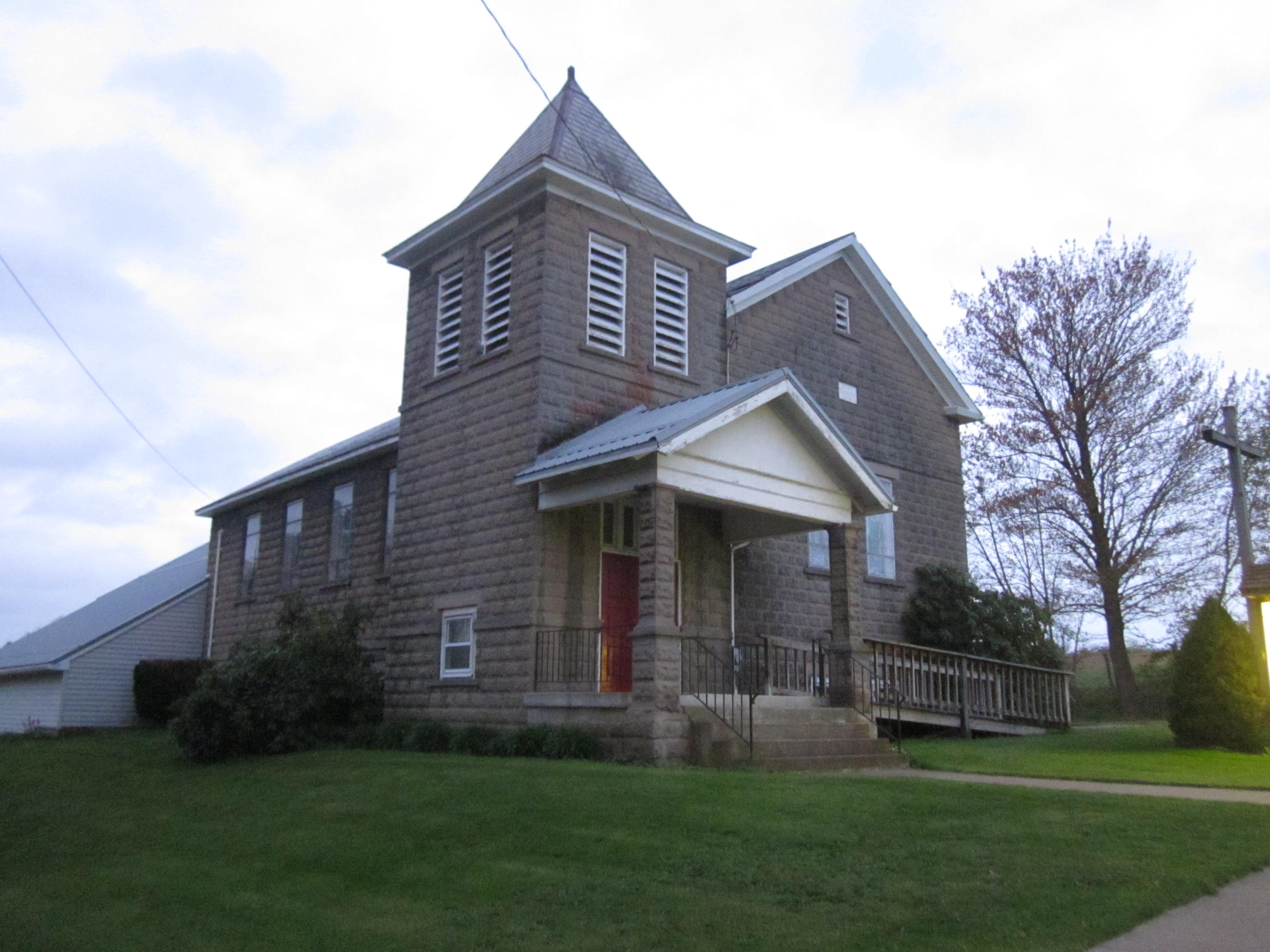
- Church in Hartstown

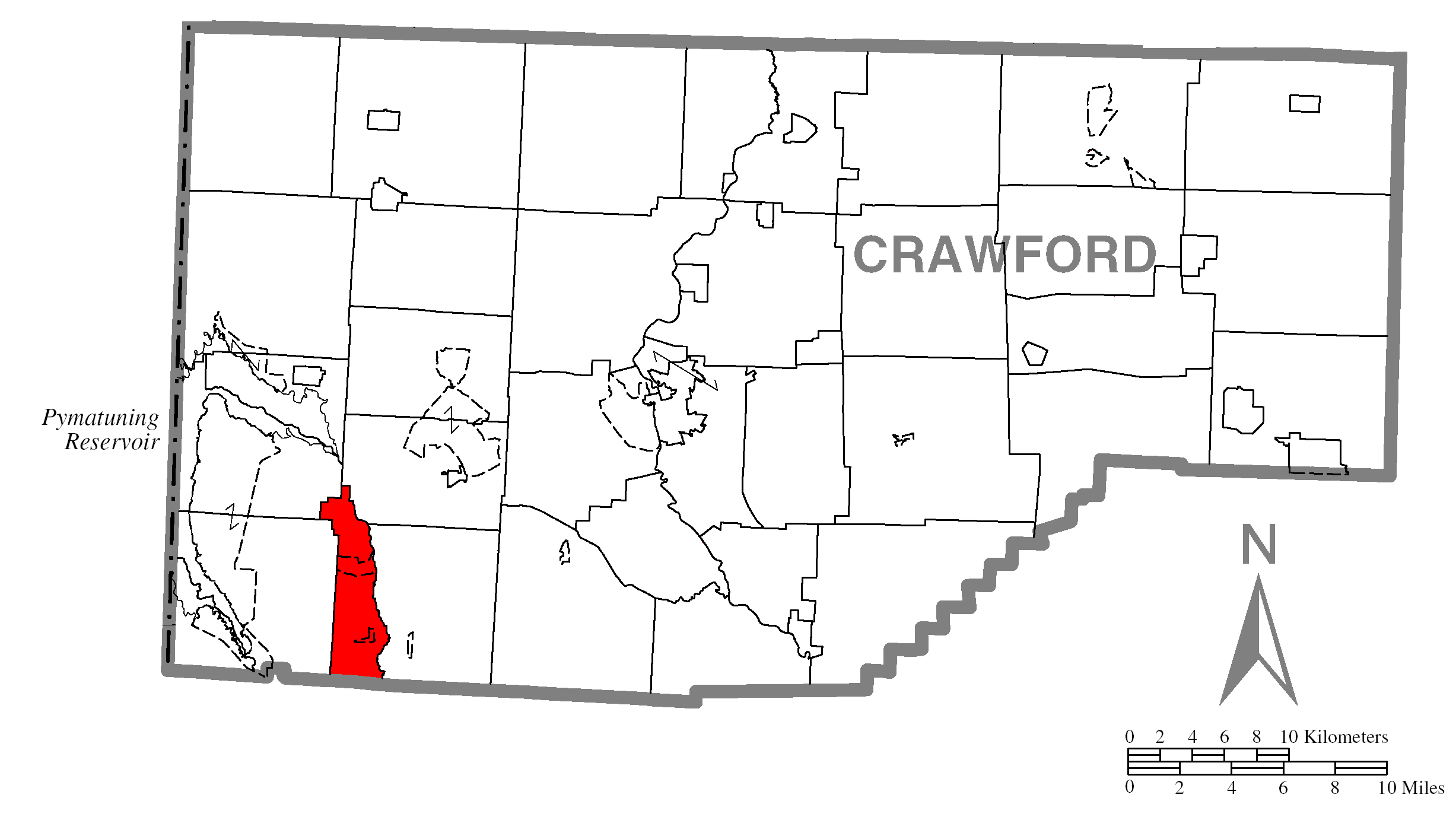
- Location of West Fallowfield Township in Crawford County

- Location of Crawford County in Pennsylvania
- Country: United States
- State: Pennsylvania
- County: Crawford County

Area
  - Total: 11.71 sq mi (30.32 km^{2})
  - Land: 11.60 sq mi (30.05 km^{2})
  - Water: 0.11 sq mi (0.28 km^{2})
- Highest elevation (southwest of Adamsville, Pennsylvania): 1,330 ft (410 m)
- Lowest elevation (Crooked Creek): 980 ft (300 m)

Population (2020)
  - Total: 577 ▼
  - Estimate (2024): 575
  - Density: 50.3/sq mi (19.44/km^{2})
- Time zone: UTC-4 (EST)
  - Summer (DST): UTC-5 (EDT)
- Area code: 814
- FIPS code: 42-039-82944

West Fallowfield Township is a township in Crawford County, Pennsylvania, United States. The population was 577 at the 2020 census, down from 605 at the 2010 census.

== Geography ==
The township is in southwestern Crawford County, bordered to the south by Mercer County. It is bordered to the east by Crooked Creek, Pymatuning Swamp, and the headwaters of the Shenango River. The unincorporated community of Hartstown is in the northern part of the township, and Adamsville is in the south.

According to the United States Census Bureau, the township has a total area of 11.7 square miles (30.3 km^{2}), of which 11.6 square miles (30.0 km^{2}) is land and 0.1 square miles (0.3 km^{2}), or 0.91%, is water.

== Demographics ==
Historical population
Census	Pop.	Note	%±
2000	659		—
2010	605		−8.2%
2020	577		−4.6%
2024 (est.)	575		−0.3%
U.S. Decennial Census

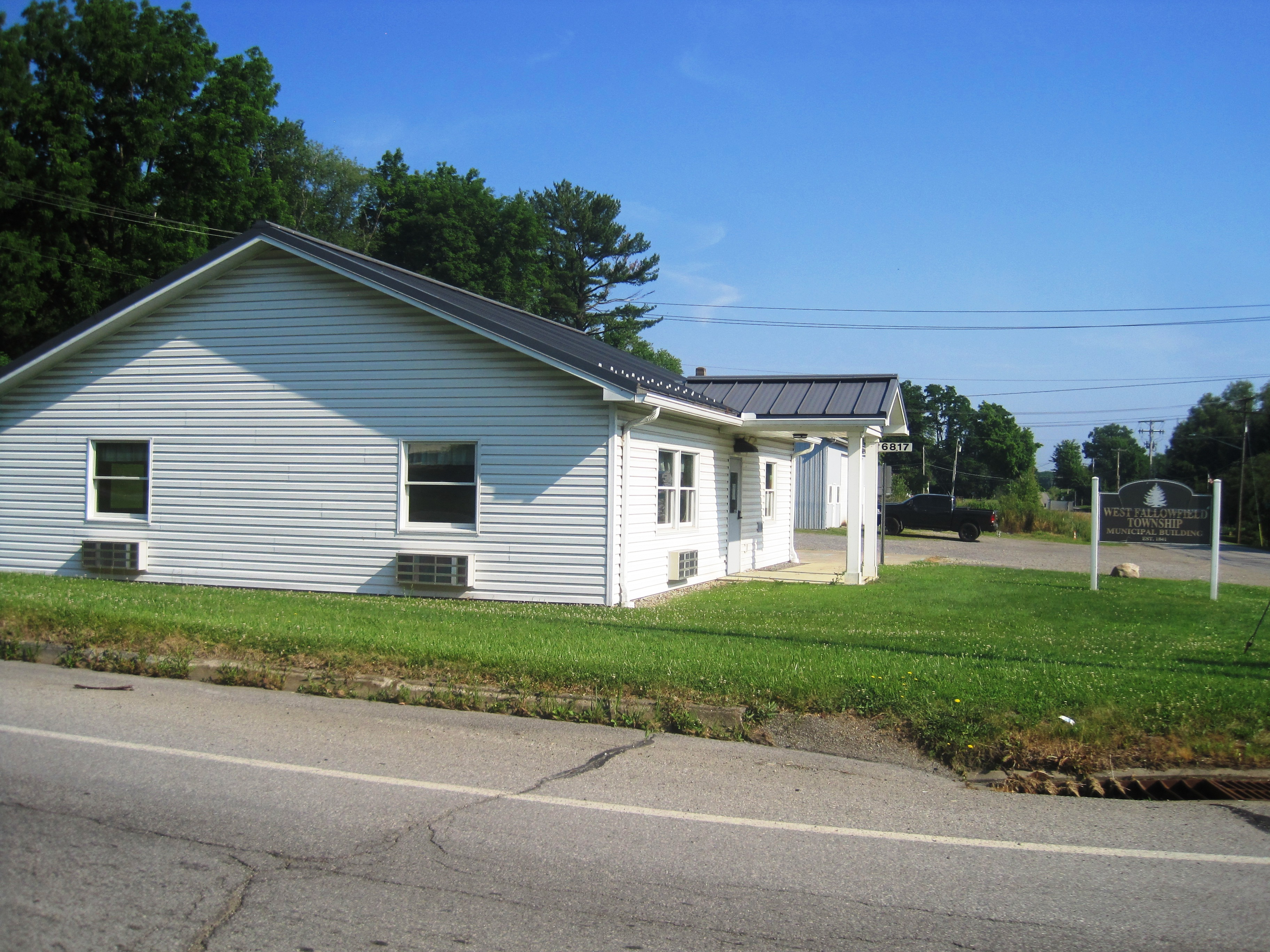
West Fallowfield Township municipal building

As of the census of 2000, there were 659 people, 264 households, and 190 families residing in the township. The population density was 57.1 inhabitants per square mile (22.0/km^{2}). There were 311 housing units at an average density of 26.9 per square mile (10.4/km^{2}). The racial makeup of the township was 96.97% White, 0.15% African American, 0.30% Native American, 0.15% Asian, 0.15% from other races, and 2.28% from two or more races. Hispanic or Latino of any race were 0.30% of the population.

There were 264 households, out of which 30.3% had children under the age of 18 living with them, 54.5% were married couples living together, 9.8% had a female householder with no husband present, and 28.0% were non-families. 23.1% of all households were made up of individuals, and 10.2% had someone living alone who was 65 years of age or older. The average household size was 2.50 and the average family size was 2.91.

In the township the population was spread out, with 23.4% under the age of 18, 8.8% from 18 to 24, 27.5% from 25 to 44, 24.3% from 45 to 64, and 16.1% who were 65 years of age or older. The median age was 40 years. For every 100 females there were 95.0 males. For every 100 females age 18 and over, there were 92.0 males.

The median income for a household in the township was $30,956, and the median income for a family was $34,167. Males had a median income of $30,795 versus $18,304 for females. The per capita income for the township was $14,860. About 4.8% of families and 8.7% of the population were below the poverty line, including 12.0% of those under age 18 and 2.6% of those age 65 or over.
