= Mahanoy =

Mahanoy may refer to:

== Municipalities ==
- Mahanoy City, Pennsylvania, a borough in Schuylkill County
- Mahanoy Township, Pennsylvania
- Little Mahanoy Township, Northumberland County, Pennsylvania
- Lower Mahanoy Township, Northumberland County, Pennsylvania
- Upper Mahanoy Township, Northumberland County, Pennsylvania
- West Mahanoy Township, Pennsylvania, a township in Schuylkill County, Pennsylvania

== Other ==
- Mahanoy Creek, a tributary of the Susquehanna River in east central Pennsylvania
- Mahanoy Area School District, Schuylkill County, Pennsylvania
  - Mahanoy Area School District v. B.L., a Supreme Court case involving the school district
- State Correctional Institution – Mahanoy, a medium-security, correctional facility in Schuylkill County, Pennsylvania

== See also ==
- Lehigh and Mahanoy Railroad, an abandoned railroad in east central Pennsylvania
- Mahanoy Plane, a railroad incline plane in east central Pennsylvania
