= Glenn Ressler =

American football player (born 1943)

- Ressler in 1967

No. 62
- Positions: Guard, center, tackle, defensive tackle

Personal information
- Born: May 21, 1943 (age 83); Dornsife, Pennsylvania, U.S.
- Listed height: 6 ft 3 in (1.91 m)
- Listed weight: 250 lb (113 kg)

Career information
- High school: Mahanoy Joint (Herndon, Pennsylvania)
- College: Penn State (1962–1964)
- NFL draft: 1965: 3rd round, 36th overall pick
- AFL draft: 1965: 3rd round, 17th overall pick

Career history
- Baltimore Colts (1965–1974)

Awards and highlights
- Super Bowl champion (1970); NFL champion (1968); Second-team All-Pro (1968); Consensus All-American (1964); Maxwell Award (1964); College Lineman of the Year (1964); 2× first-team All-East (1963, 1964)

Career NFL statistics
- Games played: 125
- Games started: 98
- Fumble recoveries: 2
- Stats at Pro Football Reference
- College Football Hall of Fame

Glenn Emanuel "Zeke" Ressler (born May 21, 1943) is an American former professional football player who was an offensive lineman for the Baltimore Colts of the National Football League (NFL) from 1965 through 1974. He played college football for the Penn State Nittany Lions.

Ressler was regarded as one of the top collegiate linemen in the country during his junior and senior years of 1963 and 1964, winning the Maxwell Award as America's best all-around player in the latter year. He played both offense and defense in the college ranks, gaining his highest accolades as a middle guard lining up over center on the defense. As a pro, Resseler was used primarily as an offensive lineman, starting at all three line positions. Beginning in his third season, he was a consistent starter at left guard for the Colts.

Ressler was an NFL champion in 1968 and a Superbowl champion in 1970 as a member of the Colts. He was elected to the College Football Hall of Fame in 2001.

== Early life ==
Glenn Ressler was born May 21, 1943, to Maurice and Edna Ressler of Leck Kill, Pennsylvania, a tiny rural hamlet near Dornsife, part of Little Mahanoy Township. He grew up on a farm, forking hay and shocking wheat, and did not play football until high school. He attended Mahanoy Joint High School in Herndon, Pennsylvania — a town in central Pennsylvania with fewer than 1,000 residents.

Ressler was a star center on the Mahanoy team, playing both offense and defense in the era of the single platoon system. Already 6 ft 2 in (1.88 m) tall and weighing 205 pounds (93 kg) during his high school years, he was recognized both as a sound blocker and tackler.

At the end of his senior year in 1960, Ressler was selected as one of three centers named to the Pennsylvania Big 33 list of star football players from Pennsylvania selected by the Harrisburg Patriot News. Joining Ressler on the select list was future Pro Football Hall of Fame quarterback Joe Namath from Beaver Falls.

In 2012, the high school football field in Dornsife was dedicated and renamed in Ressler's honor, and his name is on the scoreboard.

== College career ==
Ressler was awarded a football scholarship to Penn State University in the fall of 1961, on track to soon play for the Nittany Lions. As freshmen were prohibited by NCAA rule from participation in varsity sports, Ressler spent the 1962 season playing for Penn State's freshman football team, where he distinguished himself as a center on offense and a linebacker on defense.

By his 1963 junior season, Ressler was beginning to be recognized as an exceptional defender, playing "middle guard" on defense (nose guard in a five-man defensive line or dropping back to middle linebacker) and shutting down attempted runs up the middle at an all-star level. On the offensive side of the ball, Ressler continued to fill the guard position he had occupied as a sophomore.

The Penn State athletic department began touting Ressler as a potential All-American for 1964, with publicity director Jim Tarman noting: "If we have an All-America candidate next year, he's it. He's a big farm boy from Dornsife, up the river from Harrisburg, and right now he's our toughest lineman."

Penn State line coach Jim O'Hora noted that the now 230-pound Ressler should be one of the best defensive linemen of 1964 if he wasn't already. "He has the knack for coming up with the big play," O'Mora said. Penn State's defense was indeed special in 1963, giving up just 92 points through 9 games and finishing the season with a record of 7–3 and a No. 16 national ranking in the coaches poll.

Ressler finished the 10 games of his junior 1963 season with 7 quarterback sacks, 3 fumble recoveries, an interception, 53 unassisted tackles, and 30 assists.

Glenn Ressler receives Maxwell Award as outstanding college football player of 1964.

Penn State head coach Rip Engle moved Ressler from guard to center on the offensive side for his 1964 senior season. He lamented to an Associated Press reporter not having two Resslers, one to play full time both sides of the ball. "We would like to use him more on offense because he's such a great blocker, but we need him full time on defense," he said.

The enthusiastic coach told another reporter of his senior two-way line star, "Ressler is big, strong, quick, a fine tackler, and what else do you need? On offense he excels at blocking the man over center and clearing the way for our inside attack. He snaps the ball well for punts and on hand-ups. Defensively he's a rugged tackler and difficult to block. Most important of all, he has the temperament to be great."

The Nittany Lions started 1964 poorly, giving up more than 20 points in each of four losses in their first five games. The team came together defensively in the second half of the season, however. A total of just 24 points were given up in the final five games, helping Penn State win out and finish the year with a winning record.

Particularly notable for the Nittany Lions in 1964 would be a 27–0 upset shutout of #2 ranked Ohio State at Columbus before a crowd of over 84,000 people. Ressler had 15 tackles in the game.

Ressler — called "Zeke" by his Penn State teammates — was chosen as winner of the Maxwell Award as college football's best all-around player of 1964. He was a "consensus All-American," although named in a variety of positions — as an offensive center to the 22-man two platoon team of the Newspaper Enterprise Association, as a guard to the 11-man single platoon first team picked by the American Football Coaches Association, and so forth. Ressler was named to various All-American teams as an offensive center and guard, and a defensive guard, tackle, and linebacker.

Ressler was also named as college football Lineman of the Year for 1964 by the Philadelphia Sportswriters' Association.

As a national star and a graduating senior, Ressler had multiple offers to appear in post-season college all-star games. He elected to play for the East in the East–West Shrine Game held in San Francisco on January 2, 1965, and in the 1965 Hula Bowl held in Honolulu one week later.

Ressler majored in Agricultural Education at Penn State, receiving his Bachelor of Science degree in 1966.

== Professional career ==
1969 newspaper photo

In a draft that saw Illinois linebacker Dick Butkus taken as the top run-stopper and Northwestern's Joe Cerne taken as the first center off the board, Glenn Ressler was selected by the Baltimore Colts in the third round with the 36th overall pick. He was estimated more highly by the rival American Football League (AFL), with the Denver Broncos taking him with the 18th overall pick in that draft.

Ressler signed with the Colts on January 10, 1965, for an amount undisclosed in the press. It was speculated that Baltimore planned to use Ressler as an offensive lineman, possibly as a guard to replace the aging Alex Sandusky.

As his professional career commenced, Ressler agreed with the prediction that he would find his place in the NFL as an offensive lineman. The taciturn Ressler told one reporter that while he preferred to play defense because defenders could use their hands, "I'll play where I think I can help the most in pro ball and I think it will be on offense."

Ressler spent his rookie year under head coach Don Shula in a reserve role, substituting at both offensive and defensive tackle. His play was sufficient for the Colts to offer a new contract for the 1966 season, which was signed April 23.

The Colts had Ressler report early with the rookies to its 1966 training camp so that head coach Don Shula could give the second year player multiple repetitions at a new NFL position, center. Shula proclaimed the experiment a success, noting that Ressler "looked good," with prospects excellent for further improvement. The team would list Ressler's position as "center-defensive tackle" on its preseason roster that year, dropping the previous year's mention of guard. Ressler had by then bulked up to 250 pounds, his playing weight for the rest of his career.

Jets DE Gerry Philbin (81) gets off a Glenn Ressler (62) block to make a tackle in Superbowl III, January 1969.

Ressler quickly gained a reputation on the Colts for being shy and soft-spoken, with one Baltimore Sun sportswriter jokingly answering the hypothetical question, "Is it true Glenn Ressler says only four words all day?" with the quip, "No, he says five." The jack-of-all-trades Ressler preferred to do his talking on the field with his hard blocking and sound tackling skills.

Ressler continued to play several positions in a reserve roll for the Colts in 1966, finally getting his first professional start in a November 20 game against the Detroit Lions at Tiger Stadium in the season's 11th week. The 23-year old Ressler made his starting debut on the offensive side of the ball, playing tackle.

Finally, ahead of the 1967 season Glenn Ressler got his opportunity to become a Colts starter on a permanent basis. Head coach Shula noted that Ressler was "ready to replace Alex Sandusky, who has retired, at guard."

Ressler would become a fixture at left guard for the Colts, starting all 14 regular season games in 1967 and in the Colts' NFL Championship year of 1968. On January 12, 1969, Ressler started at left guard for the Colts in Super Bowl III, a 16–7 loss to Joe Namath and the New York Jets.

Ressler's 1969 season was marked by a serious knee injury. He attempted to play on the hurt leg for a time, starting a total of 8 games, but was eventually forced to shut down for the last six games of the season.

In the 1970 Super Bowl season, Glenn Ressler saw action in 13 games, starting in 11. He was a starter for the team in Super Bowl V, a 16–13 win on a last second field goal by Jim O'Brien and finished the season a Super Bowl champion.

From 1971 through the end of his career in 1974, Ressler was a reliable starter at left guard for the Colts, albeit missing 5 games in 1972 due to injury.

He was traded to Washington in 1975, but retired instead of continuing to play.

== Life after football ==
While still playing for the Colts, Ressler was in the restaurant business with his father-in-law, operating Red Barn and Ponderosa Steakhouse franchises, which continued after his career ended. He was in the restaurant business for 30 years. He later worked in real estate.

Even while he was a member of the Baltimore Colts, Ressler began pursuing other occupational interests, joining the faculty of Upper Dauphin Area High School, located in rural Dauphin County, Pennsylvania, in 1967 as a vocational agriculture instructor.

He and his wife, the former Sandra Clemm, made their home in Camp Hill, Pennsylvania. She survived both a heart and kidney transplant.

Ressler was inducted into the College Football Hall of Fame in 2001.
