= Frackville, Pennsylvania =

Borough in Pennsylvania, US

Frackville
- Borough
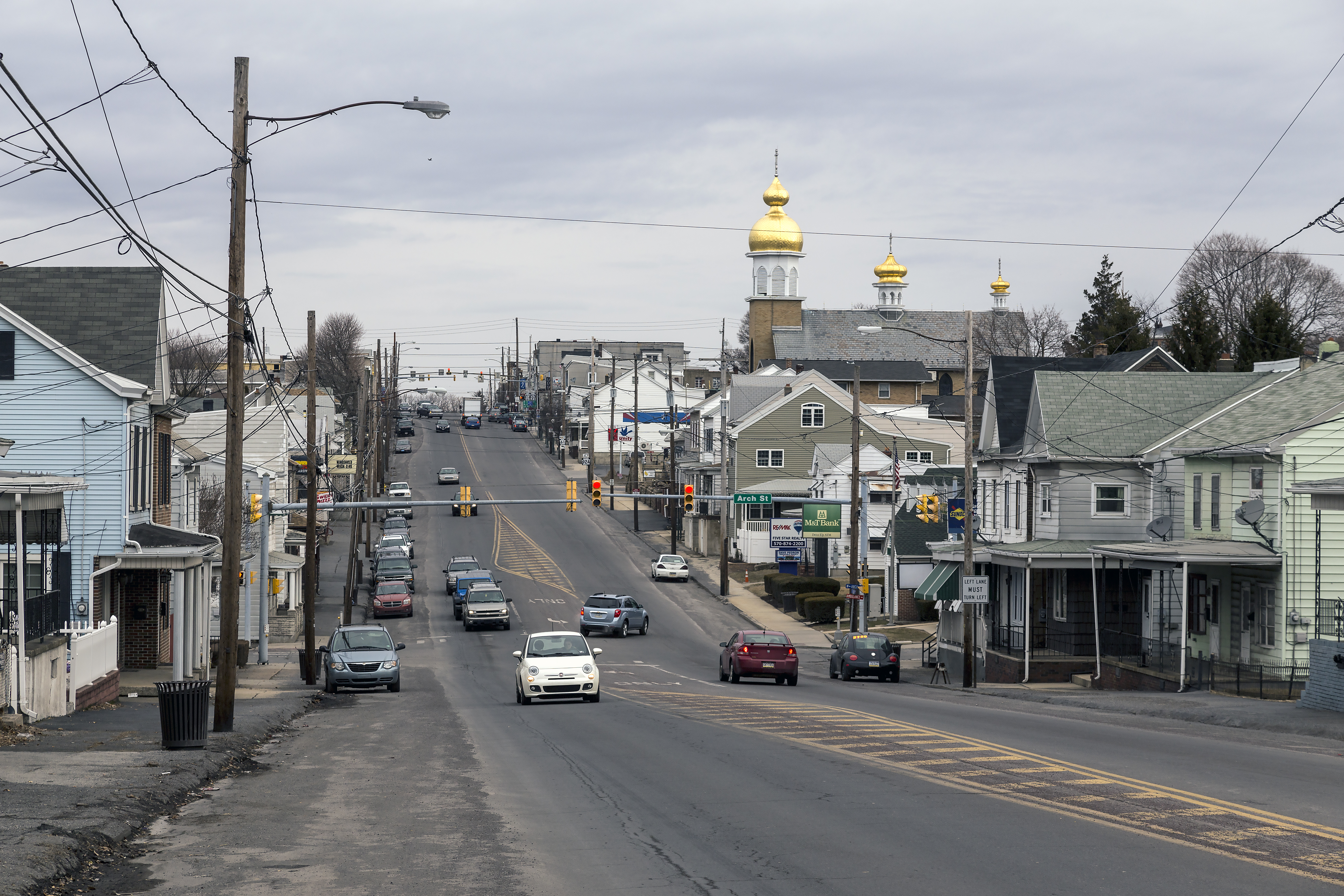
- Lehigh Avenue in Frackville in 2015
- Etymology: Daniel Frack
- Nickname: Mountain City
- Location of Frackville in Schuylkill County, Pennsylvania

- Location of Frackville in Pennsylvania Frackville (the United States)
- Coordinates: 40°47′01″N 76°14′01″W
- Country: United States
- State: Pennsylvania
- County: Schuylkill
- Settled: 1861

Government
  - Mayor: John Morgan

Area
  - Total: 0.59 sq mi (1.54 km^{2})
  - Land: 0.59 sq mi (1.54 km^{2})
  - Water: 0 sq mi (0.00 km^{2})
- Elevation: 1,470 ft (450 m)

Population (2020)
  - Total: 3,860
  - Density: 6,490.6/sq mi (2,506.05/km^{2})
- Time zone: UTC−5 (EST)
  - Summer (DST): UTC−4 (EDT)
- ZIP Code: 17931
- Area codes: 570 and 272
- FIPS code: 42-27232
- Website: www.frackvillepa.org

Frackville is a borough in Schuylkill County, Pennsylvania. As of the 2020 census, Frackville had a population of 3,860. Incorporated in 1876, Frackville is located at the intersection of Interstate 81 and Pennsylvania State Route 61, which is approximately 102 miles (164 km) northwest of Philadelphia and 60 miles (97 km) southwest of Scranton. Frackville is named for Daniel Frack, an early Anglo-American settler.

== History ==
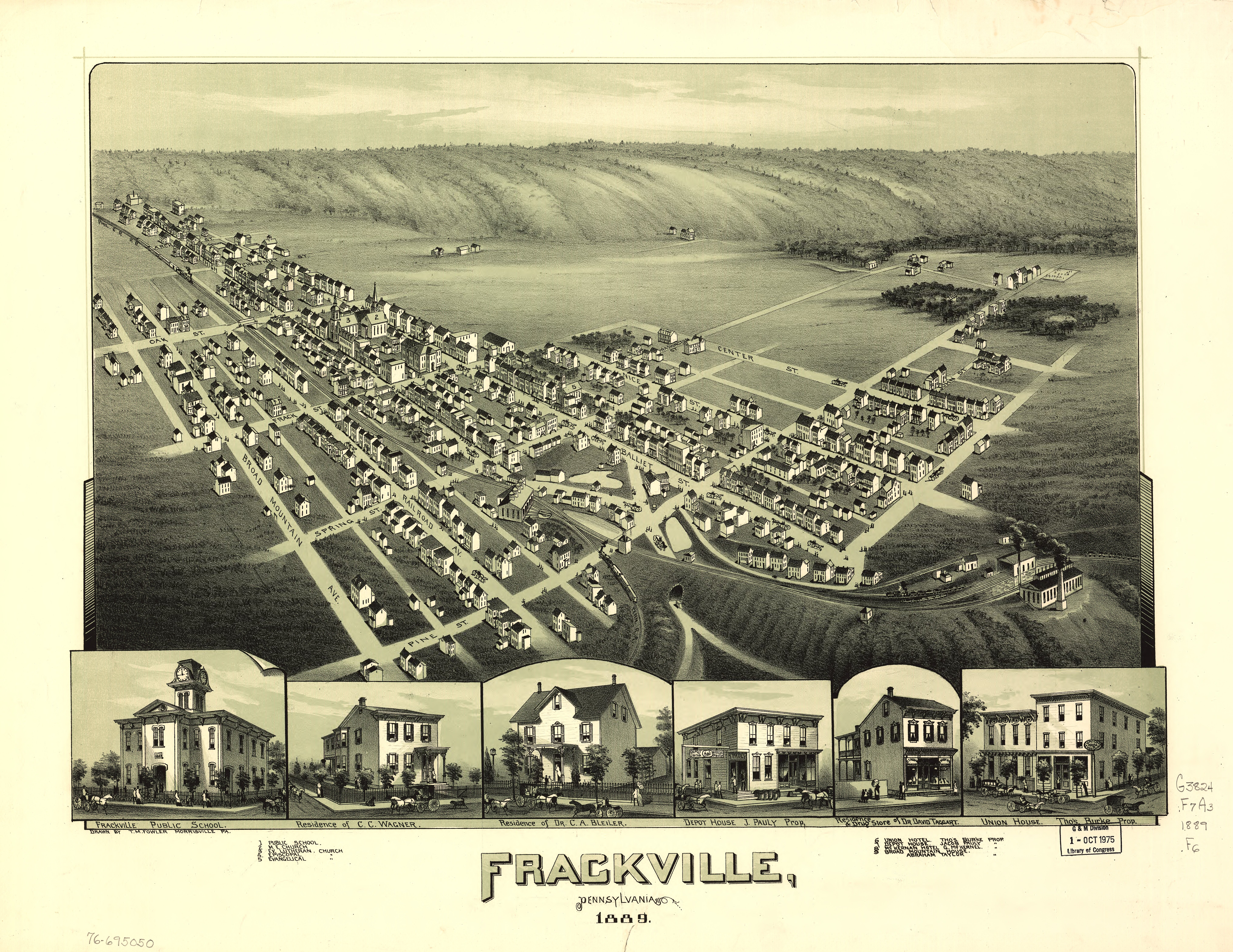
An 1889 aerial view of Frackville

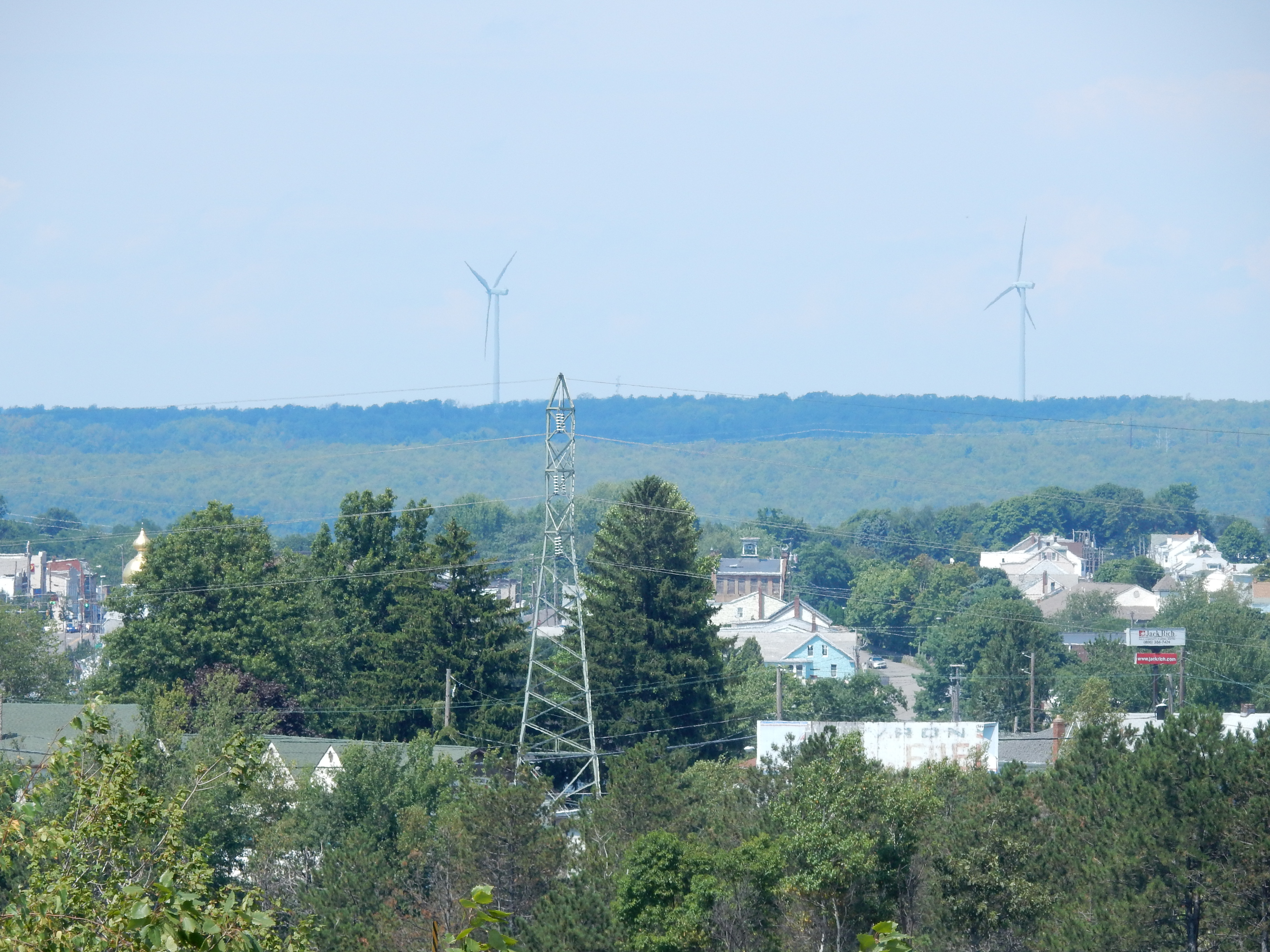
A south view on Frackville

Frackville was settled in 1861. It was incorporated more than a decade later in 1876, when the villages of Frackville and Mountain City merged to form the borough of Frackville. The name "Mountain City", however, is still a common nickname for the borough. A diner and beer distributor were both named after it.

Early in the 20th century, anthracite coal mining was the chief industry of this area, Northeastern Pennsylvania's historic Coal Region. While many mines were operated in the area, the borough developed about 4 miles south of Shenandoah as a predominantly residential community - for workers in and related to mining. With many immigrants to the borough and region, they developed businesses reflecting their cultures. In 1922, Frackville had its own independent brewery. This was short lived after Prohibition was implemented by a national constitutional amendment. (It was later repealed.)

The Mahanoy Plane, which operated from 1862 to 1931 on Broad Mountain just to the north of the borough, was able to hoist 50,000 tons of coal daily. A small coal town, also known as a "patch town", owned the name "Mahanoy Plane". It is located at the northern foot of Frackville's Broad Mountain. Railroad companies once located here transported coal from the region to markets.

Since the late 20th century, coal mining has largely ceased in the area. Industrial relics and infrastructure can be found in the thick forest north of the borough's youth baseball complex, but historical preservation or restoration has yet to take place of such structures.

Frackville celebrated its centennial in 1976, while James Nahas was mayor. The week-long event, from August 22 to 28, hosted parades each night and brought the community closer together. The borough's 125th anniversary celebration was held in 2001 and had similar events and effects. It culminated with a Frackville Cruise Night, which had car routes defined for roadways throughout the borough.

Many Frackville's residents are employed at local factories of other industries, retail outlets, and the numerous Pennsylvania State Prisons in the immediate area. More commute daily for work in the cities of Pottsville, Hazleton, Allentown, Reading, or Harrisburg.

In 1900, the population was 2,595; in 1910, 3,118; and in 1940, 8,035, its peak. With the decline in coal mining and related jobs in the region, the population has declined. It was 4,361 at the 2000 census and 3,805 in 2010.

With access via Exit 124 from Interstate 81, Frackville is a popular stop for travelers. Destinations include Dutch Kitchen, a renovated diner. The Schuylkill Mall, a former Crown American shopping mall and one of the largest in Pennsylvania, operated in the south end of the borough from 1980 to January 15, 2018. The mall was demolished and replaced by an industrial warehouse.

Frackville was home of the Schuylkill County Brew Fest from 2015 to 2018. The fest moved in 2019 to Pottsville, Pennsylvania.

== Geography ==
Frackville is located at 40°47′1″N 76°14′1″W (40.783618, -76.233662).

According to the United States Census Bureau, the borough has a total area of 0.6 square miles (1.6 km^{2}), all land. It is located on the north slope of Broad Mountain and is drained by the Mahanoy Creek into the Susquehanna River. It has a warm-summer humid continental climate (Dfb) and average monthly temperatures range from 24.8 °F in January to 70.5 °F in July. The hardiness zone is 6a.

== Police agencies ==
Frackville is served by local, state and county law enforcement agencies. It has 24/7 police coverage from the Frackville Borough Police Department. The Frackville Police Station is located in the Borough Hall Building. The Pennsylvania State Police have a barracks located at the east end of the borough (PSP Frackville Barracks). The Schuylkill County Sheriff's Department also retains jurisdiction and provides police service to Frackville.

== Demographics ==
Historical population
Census	Pop.	Note	%±
1880	1,707		—
1890	2,520		47.6%
1900	2,594		2.9%
1910	3,118		20.2%
1920	5,590		79.3%
1930	8,034		43.7%
1940	8,035		0.0%
1950	6,541		−18.6%
1960	5,654		−13.6%
1970	5,445		−3.7%
1980	5,308		−2.5%
1990	4,700		−11.5%
2000	4,361		−7.2%
2010	3,805		−12.7%
2020	3,860		1.4%
2021 (est.)	3,870	▲	0.3%

=== 2020 census ===
As of the 2020 census, Frackville had a population of 3,860. The median age was 45.8 years. 19.7% of residents were under the age of 18 and 22.6% of residents were 65 years of age or older. For every 100 females there were 95.6 males, and for every 100 females age 18 and over there were 92.7 males age 18 and over.

100.0% of residents lived in urban areas, while 0.0% lived in rural areas.

There were 1,678 households in Frackville, of which 24.9% had children under the age of 18 living in them. Of all households, 39.5% were married-couple households, 21.0% were households with a male householder and no spouse or partner present, and 31.3% were households with a female householder and no spouse or partner present. About 34.4% of all households were made up of individuals and 17.7% had someone living alone who was 65 years of age or older.

There were 1,928 housing units, of which 13.0% were vacant. The homeowner vacancy rate was 2.8% and the rental vacancy rate was 9.0%.

Racial composition as of the 2020 census
Race	Number	Percent
White	3,580	92.7%
Black or African American	49	1.3%
American Indian and Alaska Native	10	0.3%
Asian	40	1.0%
Native Hawaiian and Other Pacific Islander	0	0.0%
Some other race	61	1.6%
Two or more races	120	3.1%
Hispanic or Latino (of any race)	162	4.2%

=== 2000 census ===
As of the 2000 census, there were 4,361 people, 1,914 households, and 1,169 families residing in the borough. The population density was 7,309.8 inhabitants per square mile (2,822.3/km^{2}). There were 2,094 housing units at an average density of 3,509.9 per square mile (1,355.2/km^{2}). The racial makeup of the borough was 98.14% White, 1.05% Asian, 0.37% African American, 0.07% Native American, 0.25% from other races, and 0.11% from two or more races. Hispanic or Latino of any race were 0.71% of the population.

There were 1,914 households, out of which 24.7% had children under the age of 18 living with them, 45.9% were married couples living together, 10.6% had a female householder with no husband present, and 38.9% were non-families. 36.2% of all households were made up of individuals, and 20.4% had someone living alone who was 65 years of age or older. The average household size was 2.22 and the average family size was 2.88.

In the borough the population was spread out, with 19.7% under the age of 18, 6.6% from 18 to 24, 25.4% from 25 to 44, 22.5% from 45 to 64, and 25.8% who were 65 years of age or older. The median age was 44 years. For every 100 females, there were 88.5 males. For every 100 females age 18 and over, there were 82.3 males.

=== Income and poverty ===
The median income for a household in the borough was $32,071, and the median income for a family was $47,553. Males had a median income of $31,412 versus $21,836 for females. The per capita income for the borough was $18,587. About 2.7% of families and 7.4% of the population were below the poverty line, including 4.6% of those under age 18 and 12.6% of those age 65 or over.

=== Demographic estimates ===
The most common ancestries claimed by residents of Frackville are Polish (19.8%), Italian (17.2%), German (11.1%), Lithuanian (7.8%), and Ukrainian (5.6%), reflecting late 19th and early 20th-century immigration to the area.

== Transportation ==
Schuylkill Transportation System operates the #10, and 51 bus to/from Pottsville and the #52 bus to/from Ashland

There is a route in the Uptown Vans network which connects Frackville to Paterson, New Jersey and New York City.

== Education ==
The school district is North Schuylkill School District.
