= Mahanoy Creek =

Creek in Pennsylvania

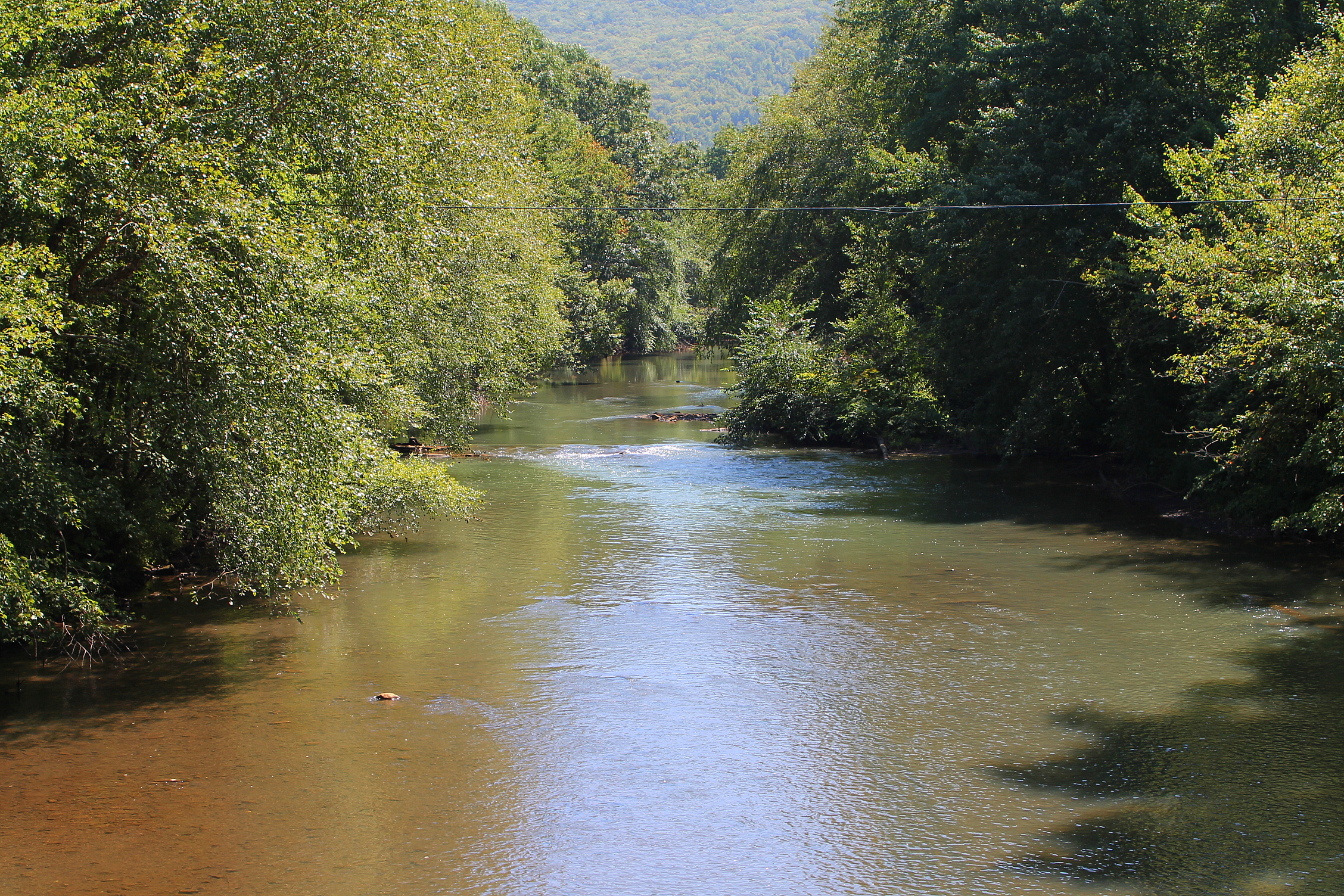
- Mahanoy Creek in Little Mahanoy Township, Northumberland County

Location
- Country: United States
- State: Pennsylvania
- Counties: Northumberland and Schuylkill

Physical characteristics
- Source
  - location: Mahanoy Township, Pennsylvania
- Mouth
  - location: Susquehanna River in Jackson Township, Northumberland County, Pennsylvania
  - coordinates: 40°43′22″N 76°50′37″W
- Length: 51.6 mi (83.0 km)
- Basin size: 157 mi^{2} (410 km^{2})
- Discharge
  - average: Up to 320 cubic feet per second (9.1 m^{3}/s)

Basin features
- Progression: Susquehanna River, Chesapeake Bay
- Tributaries
  - left: Little Mahanoy Creek, Crab Run, Schwaben Creek
  - right: North Mahanoy Creek, Shenandoah Creek, Zerbe Run

Mahanoy Creek is a 51.6-mile-long (83.0 km) tributary of the Susquehanna River in Northumberland and Schuylkill counties, Pennsylvania. There are at least 35 sources of acid mine drainage in the creek's watershed. Anthracite was mined in the upper part of the Mahanoy Creek watershed in the 19th and 20th centuries. Mahanoy Creek's tributaries include Schwaben Creek, Zerbe Run, Little Mahanoy Creek, Shenandoah Creek, and North Mahanoy Creek. Little Mahanoy Creek and Schwaben Creek are two streams in the watershed that are unaffected by acid mine drainage. Schwaben Creek has a higher number and diversity of fish species than the main stem.

There are two passive treatment systems in the Mahanoy Creek watershed by the Mahanoy Creek Watershed Association. Coal mining has been done in the watershed since the 19th century and continues to some extent in the 21st century. The watershed is in the Western Middle Anthracite Coal Field.

== Course ==
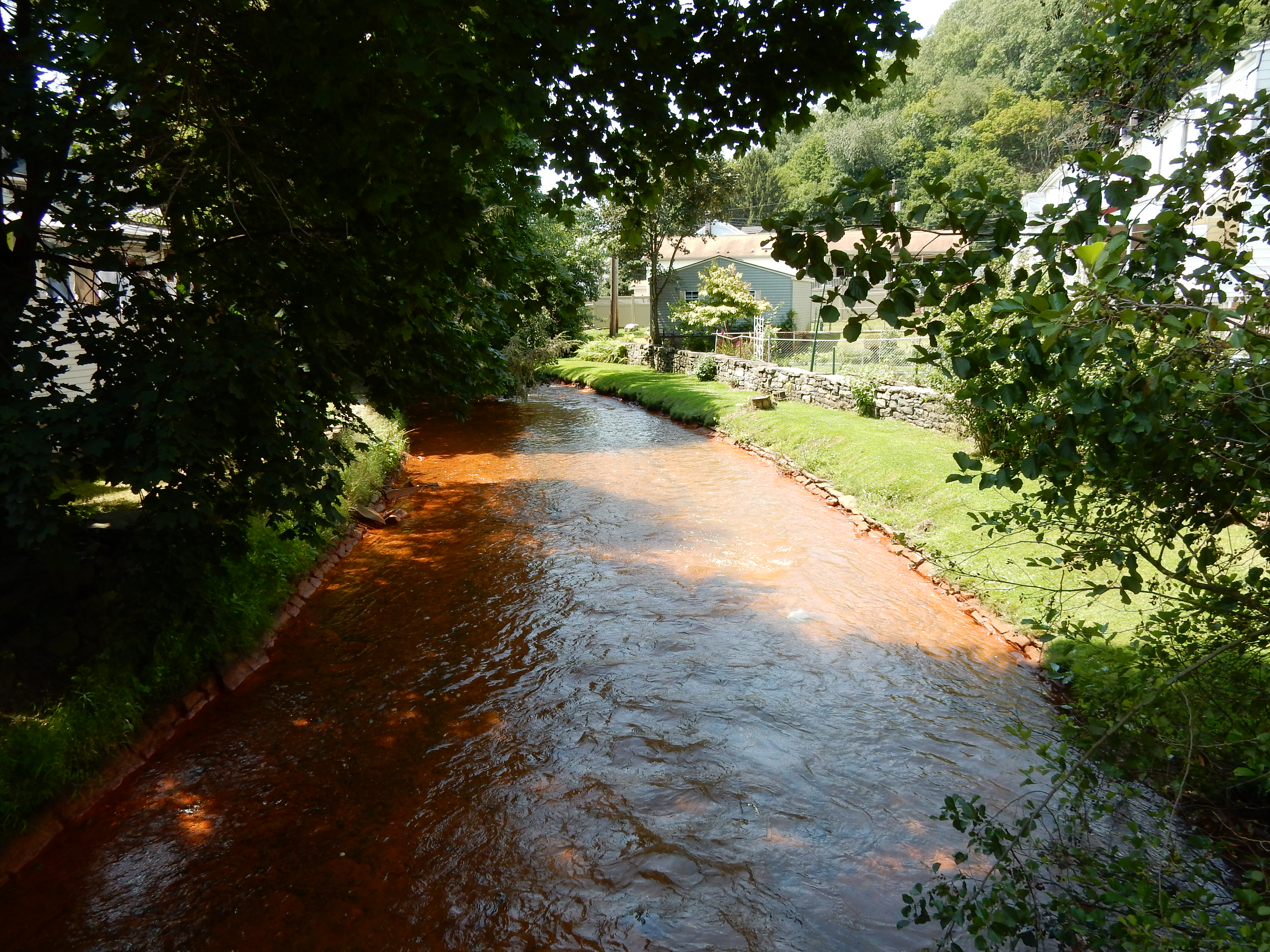
Mahanoy Creek in Girardville

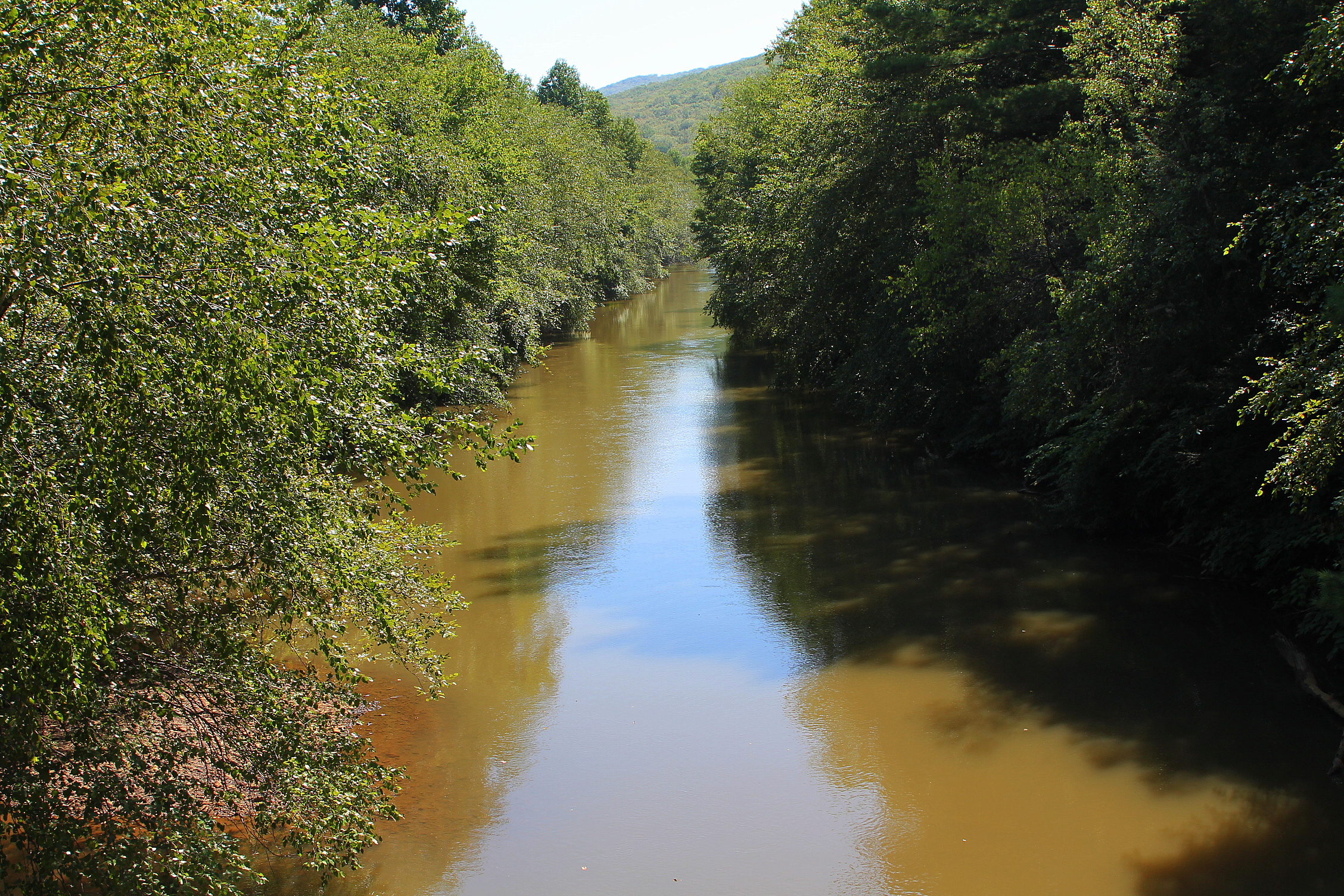
Mahanoy Creek in East Cameron Township, Northumberland County

Mahanoy Creek's source is in strip mines in the eastern part of Schuylkill County, near Buck Mountain. It heads west for a short distance before crossing under Pennsylvania Route 54 and entering Mahanoy City, where it picks up the tributary North Mahanoy Creek. Mahanoy Creek continues westward, heading into Mahanoy Township again, and goes through more strip mines. It begins paralleling Bear Ridge for several miles, passing the communities of St. Nicholas and Boston Run before entering Gilberton. In Gilberton, the creek passes under Pennsylvania Route 924 and goes through by the former Mahanoy Plane. Upon leaving Mahanoy Township, the creek enters Butler Township. Soon after entering this township, the creek passes through Girardville, picking up Shenandoah Creek. It parallels Pennsylvania Route 54 for some distance into Ashland. Upon leaving Ashland, the creek stops paralleling Pennsylvania Route 54 and turns south through a gap in Ashland Mountain, leaving behind the strip mines. At Gordon, it picks up Little Mahanoy Creek and then turns west again, meandering out of Butler Township. The creek then briefly meanders through Barry Township before passing into Eldred Township. It flows on the northern side of a mountain in Weiser State Forest. Upon leaving Eldred Township, the creek enters Northumberland County.

Mahanoy Creek enters Northumberland County in East Cameron Township. It flows westward for a number of miles through a valley with Line Mountain to the south and Mahanoy Mountain to the north. The creek passes under Pennsylvania Route 125 in this valley. The creek passes into West Cameron Township, flowing west and goes through the township for several miles. It then flows into Little Mahanoy Township. After a short distance, it leaves behind the Line Mountain/Mahanoy Mountain valley and picks up Zerbe Run. Mahanoy Creek then turns southwest and passes by Dornsife before cutting through a gap between Little Mountain and Line Mountain and exiting Little Mahanoy Township. At this point, the creek enters Jackson Township and picks up Schwaben Creek, its last tributary, after some distance. Mahanoy Creek then meanders west to its mouth on the Susquehanna River north of Herndon and ten miles south of Sunbury.

=== Tributaries ===
Mahanoy Creek's tributaries include Little Mahanoy Creek, Schwaben Creek, Shenandoah Creek, Waste House Run, North Mahanoy Creek, and Zerbe Run. There are also several unofficially named tributaries with local names, such as "Big Run" and "Big Mine Run". Only Schwaben Creek and Little Mahanoy Creek are unaffected by acid mine drainage.

North Mahanoy Creek starts in unpolluted springs on Locust Mountain and meets the main stem in Mahanoy City. There are strip mines in this tributary's watershed. Shenandoah Creek, whose tributaries include Kehley Run and Lost Creek, also begins on Locust Mountain and its watershed has an area of 11.6 square miles. Shenandoah Creek is contaminated by sewage and mine drainage. The tributary Little Mahanoy Creek starts in Frackville and its watershed has an area of 11.6 square miles. No mining has been done in this watershed.

== Hydrology ==
There are large quantities of dissolved iron and aluminum in the waters of Mahanoy Creek. Additionally, there are trace amounts of various metals, including cobalt, nickel, copper, zinc, lead, sulfates, manganese, and beryllium. There are traces of numerous other metals in the waters, but their concentrations conform to drinking water standards.

Out of the 35 or more acid mine drainage sources in the Mahanoy Creek watershed, the four most significant ones are the Locust Gap Tunnel, the Packer #5 Breach, the Packer #5 Borehole, and the Girard Mine seepage. The 15 most significant sources have discharges of between 29,200 liters per minute and 680 liters per minute. The pHs of the sources range from 3.9 to 6.7. The iron concentrations at these sites ranges from 2.1 to 18 milligrams per liter. The concentrations of manganese ranges from 0.95 to 6.4 milligrams per liter.

The pH of the stream itself ranges from 3.6 to 8.4, while the pH of the abandoned mine drainage ranges from 2.9 to 7.4. The concentration of dissolved oxygen in Mahanoy Creek ranges from 2.5 to 13.1 milligrams per liter, while the concentration in the watershed's abandoned mine drainage ranges from 0.1 to 9.7 milligrams per liter. The dissolved iron concentration in the stream ranges from under 0.01 milligrams per liter to 6.8 milligrams per liter. The dissolved iron concentration in the abandoned mine drainage ranges from 0.01 to 33 milligrams per liter. The amount of dissolved aluminum in the creek ranges from 0.01 to 8.9 milligrams per liter and the concentration in the abandoned mine drainage ranges from under 0.01 to 17 milligrams per liter. The dissolved manganese concentration in the stream water ranges from 0.01 to 9.2 milligrams per liter and in the abandoned mine drainage it ranges from under 0.01 to 9.7 milligrams per liter.

The concentration of dissolved sulfates in the waters of Mahanoy Creek ranges from 4 to 597 milligrams per liter. In the abandoned mine drainage in the creek's watershed, it ranges from 18 to 787 milligrams per liter. The dissolved nitrates concentration in the stream waters ranges from less than 0.01 to 6 milligrams per liter. The concentration in the abandoned mine drainage ranges from less than 0.01 to 0.4 milligrams per liter. In the stream water, the concentration of dissolved phosphorus ranges from less than 0.01 to 0.3 milligrams per liter. In the abandoned mine drainage, the range is 0 to 139 milligrams per liter.

The concentration of arsenic is above 0.2 micrograms per liter at most sites in the Mahanoy Creek watershed. The maximum concentration is 7 micrograms per liter. The concentration of barium is above 10 micrograms per liter at all sites in the watershed, and the maximum concentration is 75 micrograms per liter. The beryllium concentration is above 0.05 micrograms per liter at most sites in the watershed, and in some places is as high as 16 micrograms per liter. The cadmium concentration is above 0.02 micrograms per liter in most sites and can be up to 4 micrograms per liter. The maximum chromium concentration is 9 micrograms per liter. Most sites have a concentration of at least 0.02 micrograms per liter of cobalt, with a maximum concentration of 530 micrograms per liter. Most sites have a concentration of at least 0.5 micrograms per liter of copper, with a maximum concentration of 150 micrograms per liter. The lead concentration is above 0.05 micrograms per liter in most sites and can be up to 6.4 micrograms per liter.

The maximum nickel concentration in Mahanoy Creek is 895 micrograms per liter and the maximum silver concentration is 0.9 micrograms per liter. The concentration of thallium does not exceed 0.02 micrograms per liter and the concentration of vanadium does not exceed 1 microgram per liter. The maximum concentration of zinc is 3.2 milligrams per liter.

Some water from the Shamokin Creek watershed enters the Mahanoy Creek watershed via various mine tunnels, mainly the Doutyville, Helfenstein, the Locust Gap, and the Centralia Mine discharges. Water from Mahanoy Creek also flows through mine tunnels into Shamokin Creek. The discharge of the creek at various locations ranges from 0 to 320 cubic feet per second. The discharge of acid mine drainage in the creek ranges from 0 to 17.2 cubic feet per second. In 2001, the discharge was typically found to be higher in March than in August.

While there are sewage-treatment plants in the larger communities in the Mahanoy Creek watershed, there are also leaky sewage disposal systems that discharge sewage into the stream's tributaries. The creek experiences atmospheric disposition, a type of runoff.

== Geology and geography ==
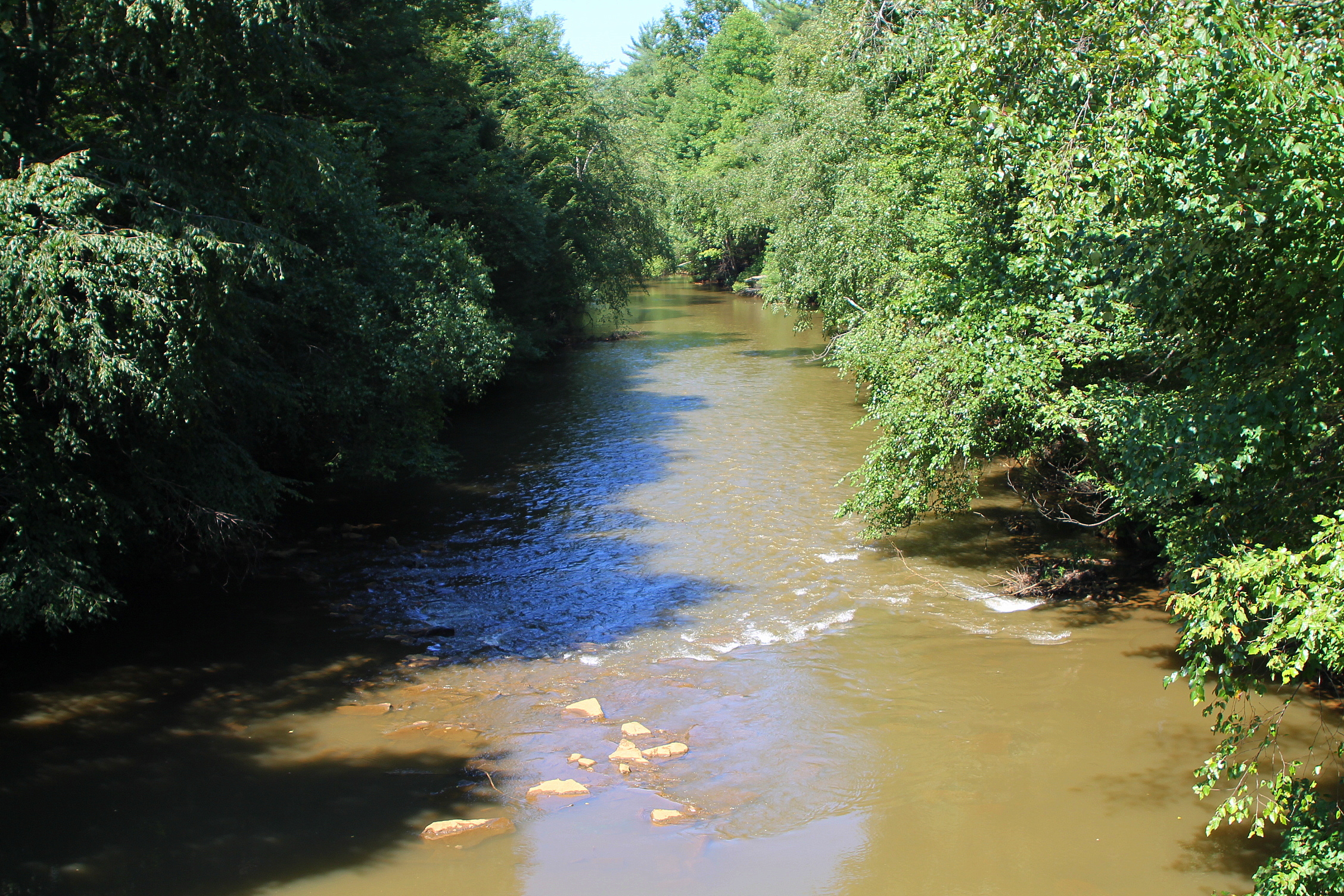
Mahanoy Creek in East Cameron Township

The watershed of Mahanoy Creek is in the Ridge and Valley Appalachians. The lower part of the creek's watershed is in the Northern Shale Valleys and Slopes Ecoregion. The Mahanoy Creek watershed is part of a synclinorium that runs from the northeast to the southwest, running between Hunter and Shenandoah. Rock formations in the watershed include the Pottsville Group and the Llewellyn Formation. These are found on the northern side of the creek's valley.

There are 24 coal beds from the Pennsylvanian subperiod, which are part of the Llewellyn Formation and the Pottsville Formation. The coal beds are 0.6 to 8.3 feet (0.18 to 2.53 m) thick. Mining of these coal beds has been done at depths of over 2,500 feet (760 m) underground. There are significant silt deposits on the creek downstream of Ashland. In the watershed, there are a number of close-to-parallel ridges and valleys. These tend to be oriented in the same direction as the creek itself, east to west. The highest elevation in the Mahanoy Creek watershed is 2,090 feet (640 m) above sea level in the eastern part of the watershed, not far from Delano. The lowest elevation in the watershed is 420 feet (130 m) at the mouth. The elevations of the ridges tend to be between 1,400 and 1,800 feet (430 and 550 m) above sea level, while the valleys are between 600 and 800 feet (180 and 240 m) lower.

The stream bed of Mahanoy Creek has an iron crust near Girardville, but some fish live in that area.

Minerals in the acid mine drainage areas of the Mahanoy Creek watershed include goethite, ferrihydrite, schwertmannite, amorphous aluminum-hydroxysulfates, quartz, muscovite, kaolinite, and gypsum. Red shale of the Mauch Chunk Formation is found in a substantial part of the watershed. The main rock types in the watershed are interbedded sedimentary rock, which occupies 70 percent of the watershed, and sandstone, which occupies 30 percent.

A number of seeps, boreholes, and mine tunnels contribute water to Mahanoy Creek throughout large sections of the watershed. Mined areas in the upper part of the watershed have been said to "resemble a moonscape". There are numerous large spoil piles in the upper one-third of the watershed. Some buildings the Mahanoy Creek valley are damaged by subsidence due to underground mining.

== Watershed ==
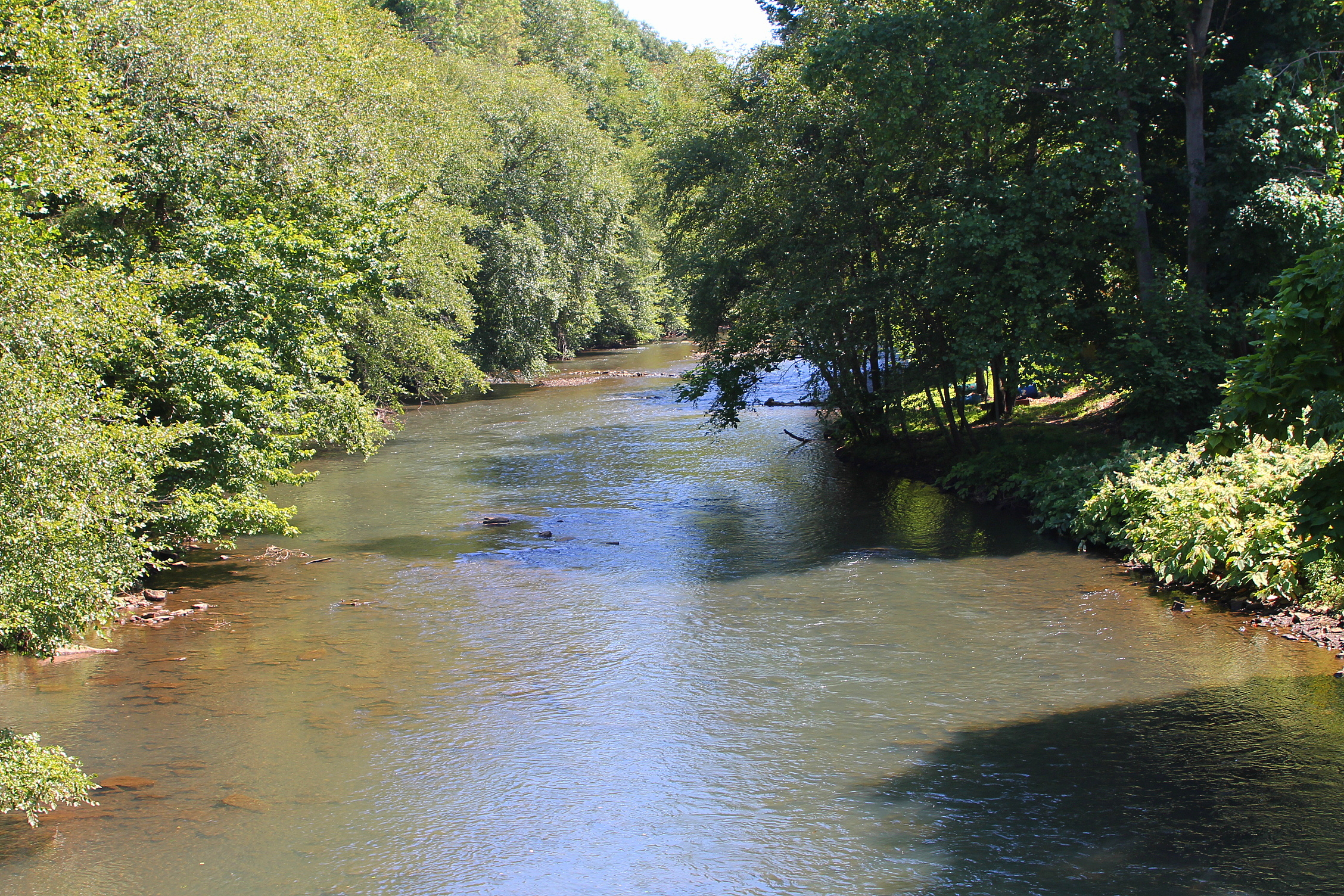
Mahanoy Creek near the Dornsife Gap

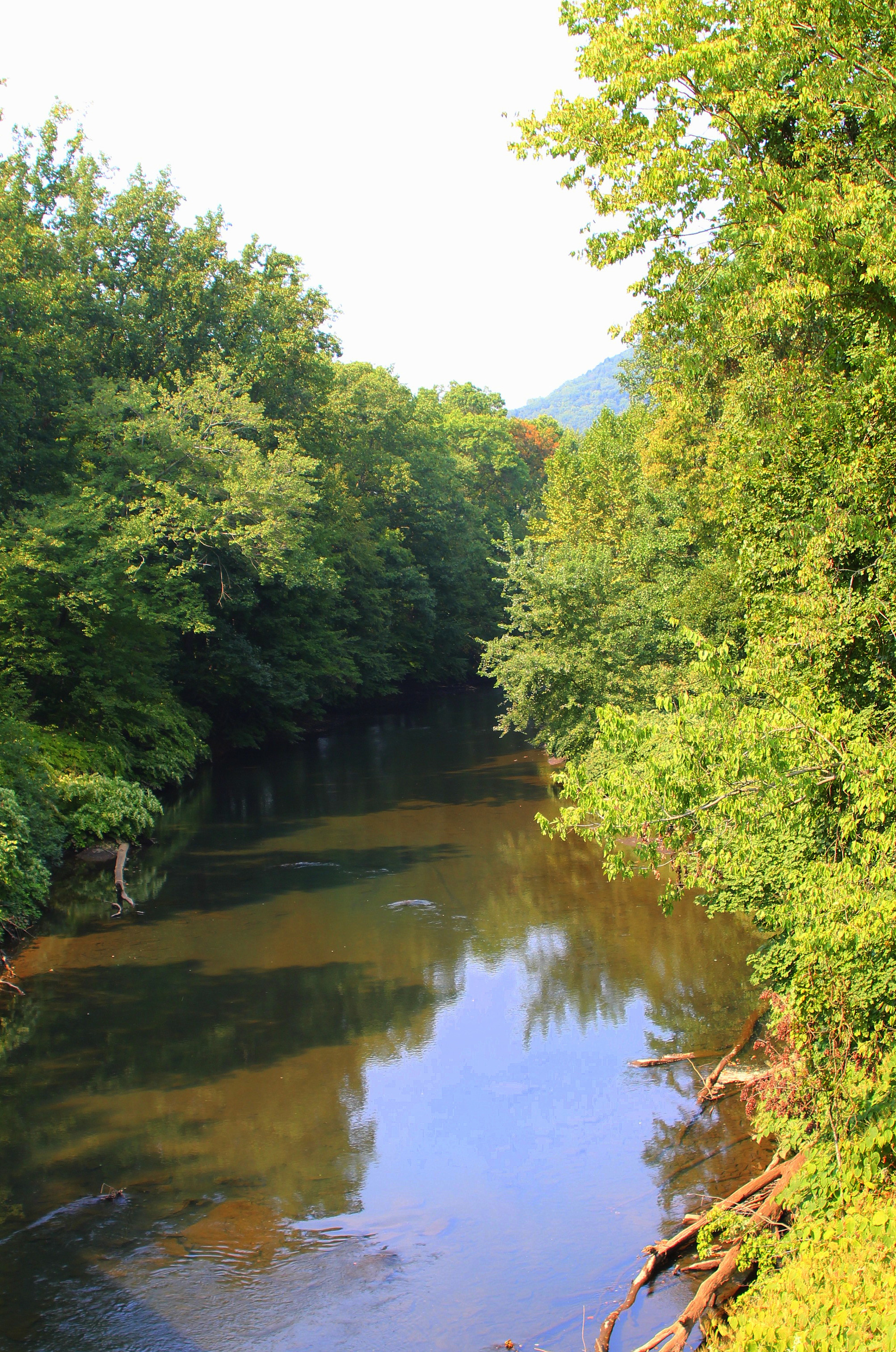
Mahanoy Creek looking upstream near its mouth, from Pennsylvania Route 147

The area of Mahanoy Creek's watershed is 157 square miles (410 square kilometers). The watershed is in Schuylkill, Northumberland, and Columbia County. 42 square miles (110 square kilometers) are located in the Western Middle Anthracite Field. There are at least 35 sources of acid mine drainage in the watershed. The watershed has a population of close to 45,000 people as of July 2009. A tract of land in the Mahanoy Creek watershed has been converted by the Mahanoy Creek Watershed Association into a wetland known as "The Swamp". It serves as a passive treatment system. This organization has also performed cleanups of the creek at Ashland, Girardville, and Helfenstein. The main stem of the creek is divided into several basins. One basin is the Upper Basin, which is drained by Mahanoy Creek and its tributaries upstream of Shenandoah Creek. It has an area of 21.8 square miles. Another basin is the Ashland Basin, which is drained by Mahanoy Creek and its tributaries between Shenandoah Creek and Big Run, not including the Little Mahanoy Creek watershed. The Ashland basin has an area of 17.7 square miles. The next basin downstream is the Middle Basin, which drains the area where the creek flows between Mahanoy Mountain and Line Mountain, ending at Zerbe Run. This basin has an area of 38.7 square miles. The final basin of Mahanoy Creek is the Lower Basin, which is drained by Mahanoy Creek downstream of Zerbe Run. This basin has an area of 42.7 square miles.

The Mahanoy Creek watershed is 66 percent forested land, 21 percent agricultural land, 9 percent barren mined land, and 4 percent developed land. However, the upper part of Mahanoy Creek is 50 percent forested land, 44 percent mined land, 5 percent developed land, and less than 1 percent agricultural land. There are six boroughs in the upper part of the watershed. There are a total of 28 municipalities in the watershed.

The eastern edge of the Mahanoy Creek watershed is marked by Locust Mountain and Vulcan Hill. The southern edge is formed by Broad Mountain, Fisher Ridge, and Line Mountain. The northern edge is formed by Little Mountain, Locust Mountain, and Mahanoy Mountain. The drainage system of the watershed is a trellis pattern, a dendritic pattern, or an angular drainage pattern.

The streams in the Mahanoy Creek watershed tend to meander relatively little, but the main creek meanders somewhat between Gordon and Lavelle and near its mouth.

Mahanoy Creek's headwaters are close to the edge of the Susquehanna River watershed, near the Schuylkill River watershed.

== History ==
=== Early history and naming ===
Mahanoy Creek's name comes from a corruption of the Delaware Indian word mahoni or maghonioy. The former word means "lick". The area was owned by the Iroquois before European settlers arrived. The community of Mahanoy City is named after Mahanoy Creek.

=== Modern history ===
Nathan Beach and several other people filed an application for 34 lots at the headwaters of Mahanoy Creek in 1794.

The Danville and Pottsville Railroad had a terminus in Girardville, a community of Mahanoy Creek, by 1834. The Mahanoy Creek Navigation Company formed on March 22, 1827. The Mahanoy Creek Canal ran from the Susquehanna River to the coal mines in the upper part of Mahanoy Creek. A canal running from Chester County and Lancaster County to Pittsburgh with a course going through Mahanoy Creek was planned by 1832.

In the late 19th century, a company piped waste from the production of illuminating gas (for gas lighting) into Mahanoy Creek. In Gilberton, Mahanoy Creek used to be underground, but surfaced before 1940.

Anthracite was mined in the upper part of the Mahanoy Creek watershed from 1840 until 1950. However, farming was also done in the western part of the watershed in the early 20th century. Most of the deep mines ceased operation by 1960. Surface mines instead continued mining operations in the watershed. A total of 12 million short tons of anthracite were mined in the creek's watershed in 1917. This was 12% of the anthracite yield of the state of Pennsylvania in that year. In the 1910s, there were 40 washeries and collieries that drained into the creek. Large amounts of culm also flowed into it during this time. The layer of coal silt on the banks of the creek was 40 feet (12 m) by 1940. Several mines remain active in the 21st century, but they mostly reprocess coal waste.

At least one covered bridge crosses Mahanoy Creek. It is called the Mahanoy Creek Bridge. It was built in 1940 in Northumberland County and is 152.9 feet (46.6 m) in length. Two passive treatment systems have been installed in the creek's watershed by the Mahanoy Creek Watershed Association. They are the Mahanoy Creek Aerobic Wetlands, which were created in 2000; and the Bolich Property Wetlands, which were created in 2006.

== Biology ==
In the fall of 2000, twelve species of fish were observed during electrofishing. They included eastern blacknose dace, northern hognosed suckers, shiners, smallmouth bass, and rock bass.

An October 2001 survey of Mahanoy Creek identified two species of fish each at Ashland and Girardville. There were 20 individuals at the latter location and 22 at the former. There were also 13 species and 134 individuals at Gowen City, and 14 species and 545 individuals at the creek's mouth. Additionally, 1003 individuals and 20 species of fish were observed at the mouth of the tributary Schwaben Creek. White Suckers were found at each of the aforementioned sites. Other fish species found on Mahanoy Creek and Schwaben Creek include the swallowtail shiner, the rosyface shiner, the river chub, the banded darter, and the shield darter. Brown trout, longnose dace, and eastern blacknose dace have also been observed in the watershed. Historically, deer came to the creek to consume salt.

There are second-growth forests near Kehly Run, a tributary of Mahanoy Creek.

== Recreation ==
The Pennsylvania State Game Land Number 84 is located immediately south of Mahanoy Creek between Helfenstein and Dornsife. The Sen. James J. Rhoades Nature Trail is a walking trail along the creek in Barry Township. It was dedicated to James J. Rhoades on May 8, 2010. Catch and release fishing of smallmouth bass and largemouth bass is permitted on the creek.

== See also ==
- Fidlers Run, next tributary of the Susquehanna River going downriver
- Penns Creek, next tributary of the Susquehanna River going upriver
- List of rivers of Pennsylvania
- List of tributaries of Mahanoy Creek
