= Leck Kill, Pennsylvania =

Unincorporated community in Pennsylvania, US

- Unincorporated community
- Location within Pennsylvania
- Coordinates: 40°43′00″N 76°37′48″W
- Country: United States
- State: Pennsylvania
- County: Northumberland
- Elevation: 768 ft (234 m)
- Time zone: UTC-5 (Eastern (EST))
  - Summer (DST): UTC-4 (EDT)
- ZIP code: 17836
- Area codes: 272 & 570
- GNIS feature ID: 1203999

Leck Kill is an unincorporated community in Northumberland County, Pennsylvania, United States. The community is 6.4 miles (10.3 km) southwest of Shamokin.

It had a post office from January 30, 1872, until January 3, 2004, and still has its own ZIP Code, 17836.

== History ==
In 1891, S. S. Hetrick bought Leck Kill's store, which had previously been known as "the old Beisels stand," with plans to operate the business as both a store and hotel.

In 1898, the community's public schools were part of the Upper Mahanoy School District. On January 18 of that year, the district hosted a professional development program for area educators. Topics addressed included: "How to Keep Small Pupils Busy," What to Teach the Third Reader Pupils," "Duties and Responsibilities of the Teacher," and "Learning by Observation."

On Sunday, June 22, 1914, St. John's Lutheran and Reformed Church in Leck Kill was rededicated during a ceremony attended by several hundred members of the church and local residents. The congregation had recently completed a fundraising campaign, which brought in more than $2,000, and was used to pay off the church's debts. The Rev. C. E. Baer of Millersburg and the Rev. C. B. Schneider of Shamokin were the primary speakers at the event.

Throughout the 1920s, agriculture continued to be one of the community's most important industries. By 1924, its farmers were considered leaders within the Commonwealth of Pennsylvania for their use of high-pressure, power-spray machines to apply Bordeaux to fruit trees and potato crops in order to control the spread of insects and plant diseases and increase the quality and amount of crops sent to market. On March 11 and 12, 1929, the Green Brier Grange hosted a series of educational lectures for Northumberland County farmers at Reitz Hall in Leck Kill. Topics included: "Dairy Cattle Feeding and Management," "Fertilizers and Soil Fertility," and "Insect Control."

== Education ==
On Monday, August 15, 1932, the Leck Kill schools became the first schools in the county to open their doors for the new academic year. Throughout that decade and the next, the school district sponsored an annual agricultural and home economics fair, which attracted large crowds interested in viewing the hundreds of displays presented by students each year. The district was also known for its debate education programs. Its two high school debate teams won Pennsylvania's northeastern regional debate championship and advanced to the state finals in April 1940, after also winning the Northumberland County debate championship for the fourth straight year earlier that same month.

Leck Kill had an elementary school until 2013, when the Line Mountain School District closed the school and sent students elsewhere in the district. Its former school building opened in 1927. The community was home to a tavern and a mill in the nineteenth century.

== Notable residents ==
- Glenn Ressler (b. 1943), member of the College Football Hall of Fame and 10 year player for the Baltimore Colts of the National Football League (NFL)
