= List of Pennsylvania state historical markers in Schuylkill County =

Location of Schuylkill County in Pennsylvania

This is a list of the Pennsylvania state historical markers in Schuylkill County.

This is intended to be a complete list of the official state historical markers placed in Schuylkill County, Pennsylvania by the Pennsylvania Historical and Museum Commission (PHMC). The locations of the historical markers, as well as the latitude and longitude coordinates as provided by the PHMC's database, are included below when available. There are 28 historical markers located in Schuylkill County.

== Historical markers ==
Marker title	Image	Date dedicated	Location	Marker type	Topics
1902 Anthracite Coal Strike		October 25, 2002	Centre and Union Sts., Shenandoah; 40.82129°N 76.19591°W	Roadside	Business & Industry, Coal, Government & Politics 19th Century, Labor
Allan P. Jaffe (1935 - 1987)		May 11, 2024	316 N Centre Street, Pottsville, PA 17901 40.687479°N 76.196856°W	City	Artists, Music & Theater, Performers
Ashland Boys' Association (A.B.A.)		August 31, 2013	Mothers' Memorial and Welcome Home Plaza, North Hoffman Blvd., Ashland; 40.78368°N 76.33721°W	Roadside	Coal, Ethnic & Immigration, Labor
Birth of Cable Television		n/a	1501 E. Centre St., Mahanoy City; 40.81606°N 76.12496°W	Roadside	Business & Industry, Invention, Motion Pictures & Television
Burd Patterson		October 5, 1996	803 Mahantongo St., Pottsville; 40.68149°N 76.20044°W	City	Business & Industry, Coal, Iron, Professions & Vocations
Conrad Richter		December 8, 1994	11 Maple St., Pine Grove; 40.54564°N 76.38415°W	City	Writers
Dorsey Brothers, The		September 7, 1991	5 N. Main St. (PA 924) near Center St., Shenandoah; 40.82067°N 76.2011°W	Roadside	Performers
Muhammad Ali Training Camp		June 3, 2023	8 Sculps Hill Road, Orwigsburg 40.638368°N 76.094913°W	Roadside	Sports & Recreation, African American
Firth Dock (1828-1871)		October 23, 1999	Rte. 209 between Pottsville and Port Carbon; 40.69055°N 76.1714°W	Roadside	Business & Industry, Canals, Coal, Navigation
Fort Franklin		March 16, 1955	Pa. 309 SE of Snyders; 40.71459°N 75.84225°W	Roadside	Forts, French & Indian War, Military, Native American
Fort Lebanon		February 20, 1949	Pa. 895 at North St., NE of Auburn; 40.60295°N 76.08829°W	Roadside	Forts, French & Indian War, Military, Native American
John O'Hara		June 19, 1982	606 Mahantongo St., Pottsville; 40.68195°N 76.19796°W	City	Writers
John Siney (1831-1880)		September 1, 2003	Claude A Lord Blvd. (Rt. 61) between Russell & Hancock Sts., St. Clair; 40.71865°N 76.19204°W	Roadside	Business & Industry, Coal, Government & Politics 19th Century, Labor
Les Brown		March 14, 2006	1944 E Grand Ave. (PA 209), @ S Terry St. intersection, Reinerton	City	Music & Theater, Performers
Little Lithuania, USA		August 10, 2013	5 N. Main St. (PA 924) near Center St., Shenandoah; 40.82067°N 76.2011°W	Roadside	Coal, Ethnic & Immigration, Religion
Mahanoy Plane		September 8, 2007	Rt. 924, northern end of Frackville; 40.7892°N 76.2328°W	Roadside	Business & Industry, Coal, Railroads, Transportation
Mary Harris "Mother" Jones		October 25, 2002	Rte. 209 & 1st Street, Coaldale; 40.8271°N 75.90385°W	Roadside	Coal, Labor, Women
Molly Maguire Executions		September 9, 2006	at Schuylkill County Prison, Sanderson St., Pottsville	Roadside	Business & Industry, Coal, Government & Politics 19th Century, Labor
Pottsville Maroons		November 10, 1999	N Center St. between Arch and Race Sts., Pottsville; 40.68701°N 76.19659°W	Roadside	Football, Sports
Schuylkill Canal		September 4, 1994	Pine & Pike St. at veterans park, Port Carbon; 40.69531°N 76.16655°W	City	Canals, Navigation, Transportation
Schuylkill County		May 26, 1982	SE corner, Laurel Blvd. & N 2nd St., Pottsville; 40.68758°N 76.19819°W	City	Government & Politics, Government & Politics 19th Century
Sheppton Mine Disaster and Rescue		August 22, 2015	Schoolhouse Rd., Sheppton; 40.90244°N 76.12413°W	Roadside	Business & Industry, Coal, Government & Politics 20th Century, Labor
St. Michael's Church		November 4, 1984	Corner of Chestnut & Oak Sts., Shenandoah; 40.81893°N 76.20424°W	City	Ethnic & Immigration, Religion
Tulpehocken Path		September 16, 1949	Pa. 125 NW of Pine Grove (Missing)	Roadside	Native American, Paths & Trails, Transportation
Tulpehocken Path		February 7, 1950	Main St. (PA 25) near Forest Dr., between Hegins & Valley View; 40.64822°N 76.51758°W	Roadside	Native American, Paths & Trails, Transportation
Union Canal		February 17, 1950	Pa. 443 just S of Pine Grove near intersection of 665 & 443; 40.53993°N 76.38813°W	Roadside	Canals, Navigation, Transportation
Valley Furnace		October 20, 1948	N Valley St. (US 209) near Pine St., just E of New Philadelphia; 40.72218°N 76.11511°W	Roadside	Business & Industry, Coal, Furnaces
Victor Schertzinger (1888–1941)		September 1, 2006	115 W Centre St. (Wachovia Bank parking lot), Mahanoy City	Roadside	Music & Theater, Performers, Writers

== See also ==
- List of Pennsylvania state historical markers
- National Register of Historic Places listings in Schuylkill County, Pennsylvania
