= Gilberton, Pennsylvania =

Borough in Pennsylvania, US

- Borough
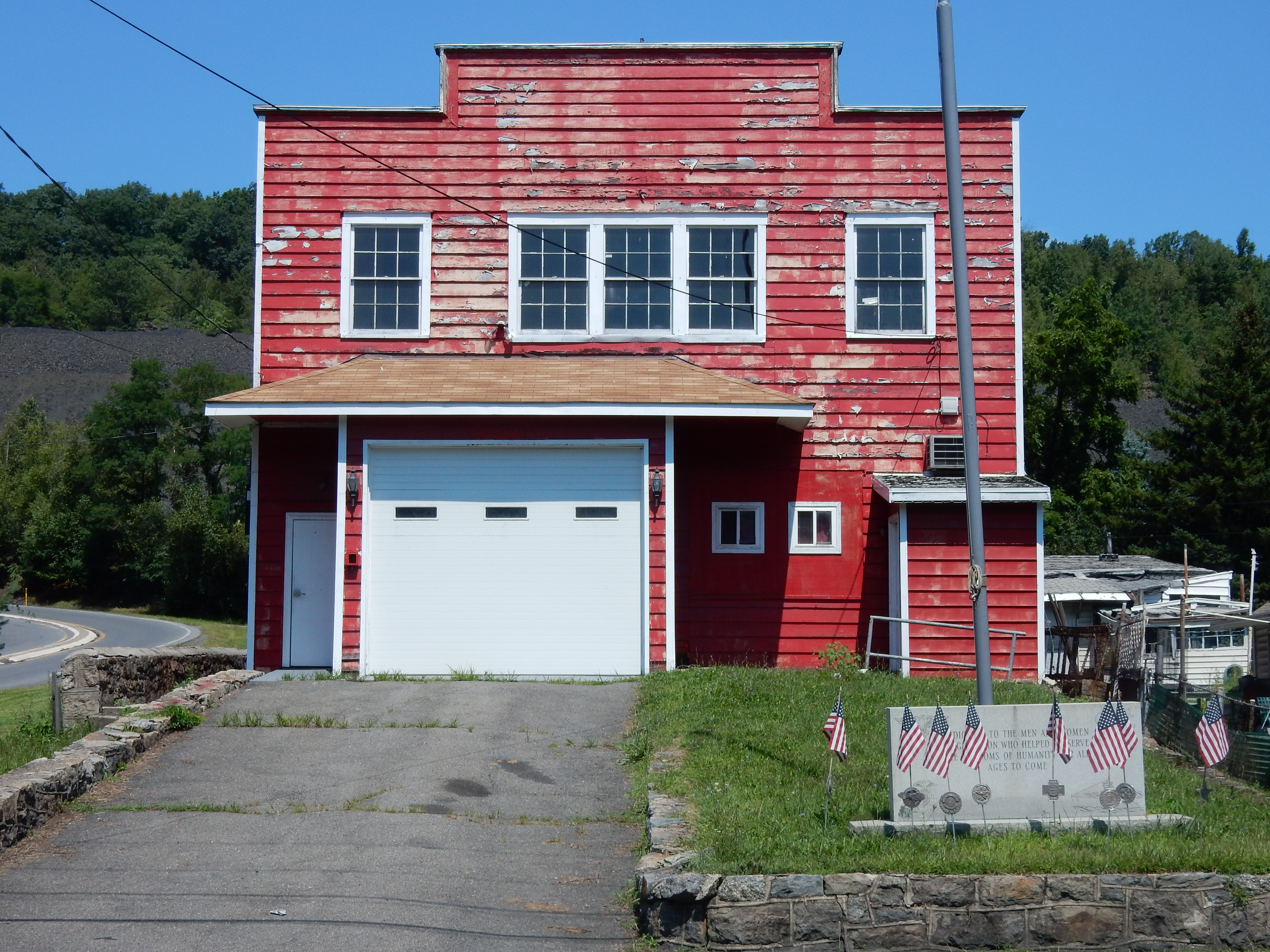
- Continental Hose Co. #3 in Gilberton.

- Location of Gilberton in Schuylkill County, Pennsylvania.

- Location in Pennsylvania Gilberton (the United States)
- Coordinates: 40°47′51″N 76°13′33″W
- Country: United States
- State: Pennsylvania
- County: Schuylkill
- Incorporated: 1873

Government
  - Type: Borough Council

Area
  - Total: 1.45 sq mi (3.76 km^{2})
  - Land: 1.42 sq mi (3.68 km^{2})
  - Water: 0.035 sq mi (0.09 km^{2})
- Elevation: 1,132 ft (345 m)

Population (2020)
  - Total: 579
  - Density: 407.9/sq mi (157.49/km^{2})
- Time zone: UTC-5 (Eastern (EST))
  - Summer (DST): UTC-4 (EDT)
- ZIP code: 17934; 17949 (Mahanoy Plane)
- Area code: 570
- FIPS code: 42-29088

Gilberton is a borough in Schuylkill County, Pennsylvania, United States, four miles (7 km) west by south of Mahanoy City. Its population was 583 at the 2020 census, a decline from the figure of 769 tabulated in 2010. Extensive deposits of anthracite coal are in the region, and coal-mining had been practiced by many of the 4,373 people who lived there in 1900. The coal-mining industry was thriving in 1910, and 5,401 people lived in Gilberton.

== Etymology ==
Gilberton is named for John Gilbert, a coal mine owner.

== Geography ==
Gilberton is located at 40°47′51″N 76°13′33″W (40.797496, -76.225781). According to the United States Census Bureau, the borough has a total area of 1.5 square miles (3.9 km^{2}), of which 1.4 square miles (3.6 km^{2}) is land and 0.04 square miles (0.10 km^{2}) (2.74%) is water.

The borough is made up of three small villages, Mahanoy Plane, Maizeville and Ducktown. (Gilberton Proper)

== Demographics ==
Historical population
Census	Pop.	Note	%±
1880	3,098		—
1890	3,687		19.0%
1900	4,373		18.6%
1910	5,401		23.5%
1920	4,766		−11.8%
1930	4,227		−11.3%
1940	3,710		−12.2%
1950	2,641		−28.8%
1960	1,712		−35.2%
1970	1,293		−24.5%
1980	1,096		−15.2%
1990	953		−13.0%
2000	867		−9.0%
2010	769		−11.3%
2020	579		−24.7%
2021 (est.)	583	▲	0.7%

As of the census of 2000, there were 867 people, 385 households, and 219 families residing in the borough. The population density was 608.3 inhabitants per square mile (234.9/km^{2}). There were 474 housing units at an average density of 332.6 per square mile (128.4/km^{2}). The racial makeup of the borough was 97.92% White, 0.35% Native American, 1.61% Asian, and 0.12% from two or more races. Hispanic or Latino of any race were 0.35% of the population.

There were 385 households, out of which 23.6% had children under the age of 18 living with them, 42.3% were married couples living together, 10.9% had a female householder with no husband present, and 43.1% were non-families. 40.3% of all households were made up of individuals, and 22.3% had someone living alone who was 65 years of age or older. The average household size was 2.25 and the average family size was 3.10.

In the borough the population was spread out, with 21.8% under the age of 18, 6.8% from 18 to 24, 29.3% from 25 to 44, 22.6% from 45 to 64, and 19.5% who were 65 years of age or older. The median age was 40 years. For every 100 females, there were 100.2 males. For every 100 women age 18 and over, there were 98.2 men.

The median income for a household in the borough was $24,792, and the median income for a family was $34,500. Males had a median income of $27,875 versus $21,000 for females. The per capita income for the borough was $14,785. About 9.5% of families and 10.6% of the population were below the poverty line, including 12.4% of those under age 18 and 7.7% of those age 65 or over.

== Gilberton Coal Company ==
Gilberton Coal Company was founded in 1940 by John B. Rich. It is located on the eastern edge of the borough on Gilberton Road and is still in operation.

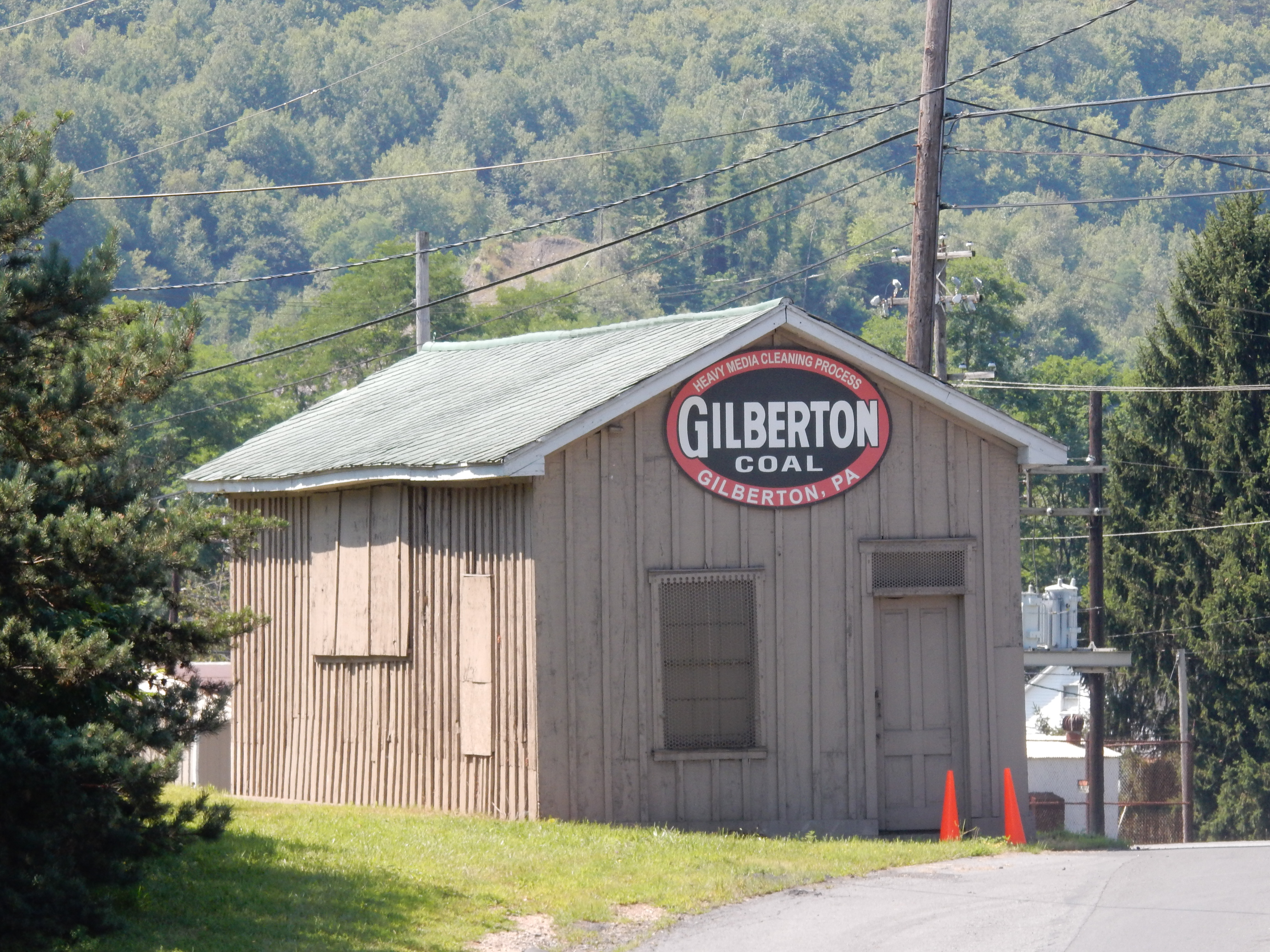

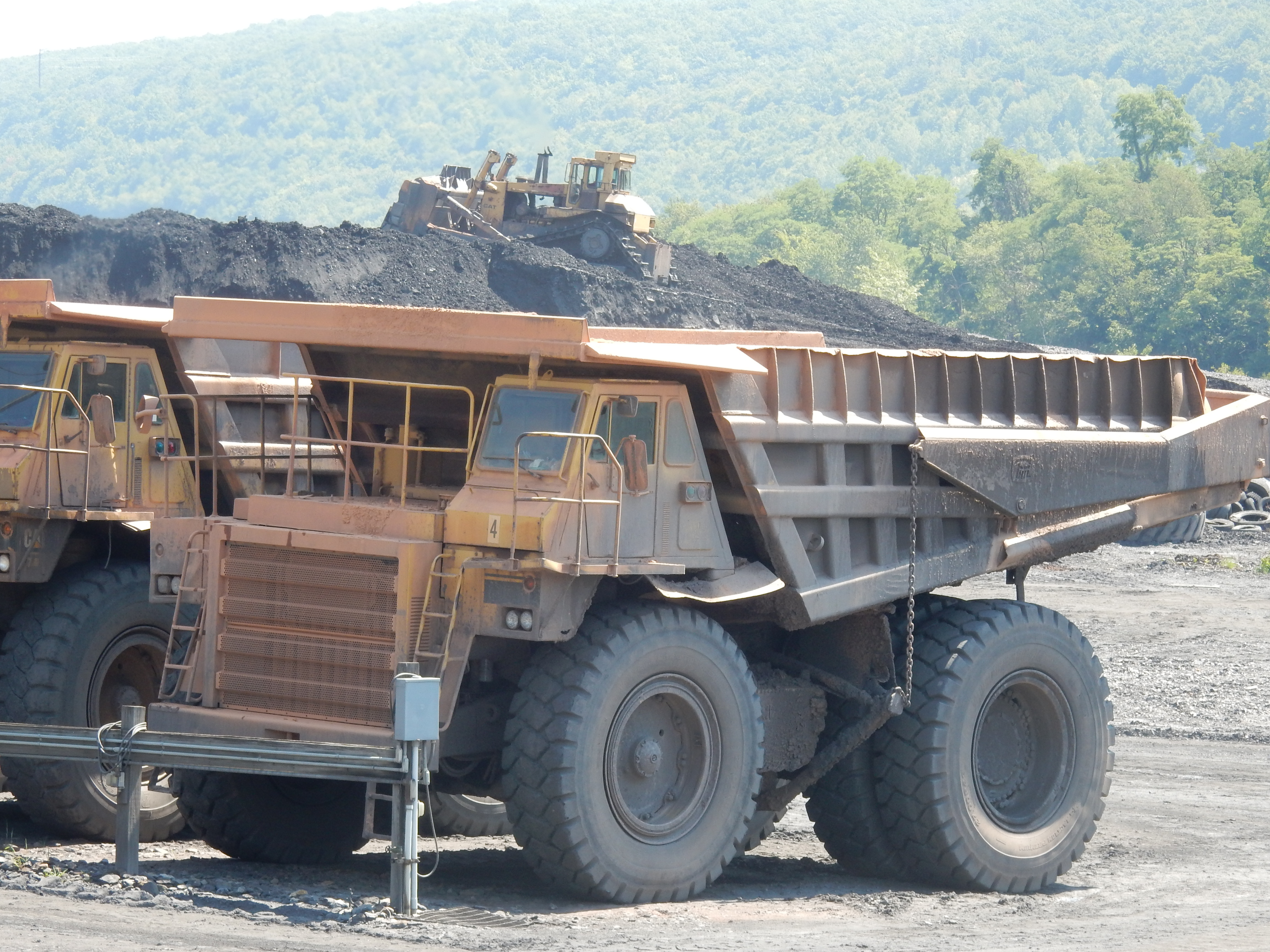

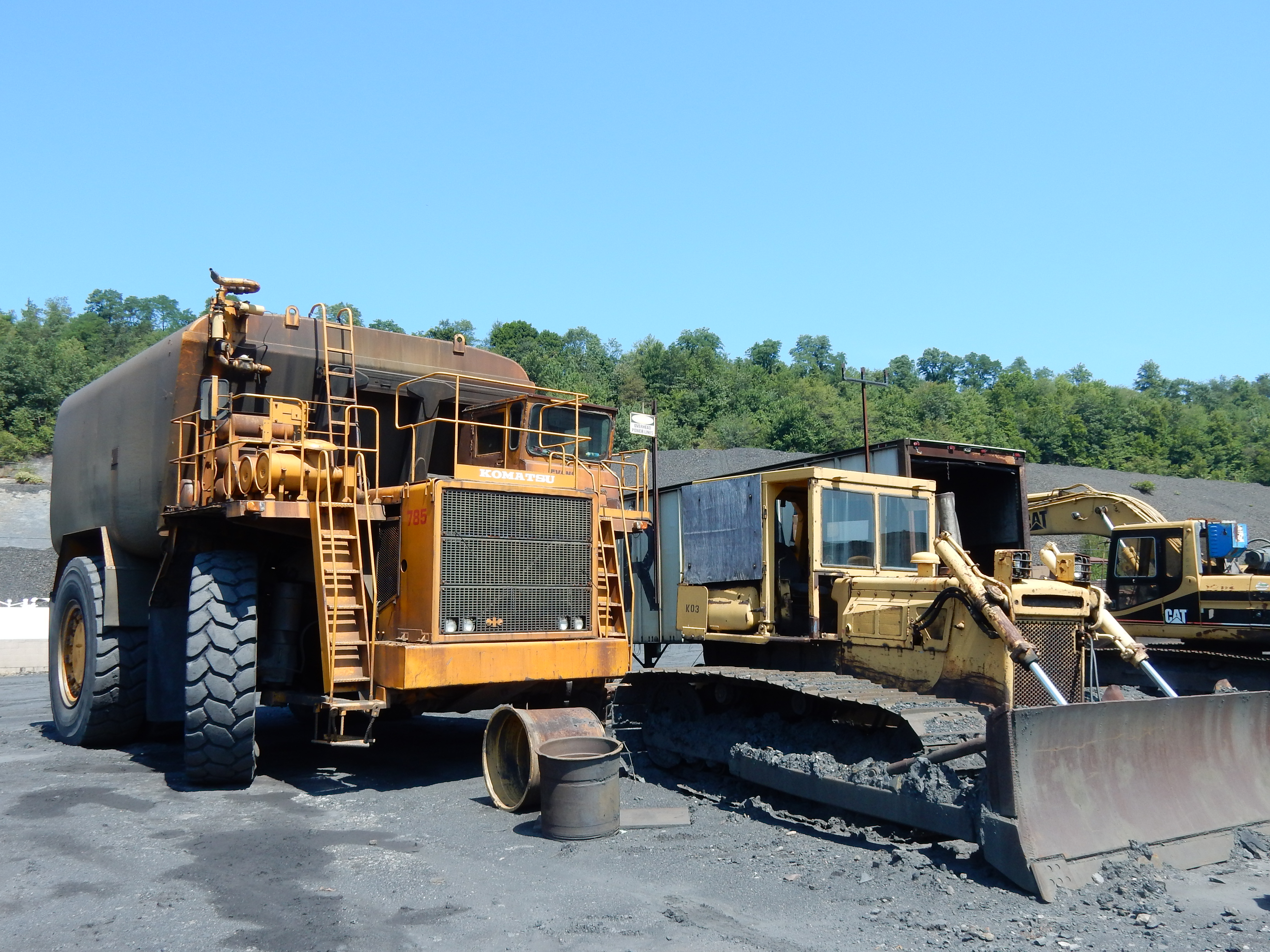

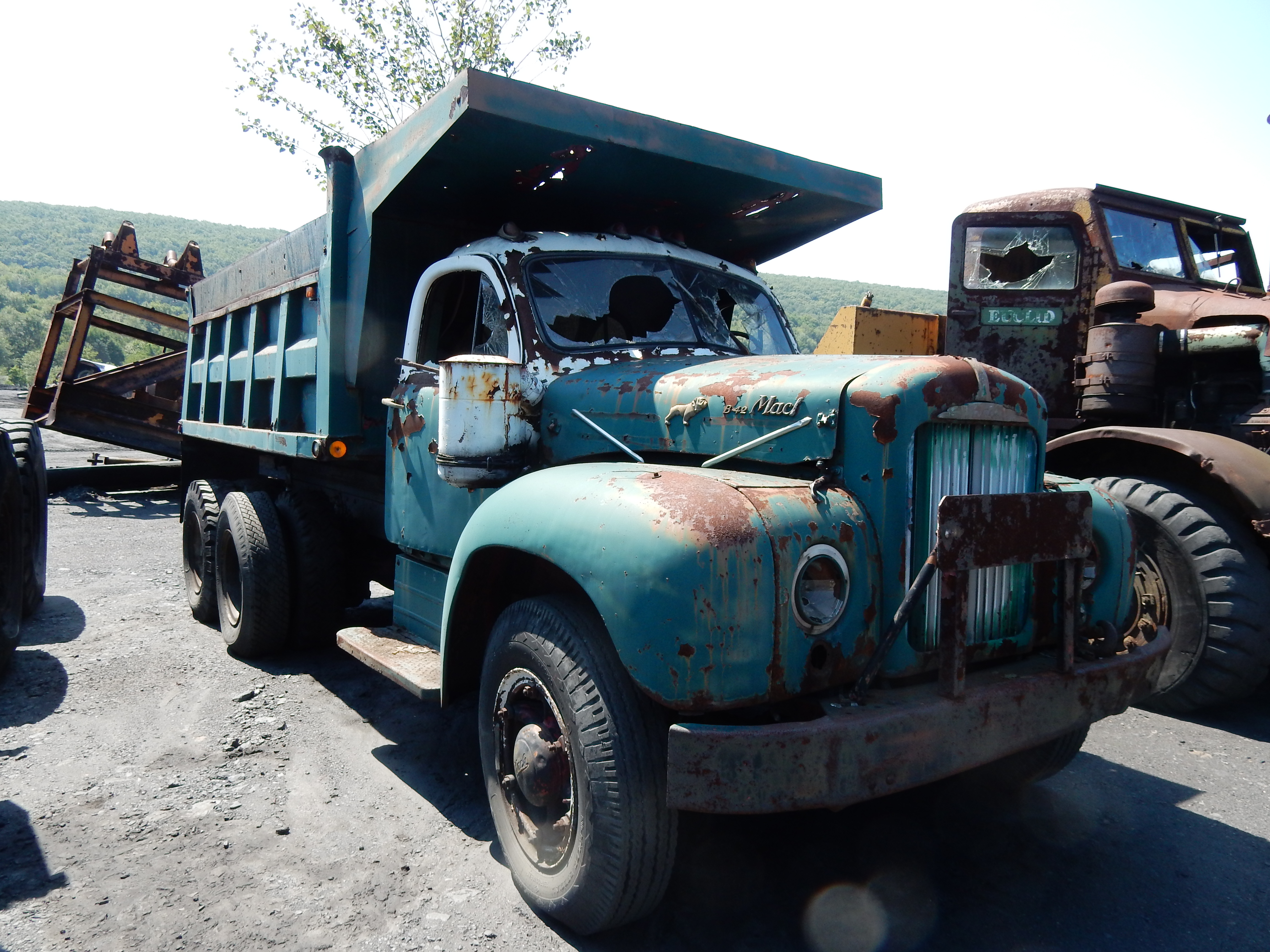

== Gallery ==
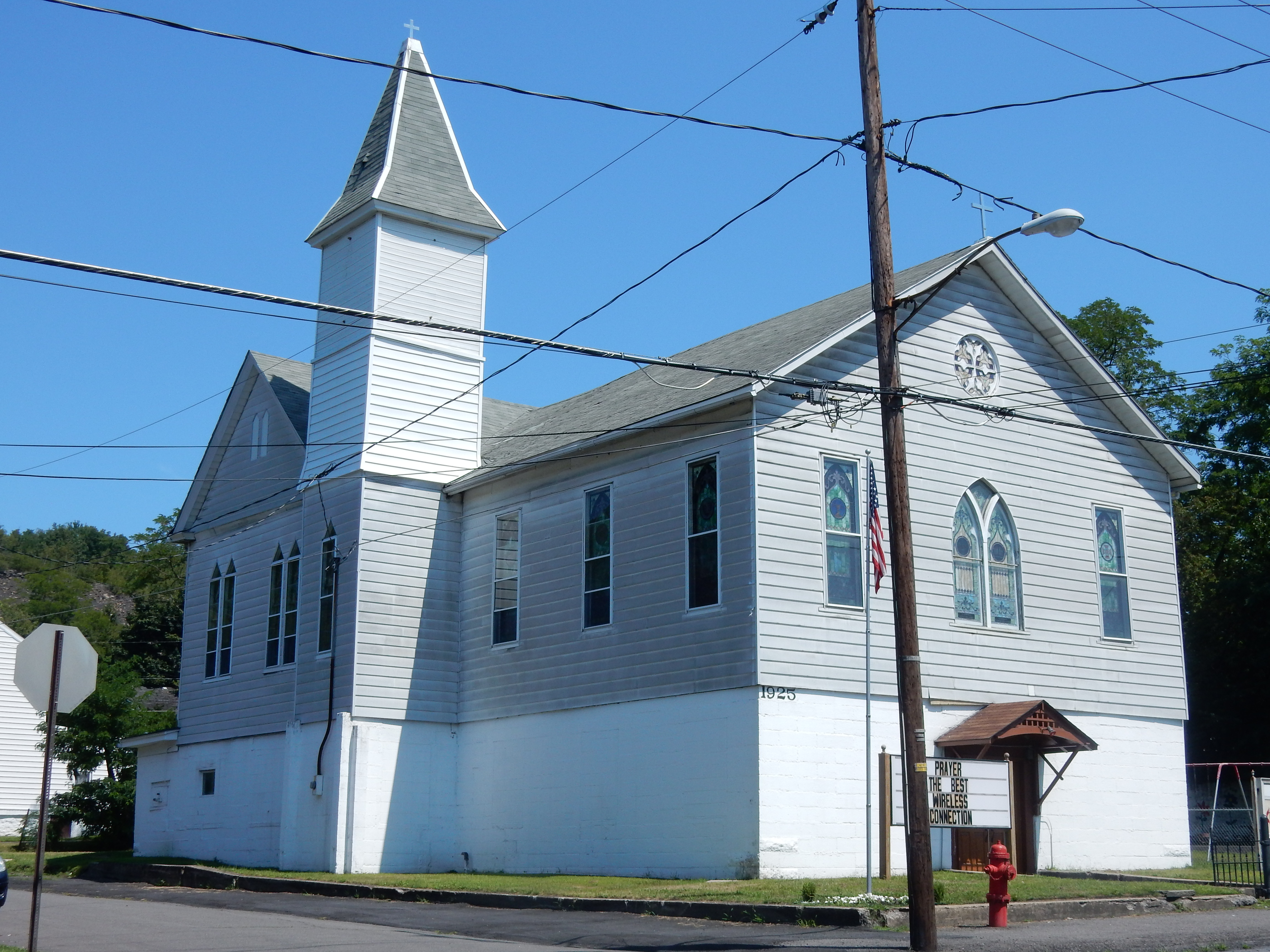
United Methodist Church in Gilberton.

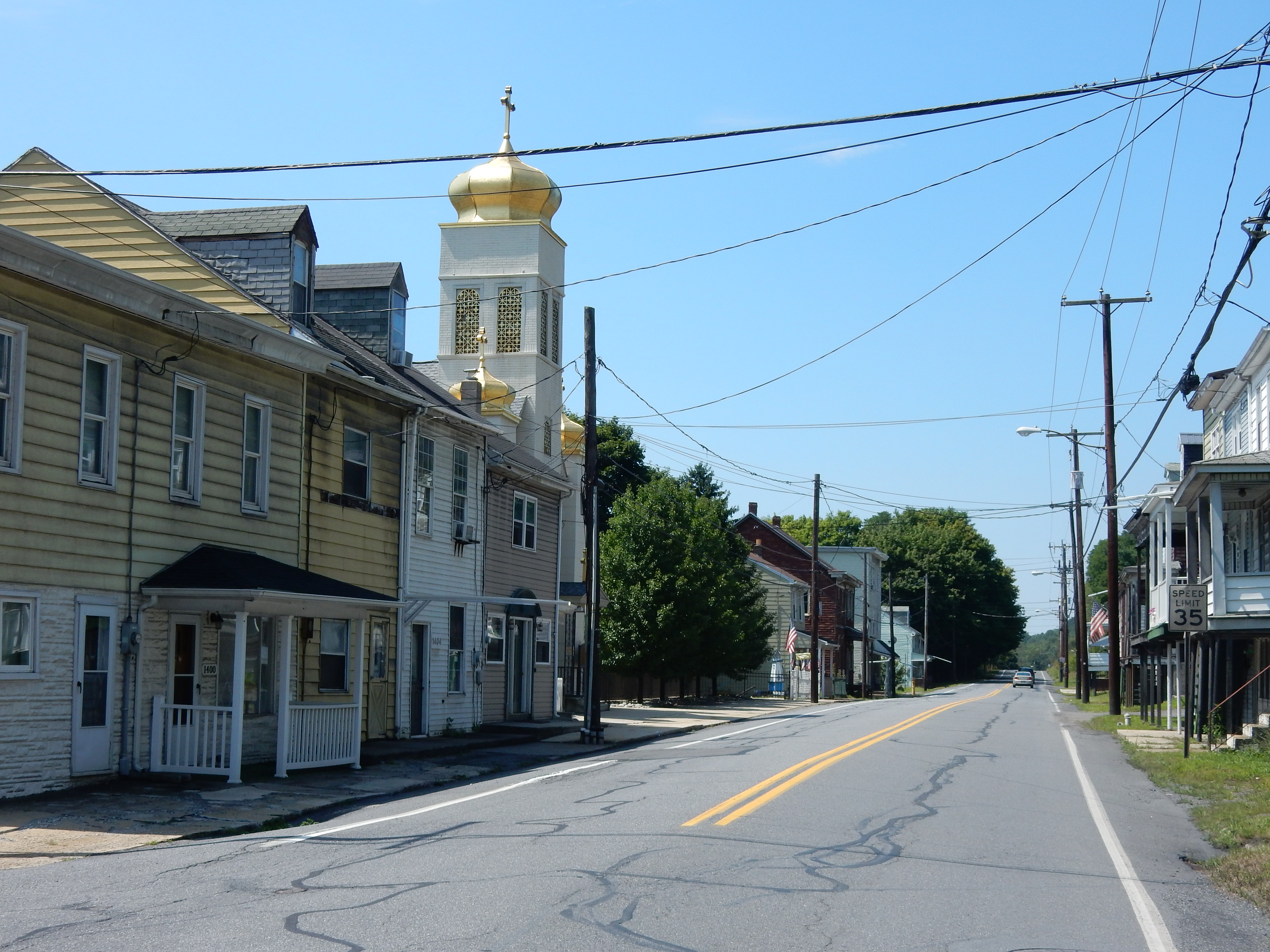
Main Street of Maizeville (PA 54).

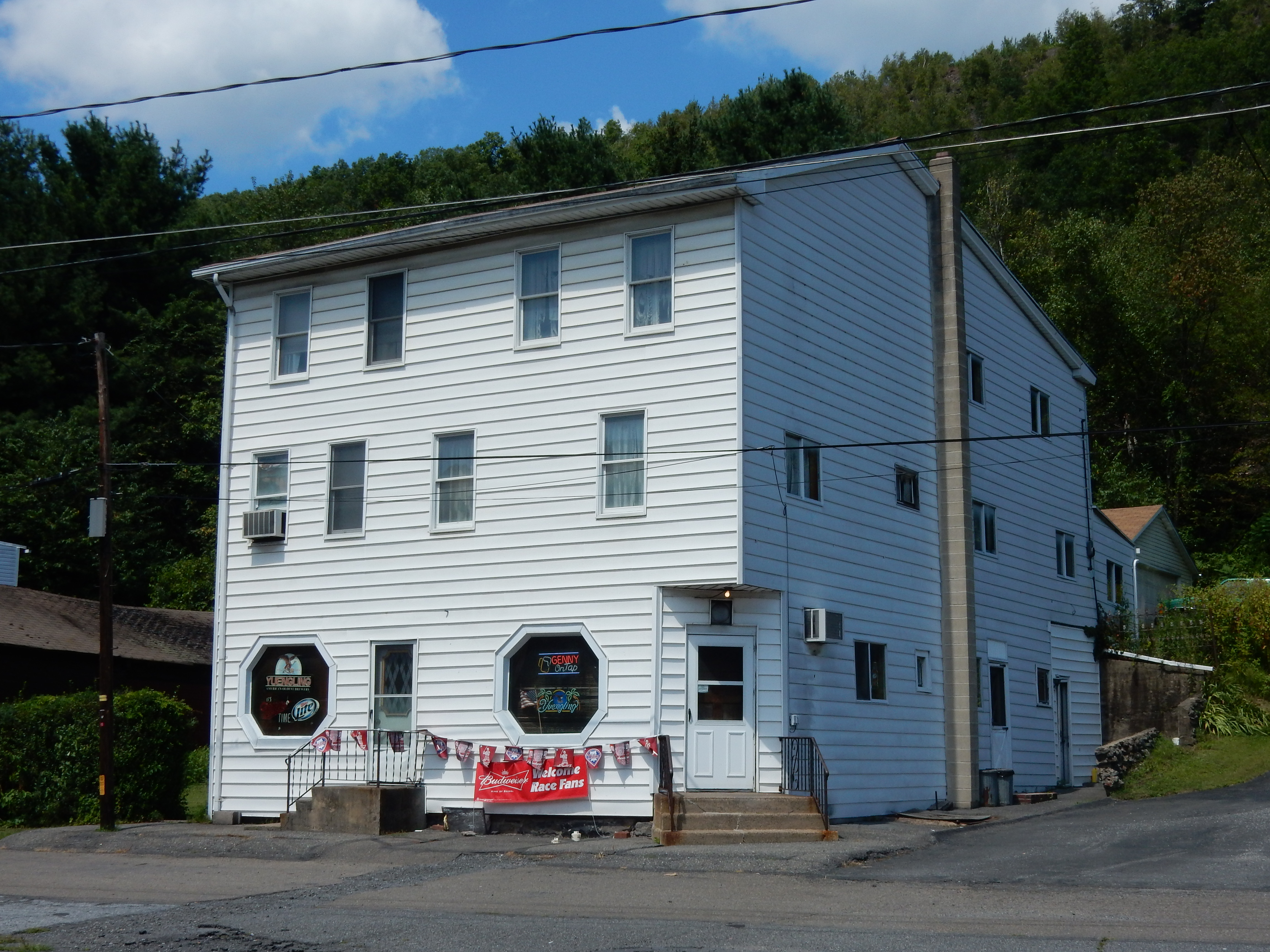
Naspinsky's Bar in Mahanoy Plane.

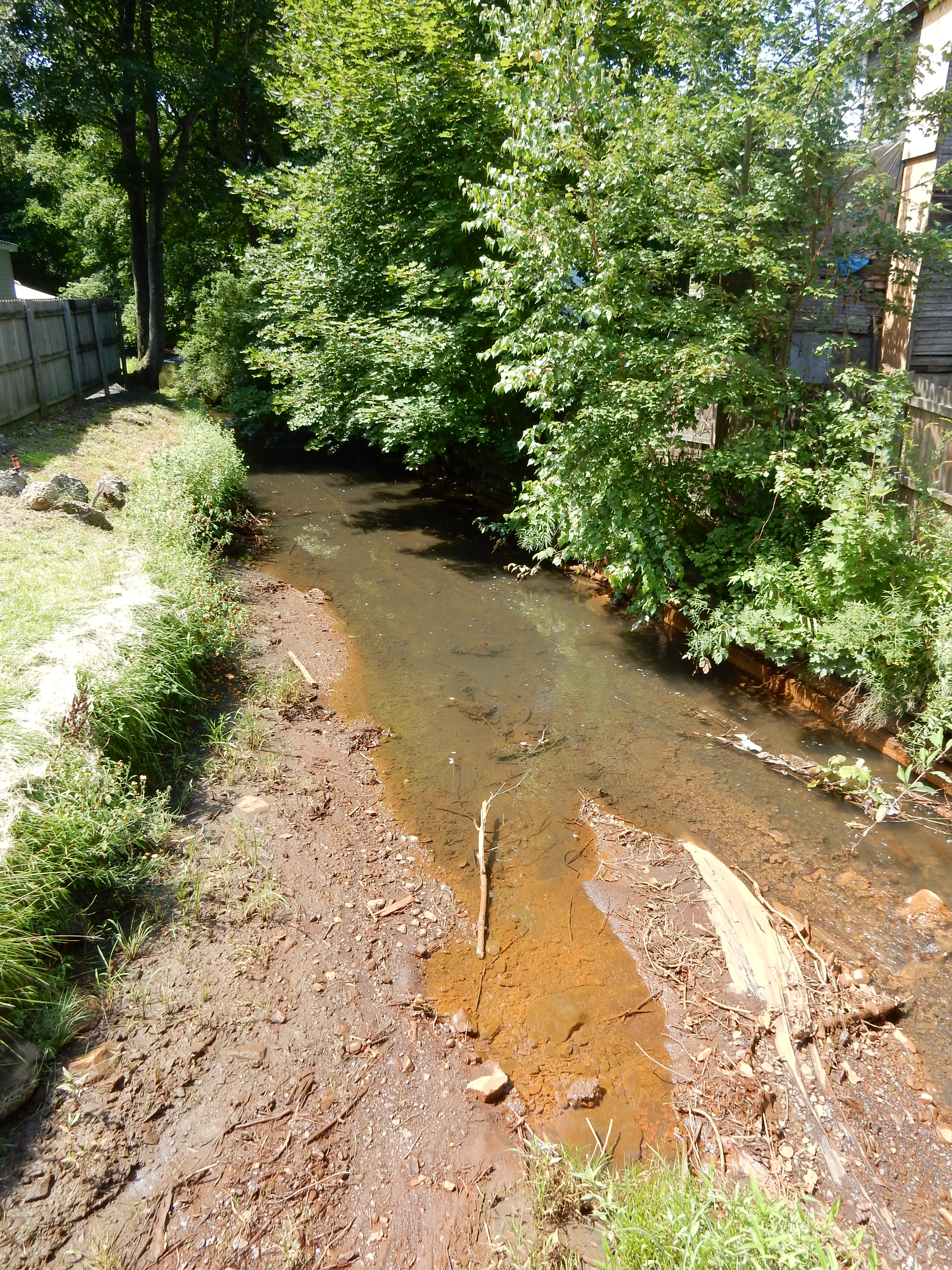
Mahanoy Creek in Mahanoy Plane.
