= Dornsife, Pennsylvania =

Unincorporated community in Pennsylvania, US

Coordinates: 40°44′44″N 76°47′21″W

- Unincorporated community
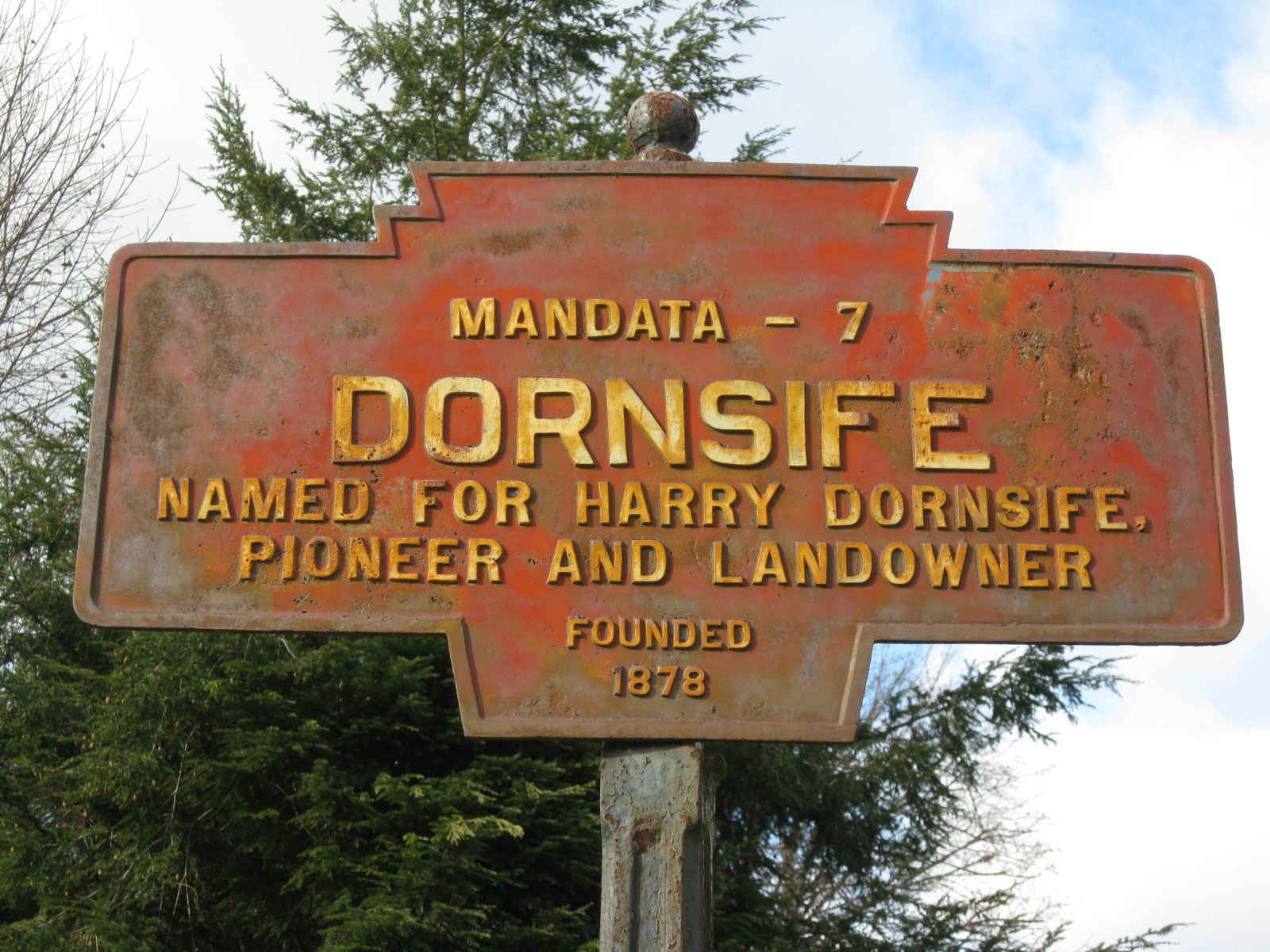
- Keystone marker
- Interactive map of Dornsife, Pennsylvania
- Country: United States
- State: Pennsylvania
- County: Northumberland
- Township: Little Mahanoy Township
- Time zone: UTC-5 (EST)
  - Summer (DST): UTC-4 (EDT)
- ZIP code: 17823

Dornsife is a populated place in Little Mahanoy Township, Northumberland County, Pennsylvania, United States, with a ZIP code of 17823. As of the 2010 U.S. Census, the ZIP Code Tabulation Area had a population of 1,273, with a median age of 41.9.

== Notable residents ==
- Glenn Ressler (b. 1943), professional football player
