= Mahanoy Plane =

Coordinates: 40°47′30.48″N 76°14′32.28″W

Overview
- Locale: Frackville, Pennsylvania, United States
- Dates of operation: July 16, 1861–February 27, 1932
- Successor: Mahanoy Tunnel

Technical
- Track gauge: 4 ft 8 1/2 in (1,435 mm) standard gauge

The Mahanoy Plane was a railroad Incline plane located along northern edge of the borough of Frackville, Schuylkill County, Pennsylvania in the Coal Region of the United States.

The Mahanoy and Broad Mountain Railroad, predecessor of the Reading Company opened the Mahanoy Plane on July 16, 1861. The Plane traversed Broad Mountain between the boroughs of Mahanoy Plane and Frackville. With a pitch of 28 degrees at its steepest point, the plane rose 524 feet (160 m) over a distance of 2,460 feet (750 m).

A 2,500 horsepower (1,900 kW) engine could hoist a three car trip, equivalent to 200 tons in three minutes. After a fire in 1868, new 6,000 horsepower (4,500 kW) engines were installed. These were supposedly the most powerful engines in the world, later surpassed only by the engines operating the locks on the Panama Canal. Approximately 800 to 900 railroad cars passed over the plane every twenty-four hours. The Mahanoy Plane ceased operation on February 27, 1932, due to the decline of Anthracite and the much easier route through the Mahanoy Tunnel.

Foundations are all that remain and there are currently no plans of historical preservation or restoration.

There was a previous “Mahanoy Plane” built in the same general area in 1834 by the Danville and Pottsville Railroad(D&P). This was incline plane Number 5 (of six) and was 345 feet high over 1,625 feet in length. Very quickly, however, the D&P closed the eastern section of railroad. By 1844, the eastern section, according to Rupp's History of Schuylkill County, was "rotting in the sun."

On September 8, 2007, the Pennsylvania Historical & Museum Commission erected a historical marker noting the Mahanoy Plane's historic importance.
