= Little Mahanoy Township, Northumberland County, Pennsylvania =

Township in Pennsylvania, US

Coordinates: 40°46′00″N 76°45′29″W

Little Mahanoy Township, Pennsylvania
- Township
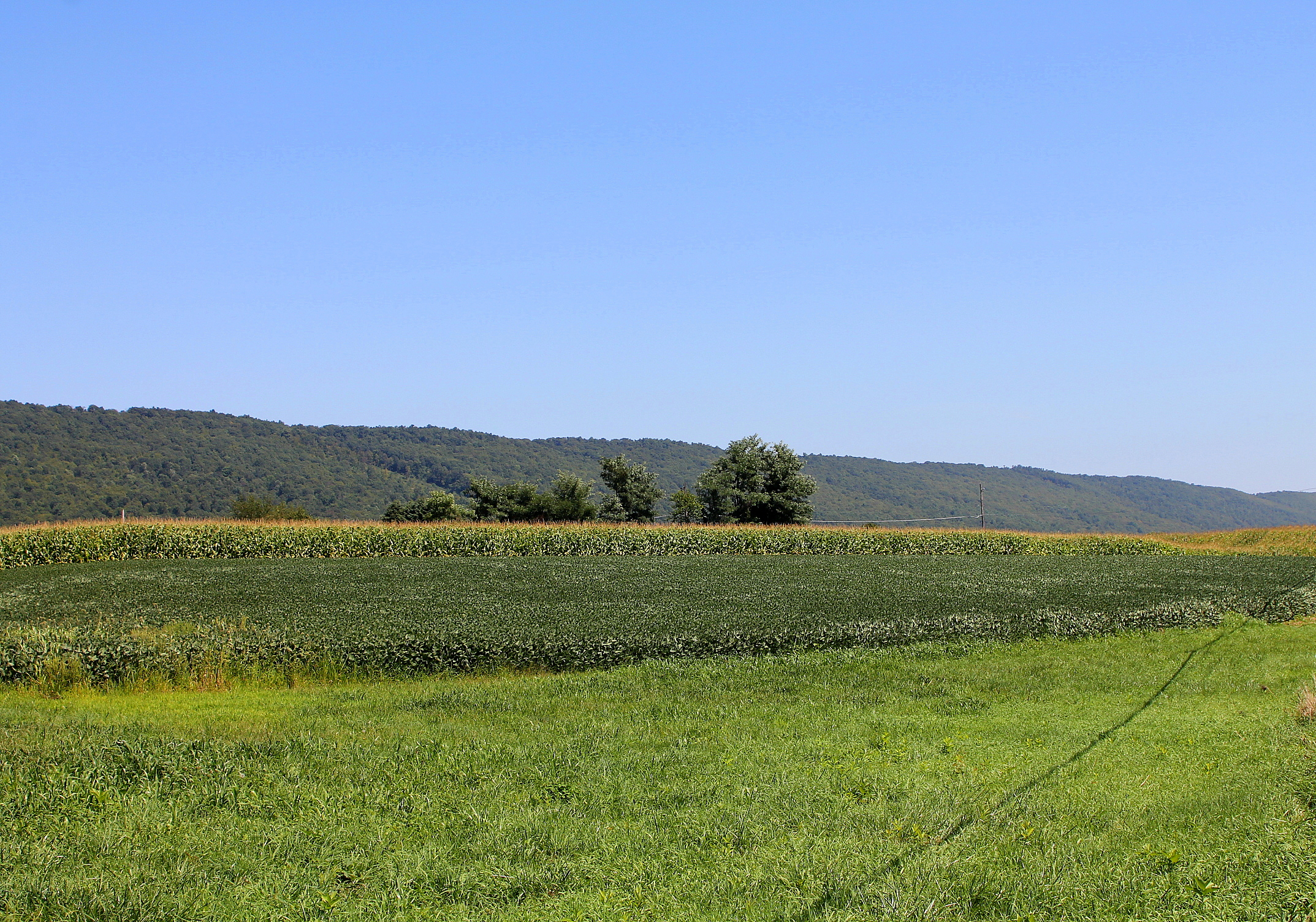
- View of Little Mahanoy Township

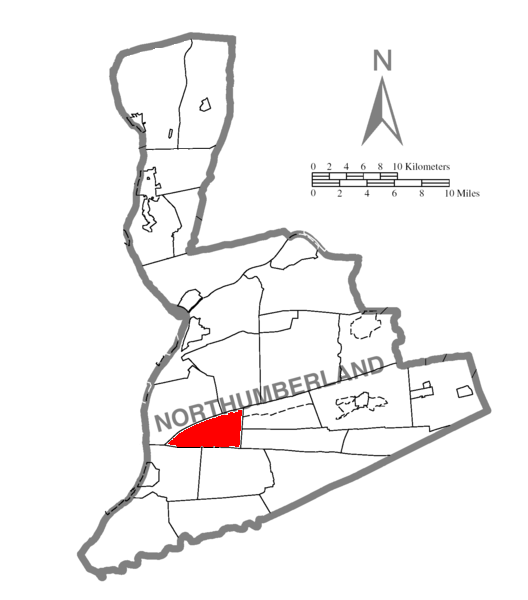
- Map of Northumberland County, Pennsylvania highlighting Little Mahanoy Township

- Map of Northumberland County, Pennsylvania
- Country: United States
- State: Pennsylvania
- County: Northumberland
- Settled: 1777
- Incorporated: 1813

Government
  - Type: Board of Supervisors

Area
  - Total: 10.50 sq mi (27.19 km^{2})
  - Land: 10.40 sq mi (26.93 km^{2})
  - Water: 0.10 sq mi (0.26 km^{2})

Population (2010)
  - Total: 479
  - Estimate (2016): 457
  - Density: 44.0/sq mi (16.97/km^{2})
- Time zone: UTC-5 (Eastern (EST))
  - Summer (DST): UTC-4 (EDT)
- Area code: 570
- FIPS code: 42-097-43912

Little Mahanoy Township is a township that is located in Northumberland County, Pennsylvania, United States. The population at the time of the 2010 Census was 479, a decline from the figure of 435 that was tabulated during the 2000 census.

== Geography ==
According to the United States Census Bureau, the township has a total area of 10.4 square miles (27.1 km^{2}), all land.

== Demographics ==
As of the census of 2000, there were 435 people, 151 households, and 109 families residing in the township.

The population density was 41.6 inhabitants per square mile (16.1/km^{2}). There were 159 housing units at an average density of 15.2/sq mi (5.9/km^{2}).

The racial makeup of the township was 99.08% White, 0.23% African American, 0.23% Asian, and 0.46% from two or more races.

There were 151 households, out of which 35.1% had children under the age of eighteen living with them; 63.6% were married couples living together, 6.6% had a female householder with no husband present, and 27.8% were non-families. 25.2% of all households were made up of individuals, and 15.2% had someone living alone who was sixty-five years of age or older.

The average household size was 2.88 and the average family size was 3.52.

Within the township, the population was spread out, with 32.9% of residents who were under the age of eighteen, 7.1% who were aged eighteen to twenty-four, 23.9% who were aged twenty-five to forty-four, 20.9% who were aged forty-five to sixty-four, and 15.2% who were sixty-five years of age or older. The median age was thirty-six years.

For every one hundred females, there were 96.8 males. For every one hundred females who were aged eighteen or older, there were 87.2 males.

The median income for a household in the township was $36,667, and the median income for a family was $45,500. Males had a median income of $32,639 compared with that of $18,125 for females.

The per capita income for the township was $14,844.

Approximately 5.4% of families and 5.9% of the population were living below the poverty line, including 5.4% of those who were under the age of eighteen and 10.9% of those who were aged sixty-five or older.

Historical population
Census	Pop.	Note	%±
1990	432		—
2000	435		0.7%
2010	479		10.1%
2016 (est.)	457		−4.6%
U.S. Decennial Census

== Gallery ==
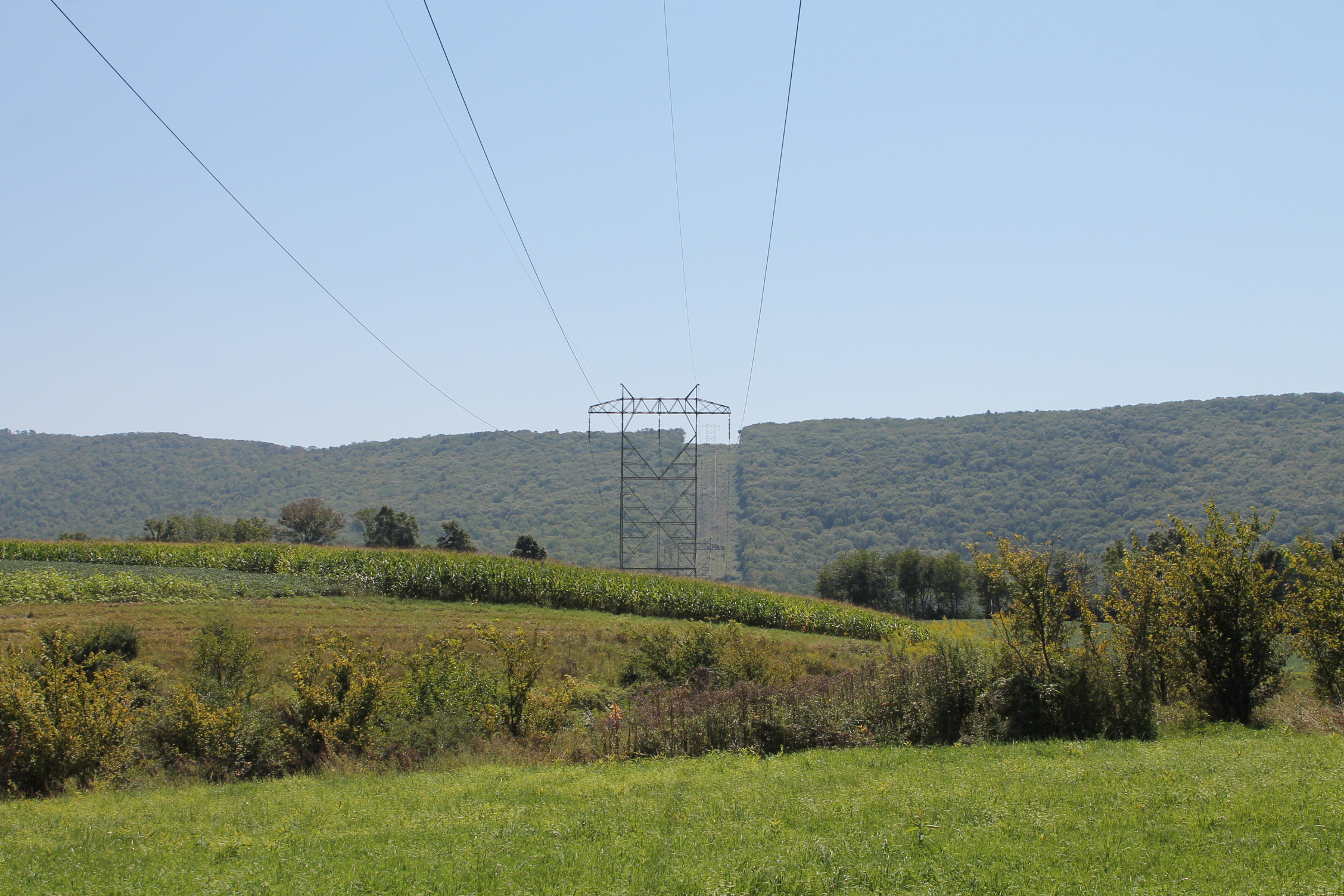
View of Little Mahanoy Township, Northumberland County
