= Potsdam II =

State electoral district of Germany

22: Potsdam II
- Electoral district for the Landtag of Brandenburg
- Potsdam II in 2024
- District: Potsdam
- Electorate: 52,482 (2024)
- Major settlements: Potsdam (partial)

Current electoral district
- Created: 1994
- Party: SPD
- Member: Daniel Keller

Potsdam II is an electoral constituency (German: Wahlkreis) represented in the Landtag of Brandenburg. It elects one member via first-past-the-post voting. Under the constituency numbering system, it is designated as constituency 22. It is located in within the city of Potsdam.

== Geography ==
The constituency includes the districts of Potsdam-Süd, Stern/Drewitz/Kirchsteigfeld and Südliche Innenstadt/Zentrum Ost.

There were 52,482 eligible voters in 2024.

== Members ==
Election	Member	Party	%
2004	Matthias Platzeck	SPD	41.3
2009	Hans-Jürgen Scharfenberg	Left	42.8
2014	Hans-Jürgen Scharfenberg	Left	38.4
2019	Daniel Keller	SPD	26.5
2024	Daniel Keller	SPD	42.8

== Election results ==
=== 2024 election ===
State election (2024): Uckermack II
Notes:	Blue background denotes the winner of the electorate vote. Pink background denotes a candidate elected from their party list. Yellow background denotes an electorate win by a list member, or other incumbent. A ✓ or ✗ denotes status of any incumbent, win or lose respectively.						
Party	Candidate	Votes	%	±%	Party votes	%	±%
SPD	✓ Daniel Keller	15,898	42.8	▲16.3	12,849	34.3	▲6.2
AfD	Chaled-Uwe Said	8,863	23.8	▲6.3	7,862	21.0	▲2.5
BSW					5,353	14.3	
CDU	Steeven Bretz	4,023	10.8	▲1.0	3,292	8.8	▼1.0
Left	Wollenberg	2,991	8.0	▼16.1	2,084	5.6	▼12.6
Greens	Posenauer	2,140	5.8	▼6.4	3,070	8.2	▼5.8
APT					1,039	2.8	▼0.4
BVB/FW	Soyka	1,552	4.2	▲1.3	598	1.6	▼0.8
Plus	Richter	1,267	3.4		780	2.1	Steady
FDP	Floiger	447	1.2	▼1.9	330	0.9	▼2.7
Values					93	0.2	
DLW					85	0.2	
DKP					42	0.1	
Third Way					30	0.1	
Informal votes		639			313		
Total valid votes		37,181			37,507		
Turnout		37,820	72.1	▲11.3			
SPD hold	Majority	7,035	19.0	▲16.8			

=== 2019 election ===
State election (2019): Potsdam II
Notes:	Blue background denotes the winner of the electorate vote. Pink background denotes a candidate elected from their party list. Yellow background denotes an electorate win by a list member, or other incumbent. A ✓ or ✗ denotes status of any incumbent, win or lose respectively.						
Party	Candidate	Votes	%	±%	Party votes	%	±%
SPD	Daniel Keller	8,449	26.5	▼1.4	8,973	28.1	▼3.5
Left	✗ Dr. Hans-Jürgen Scharfenberg	7,689	24.1	▼14.3	5,793	18.1	▼12.5
AfD	Chaled-Uwe Said	5,591	17.5	▲7.6	5,888	18.4	▲7.6
Greens	Frauke Havekost	3,879	12.2	▲7.1	4,478	14.0	▲7.2
CDU	Steeven Bretz	3,143	9.9	▼4.0	3,113	9.8	▼3.7
Die PARTEI	Sylvia Swierkowski	976	3.1				
FDP	Andrea Ney	974	3.1	▲2.2	1,142	3.6	▲2.6
Tierschutzpartei					1,012	3.2	
BVB/FW	Irene Kamenz	903	2.8	▲1.4	755	2.4	▲1.3
Pirates					342	1.1	▼1.3
ÖDP					307	1.0	
Independent	Ingo Charnow	166	0.5				
V-Partei3					125	0.4	
German Communist Party	Michael Grüß	111	0.3				
Informal votes		395			348		
Total valid votes		31,881			31,928		
Turnout		32,276	60.7	▲12.5			
SPD gain from Left	Majority	760	2.2				

=== 2014 election ===
State election (2014): Potsdam II
Notes:	Blue background denotes the winner of the electorate vote. Pink background denotes a candidate elected from their party list. Yellow background denotes an electorate win by a list member, or other incumbent. A ✓ or ✗ denotes status of any incumbent, win or lose respectively.						
Party	Candidate	Votes	%	±%	Party votes	%	±%
Left	✓ Dr. Hans-Jürgen Scharfenberg	9,824	38.4	▼4.4	7,850	30.6	▼5.4
SPD	Ulrike Häfner	7,139	27.9	▼3.5	8,100	31.6	▼4.0
CDU	Steeven Bretz	3,549	13.9	▲1.6	3,455	13.5	▲2.5
AfD	Stefan Hein	2,541	9.9		2,774	10.8	
Greens	Uwe Fröhlich	1,312	5.1	▼0.8	1,742	6.8	▲0.5
Pirates	Jan Weisbrod	595	2.3		626	2.4	
NPD					365	1.4	▼0.1
BVB/FW	Bettina Sommerlatte-Hennig	368	1.4	▼0.3	292	1.1	▼0.2
FDP	Dominique Römhild	226	0.9	▼3.8	251	1.0	▼4.2
DKP					122	0.5	▲0.1
REP					53	0.2	Steady
Informal votes		428			352		
Total valid votes		25,554			25,630		
Turnout		25,982	48.2	▼18.4			
Left hold	Majority	2,685	14.0	▲2.6			

=== 2009 election ===
State election (2009): Potsdam II
Notes:	Blue background denotes the winner of the electorate vote. Pink background denotes a candidate elected from their party list. Yellow background denotes an electorate win by a list member, or other incumbent. A ✓ or ✗ denotes status of any incumbent, win or lose respectively.						
Party	Candidate	Votes	%	±%	Party votes	%	±%
Left	Hans-Jürgen Scharfenberg	14,813	42.8	▲3.4	12,610	36.0	▼1.6
SPD	Mike Schubert	10,892	31.4	▼9.9	12,460	35.6	▲3.5
CDU	Steeven Bretz	4,273	12.3	▲1.3	3,845	11.0	▼0.5
Greens	Jürgen Stelter	2,061	5.9	▲3.4	2,212	6.3	▲1.6
FDP	Marcel Yon	1,624	4.7	▲2.1	1,818	5.2	▲3.0
NPD					510	1.5	
BVB/FW	Matthias Schröter	580	1.7		444	1.3	
DVU					428	1.2	▼2.8
Independent	Dieter Gohlke	403	1.2				
RRP					238	0.7	
50Plus					175	0.5	▼0.3
DKP					125	0.4	▲0.1
Die-Volksinitiative					68	0.2	
REP					56	0.2	
Informal votes		1,137			794		
Total valid votes		34,646			34,989		
Turnout		35,783	66.6	▲7.4			
Left hold	Majority	3,921	11.4	▲10.5			

=== 2004 election ===
State election (2004): Oberhavel I
Notes:	Blue background denotes the winner of the electorate vote. Pink background denotes a candidate elected from their party list. Yellow background denotes an electorate win by a list member, or other incumbent. A ✓ or ✗ denotes status of any incumbent, win or lose respectively.						
Party	Candidate	Votes	%	±%	Party votes	%	±%
SPD	Matthias Platzeck	12,805	41.34		9,959	32.07	
PDS	Hans-Jürgen Scharfenberg	12,217	39.44		11,678	37.60	
CDU	Sven Petke	3,399	10.97		3,562	11.47	
FDP	Astrid Tributh	790	2.55		675	2.17	
Greens	Michael Kellner	774	2.50		1,468	4.73	
Familie					1,449	4.67	
DVU					1,227	3.95	
Gray Panthers					346	1.11	
50Plus					239	0.77	
AUB-Brandenburg	Andreas Martin	596	1.92		123	0.40	
Yes Brandenburg					76	0.24	
AfW (Free Voters)	Dirk Promnitz	395	1.28		74	0.24	
DKP					89	0.29	
BRB					62	0.20	
Schill					29	0.09	
Informal votes		699			619		
Total valid votes		30,976			31,056		
Turnout		31,675	59.20				
SPD win new seat	Majority	588	1.90				

== See also ==
- Politics of Brandenburg
- Landtag of Brandenburg
