= Bretz (surname) =

Bretz is a surname. Notable people with the surname include:

- Eleonora Bretz, Luxembourgish-Greek female model
- George Bretz (1880–1956), Canadian lacrosse player
- George Bretz (photographer), American photographer
- Greg Bretz (born 1990), American snowboarder
- Harley 'J Harlen" Bretz (1882–1981), American geologist, first to recognize evidence of the Missoula Floods, also known as the Bretz Floods
- Jim Bretz (born 1964), American baseball coach and scout
- John L. Bretz (1852–1920), U.S. Representative from Indiana
- Steeven Bretz (born 1976), German politician
