= Bretz =

Bretz may refer to:

- Bretz (surname)
- Bretz, Preston County, West Virginia, an unincorporated community in Preston County, West Virginia
- Bretz, Tucker County, West Virginia, an unincorporated community in Tucker County, West Virginia
- Old Bretz Mill, California, an unincorporated community in Fresno County
- J. Harlen, Bretz, an American geologist, best known for his research that led to the acceptance of the Missoula Floods.
