= Shenandoah, Pennsylvania =

Borough in Pennsylvania, US

- Borough
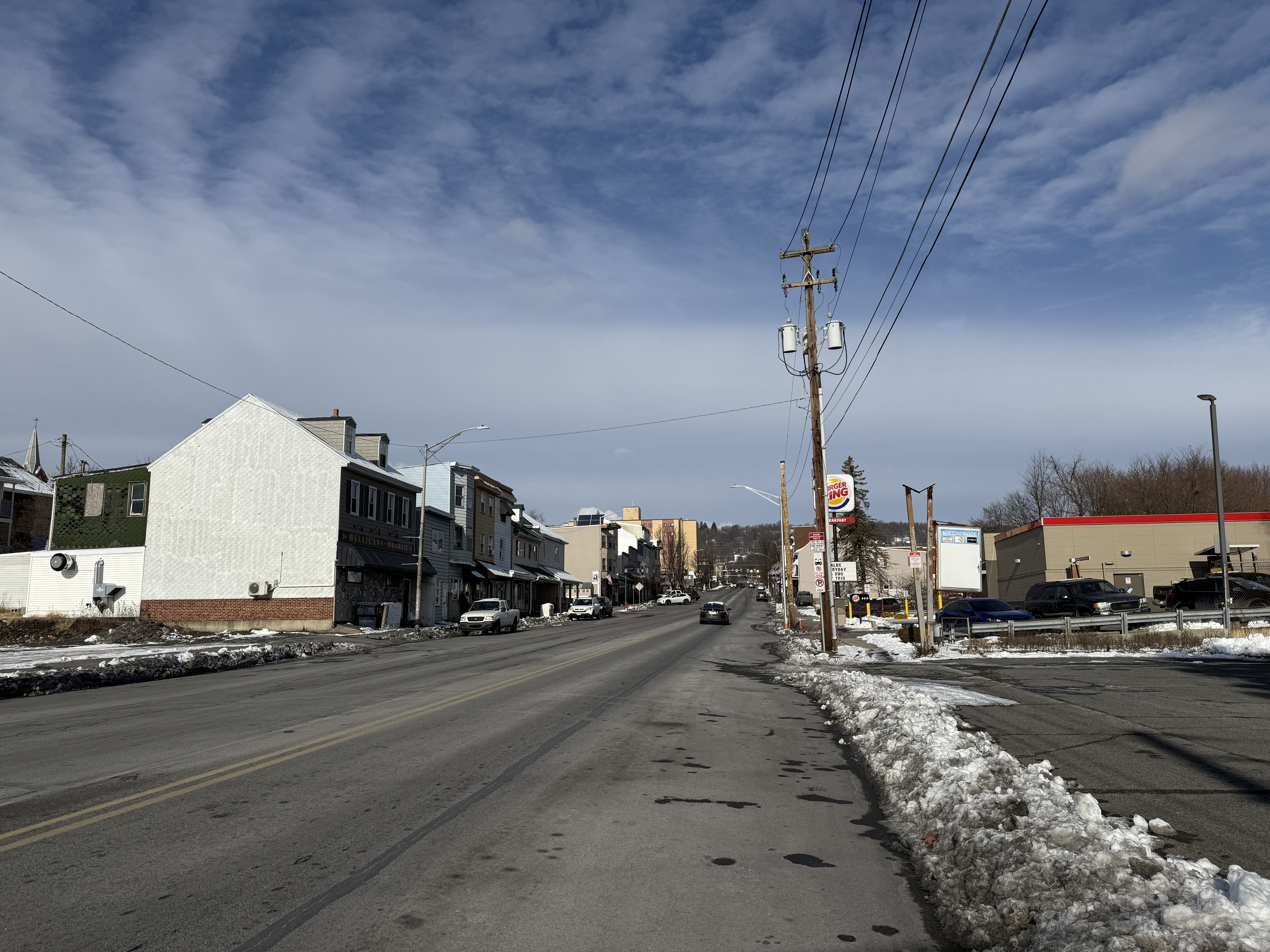
- Main Street in Shenandoah

- Flag

- Location of Shenandoah in Schuylkill County, Pennsylvania.

- Location in Pennsylvania Shenandoah (the United States)
- Coordinates: 40°49′11″N 76°12′10″W
- Country: United States
- State: Pennsylvania
- County: Schuylkill
- Settled: 1820
- Incorporated: 1866

Government
  - Type: Borough Council
  - Mayor: Bob Cook
  - Council President: Joseph R. Boris
  - Council Vice President: Mike Zeckie Uholick
  - Councilors: List: Mike Whitecavage; Jacob Alinsky; Diane Korenda; Andrew Szczyglak

Area
  - Total: 1.58 sq mi (4.09 km^{2})
  - Land: 1.51 sq mi (3.91 km^{2})
  - Water: 0.066 sq mi (0.17 km^{2})

Population (2020)
  - Total: 4,249 ▼
  - Estimate (2021): 4,247
  - Density: 3,150.6/sq mi (1,216.46/km^{2})
- Time zone: UTC-5 (Eastern (EST))
  - Summer (DST): UTC-4 (EDT)
- ZIP code: 17976
- Area code: 570
- FIPS code: 42-70056
- Website: http://shenandoahpa.org/

Shenandoah (Note: pronounced Shendo, Shando, Shanado, Shandore, Shenado, Shanadore, Shanadaw, Shenandoor, Chendo) is a borough in Schuylkill County in the Coal Region of Pennsylvania. It is distinct from Shenandoah Heights, which is part of West Mahanoy Township immediately to the north. As of 2021, the borough's population was 4,247.

Shenandoah is located approximately 53.5 miles (86.1 km) northwest of Allentown, 102.3 miles (164.6 km) northwest of Philadelphia, and 144.5 miles (232.6 km) miles west of New York City.

== History ==
The area that ultimately became Shenandoah was first settled by a farmer named Peter Kehley in 1835. Kehley cleared a patch of land at the center of the valley and built a log cabin and maintained his farm for about 20 years in total isolation. He sold his claim to the Philadelphia Land Company, which in anticipation of the opening of coal mines in the area, laid out the town in 1862.

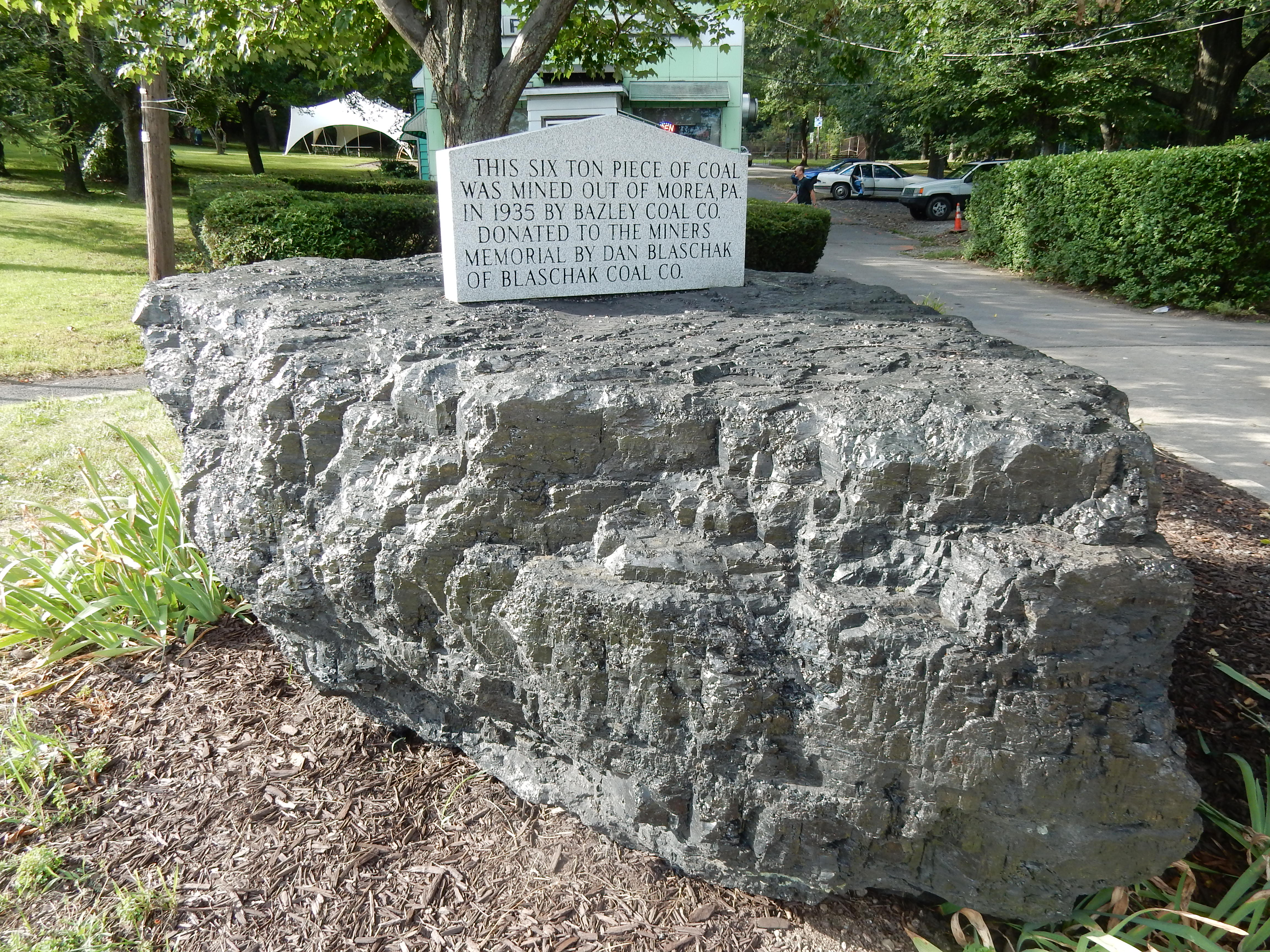
Six ton piece of coal at Girard Park.

Booming growth occurred during the Civil War years caused by the development and opening of several anthracite coal mines. The area was incorporated as a borough in 1866 and was a famous hotbed of activity during the era of the Molly Maguires in the 1870s.

After the original influx of English, Welsh, Irish, and German immigrants a large influx of people from central, eastern and southern European countries such as Poland, Lithuania, and Italy occurred in the decades before and after the turn of the 20th century.

1889 Panoramic Map of Shenandoah, Pennsylvania

The Lehigh Valley Railroad Station served as the main passenger terminal in Shenandoah, but because of the coal industry, it was not the only railroad to service Shenandoah. The town was also served by the Pennsylvania Railroad and Reading Railroad, making Shenandoah the only borough in Pennsylvania to be served by three railroad companies.

In Schuylkill County Court, in January 1902, those interested filed their petition for retail, wholesale, bottling or brewing licenses at the Office of the Clerk of the Court. Shenandoah was represented with bars and breweries. This coal town offered more bars per thousand people than any other location in the world.

During the Great Coal Strike of 1902 the Pennsylvania National Guard was called into Shenandoah to keep the peace and curb rioting by angry miners. The strike would only be resolved after President Theodore Roosevelt intervened.

By 1920, the town had a population of nearly 30,000 residents.

The community was hard hit by the decline of the anthracite coal industry after World War II and heavy emigration by coal miners occurred in order to find work elsewhere.

Shenandoah, the rise and fall of the coal industry, and the dismantling of the Molly Maguires was one of the subjects examined by George Leighton in his 1939 book Five Cities: The Story of Their Youth and Old Age.

Shenandoah Valley was featured in the documentary 2012 film "Shenandoah, Pennsylvania" exploring the hate crime murder of Luis Ramirez and the local police attempting to cover it up.

== Etymology ==
The origin of the name Shenandoah is much debated. One theory holds that Shenandoah received its name from an Indian word meaning 'sprucy stream' or 'river flowing alongside high hills and mountains'. Another origin theory is that the town was named after the Shenandoah Valley in Virginia. The Virginia valley in turn took its name from an Iroquoian word meaning 'deer'.

== Geography ==
Shenandoah is located at 40°49′11″N 76°12′10″W (40.819753, -76.202883).

According to the United States Census Bureau, the borough has a total area of 1.6 square miles (4.1 km^{2}), of which 1.5 square miles (3.9 km^{2}) is land and 0.1 square miles (0.26 km^{2}) (3.80%) is water. It has a warm-summer humid continental climate (Dfb) and average monthly temperatures range from 25.0 °F in January to 69.5 °F in July. PRISM Climate Group at Oregon State University The hardiness zone is 6a.

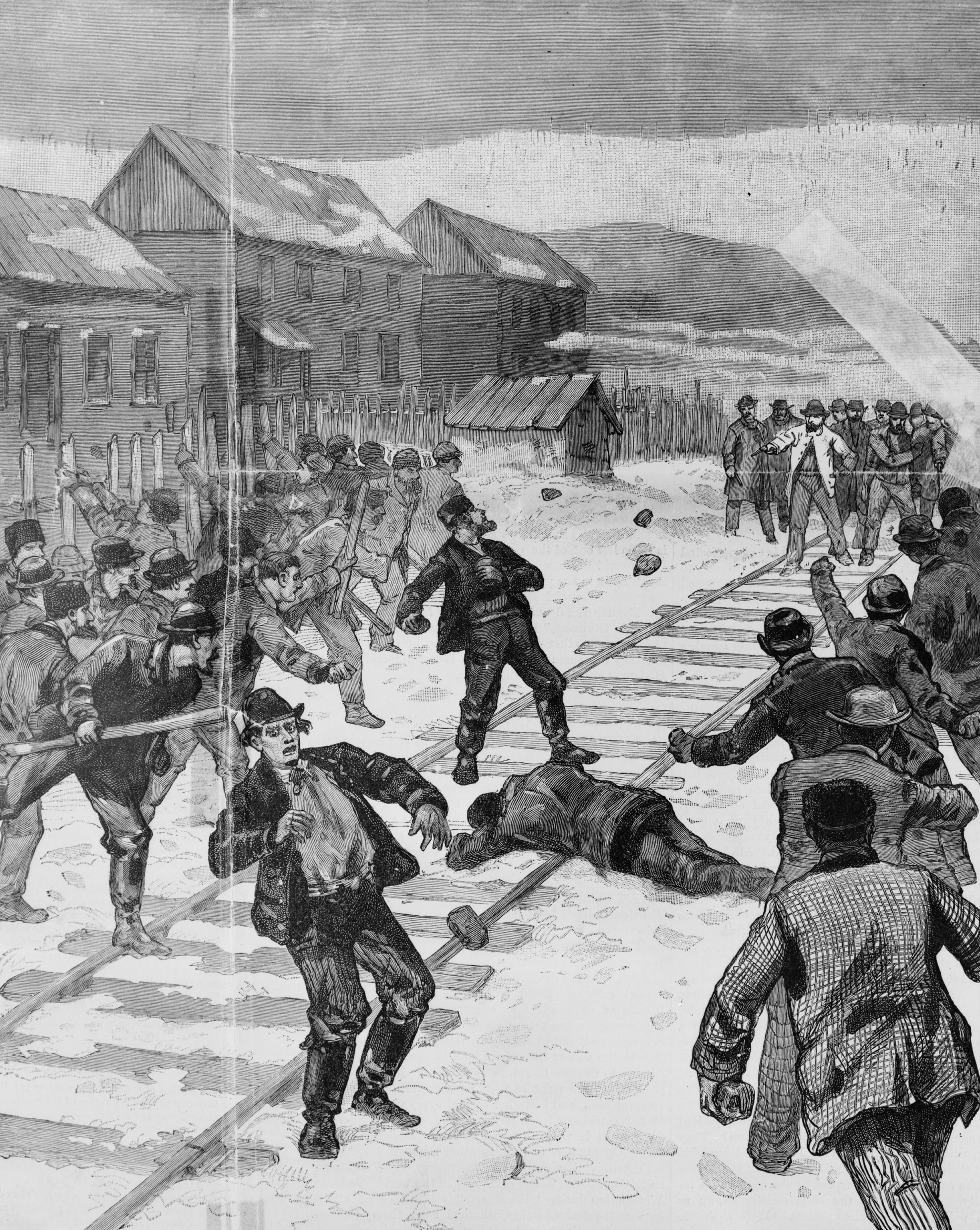
Attack on the Coal and Iron Police by a Mob of Polish Strikers, February 3rd, 1888

== Demographics ==
=== 2020 census ===
As of the 2020 census, Shenandoah had a population of 4,243.

The median age was 39.4 years. 24.9% of residents were under the age of 18 and 20.6% were age 65 or older. For every 100 females there were 88.2 males, and for every 100 females age 18 and over there were 85.3 males age 18 and over.

99.6% of residents lived in urban areas, while 0.4% lived in rural areas.

There were 1,702 households, and 1,627 occupied housing units. Non-Hispanic White alone residents made up 62.79% of the population. Of all households, 28.9% had children under the age of 18 living in them, 28.8% were married-couple households, 24.1% were households with a male householder and no spouse or partner present, and 37.4% were households with a female householder and no spouse or partner present. About 38.0% of all households were made up of individuals and 20.1% had someone living alone who was 65 years of age or older.

There were 2,429 housing units, of which 29.9% were vacant. The homeowner vacancy rate was 5.2% and the rental vacancy rate was 3.6%.

Racial composition as of the 2020 census
Race	Number	Percent
White	2,936	69.2%
Black or African American	126	3.0%
American Indian and Alaska Native	14	0.3%
Asian	14	0.3%
Native Hawaiian and Other Pacific Islander	0	0.0%
Some other race	714	16.8%
Two or more races	439	10.3%
Hispanic or Latino (of any race)	1,367	32.2%

Historical population
Census	Pop.	Note	%±
1870	2,951		—
1880	10,147		243.8%
1890	15,944		57.1%
1900	20,321		27.5%
1910	25,774		26.8%
1920	24,726		−4.1%
1930	21,782		−11.9%
1940	19,790		−9.1%
1950	15,704		−20.6%
1960	11,073		−29.5%
1970	8,287		−25.2%
1980	7,589		−8.4%
1990	6,221		−18.0%
2000	5,624		−9.6%
2010	5,071		−9.8%
2020	4,243		−16.3%
2021 (est.)	4,247	▲	0.1%

=== 2010 census ===
At the census of 2010, there were 5,071 people, 2,213 households, and 1,213 families residing in the borough. There were 3,112 housing units, with 28.9% vacant. The racial makeup of the borough was 86.3% White, 1.7% Black, 0.4% Native American, 0.3% Asian, 8.7% some other race, and 2.7% from two or more races. Hispanic or Latino of any race were 16.7% of the population.

=== 2000 census ===
At the census of 2000, there were 5,624 people, 2,649 households, and 1,380 families residing in the borough. The population density was 3,710.7 inhabitants per square mile (1,432.7/km^{2}). There were 3,339 housing units at an average density of 2,203.1 per square mile (850.6/km^{2}). The racial makeup of the borough was 97.40% White, 0.34% African American, 0.25% Native American, 0.36% Asian, 0.04% Pacific Islander, 1.01% from other races, and 0.60% from two or more races. Hispanic or Latino of any race were 2.76% of the population.

=== Demographic estimates ===
In the borough, 30.43% of the population was younger than 20 years old, 24.58% were 20 years of age through 39 years of age, 28.07% were 40 years of age through 64 years of age, and 17.98% were 65 years of age or older. The median age was 32.9 years. 33.3% of residents spoke a language other than English at home, with 30.2% speaking Spanish at home, 1.9% speaking another Indo-European language, and 1.2% speaking other languages.

=== Income and poverty ===
The median income for a household in the borough was $40,435, and the median income for families was $42,245. Married-couple families had a median income of $59,079, while nonfamily households had a median income of $27,750. The poverty rate for borough residents was approximately three times that of Pennsylvania residents generally, with 30.6% of the population falling below the poverty line, including 51.0% of those under age 18 and 18.9% of those age 65 or over.

== Transportation ==
Schuylkill Transportation System operates the #10, and 51 bus to/from Pottsville and the #52 bus to/from Ashland

There is a route in the Uptown Vans network which connects Shenandoah to Paterson, New Jersey and New York City.

== Notable people ==
- Joseph Awad – poet, painter and public relations executive. National president of the Public Relations Society of America, Poet Laureate of Virginia.
- Al Babartsky (19 April 1915 – 29 December 2002) – collegiate and professional American football player. He was one of the Seven Blocks of Granite at Fordham University.
- Celia Klemski (May 17, 1919 – October 24, 2016) - secretary for high ranking officials in the Manhattan Project.
- Francis Brennan (7 May 1894 – 2 July 1968) – the first American to receive an appointment to the Roman Curia.
- John Cavosie – National Football League player.
- Walter Ciszek – Jesuit priest and Russian GULAG survivor. Presently under consideration for possible beatification by the Roman Catholic Church and titled Servant of God.
- Anthony P. Damato – United States Marine and Medal of Honor recipient. A United States Navy Gearing-class destroyer was named in honor of Corporal Damato.
- John Morgan Davis (9 August 1906 – 8 March 1984) – Lieutenant Governor of Pennsylvania from 1959 to 1963.
- Jimmy Dorsey – jazz musician and bandleader.
- Tommy Dorsey – jazz musician and bandleader.
- Leo Katalinas – National Football League player.
- Herschel Levit – professor, artist, designer, author.
- Nicholas Marsicano- painter and teacher of the New York School.
- Ron Mattes – National Football League player.
- Al Matuza (11 September 1918 – 16 May 2004) – National Football League player.
- Rear Admiral Mary Joan Nielubowicz – Director of the United States Navy Nurse Corps.
- Darryl Ponicsan – author and screenwriter, The Last Detail, Cinderella Liberty.
- Abner Charles Powell (15 December 1860 – 7 August 1953)- professional baseball player, manager, owner and innovator.
- Frank Racis – National Football League player.
- Walter Slowakiewicz – fourth bishop of the Eastern Diocese of the Polish National Catholic Church
- Barney Wentz – National Football League player.
- Jerry Wolman - former owner of Philadelphia Eagles of NFL and Philadelphia Flyers of NHL.
- Nellie King - MLB pitcher and broadcaster for the Pittsburgh Pirates
- Ted Twardzik, founder of Mrs. T's Pierogies.
- Tim Twardzik, State Representative, Pennsylvania’s 123rd Legislative District, and co-owner of Mrs. T’s Pierogies

== Local media ==
- The Pottsville Republican – Herald, daily newspaper, name merged from the Pottsville Republican and Shenandoah Evening Herald.
- The Hazleton Standard-Speaker, daily newspaper, name merged from the Standard Sentinel (morning paper) and Plain Speaker (evening paper).
- WCDH 91.5FM, licensed to Shenandoah, with a Contemporary Christian music format.
- Locally owned WMBT 1530 on the AM dial served the community from 1963 to 2003.
- The Shenandoah Sentinel, online local newspaper.

== Education ==
The school district is Shenandoah Valley School District.

== Churches ==
St Michael Greek Catholic Church (Ruthenian Catholic Church) was first of that denomination in the United States. On 21 November 1886, the church was dedicated to Saint Michael the Archangel. The new parish was started four years earlier when a group of seventy Galician and Subcarpathian Ruthenian families gathered together and agreed to petition the Ruthenian Catholic Metropolitan of Galicia.

St. George Lithuanian Roman Catholic Church is the oldest Lithuanian parish in the United States. The Lithuanian parish was established in 1872, and the church was built in 1891. The church was demolished in 2010 by the decision of Diocese of Allentown and against the wishes of parishioners.

St. Casimir Roman Catholic Church is listed as one of the oldest Polish parishes in the United States.

== Gallery ==
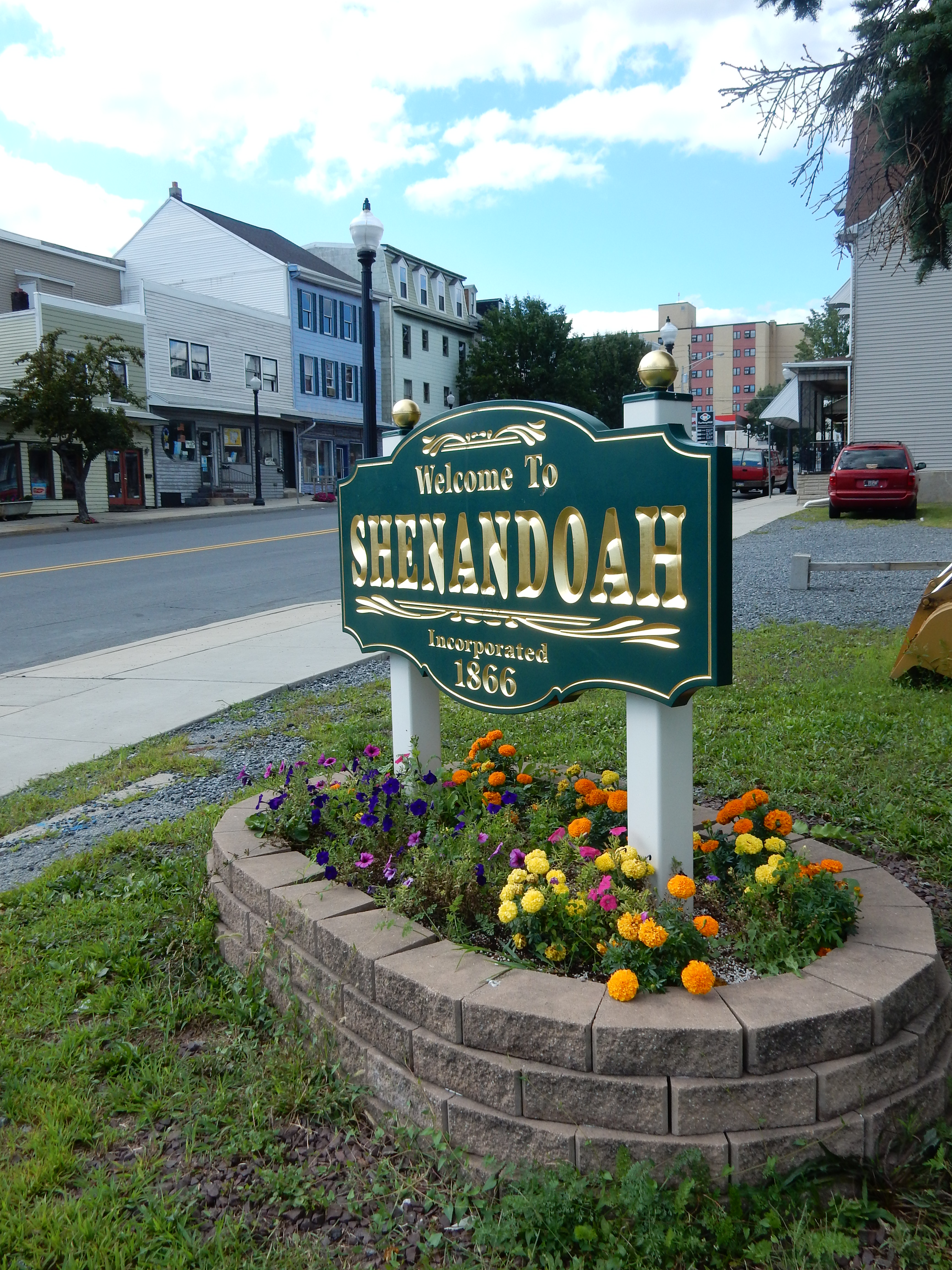
Welcome Sign on Main Street.

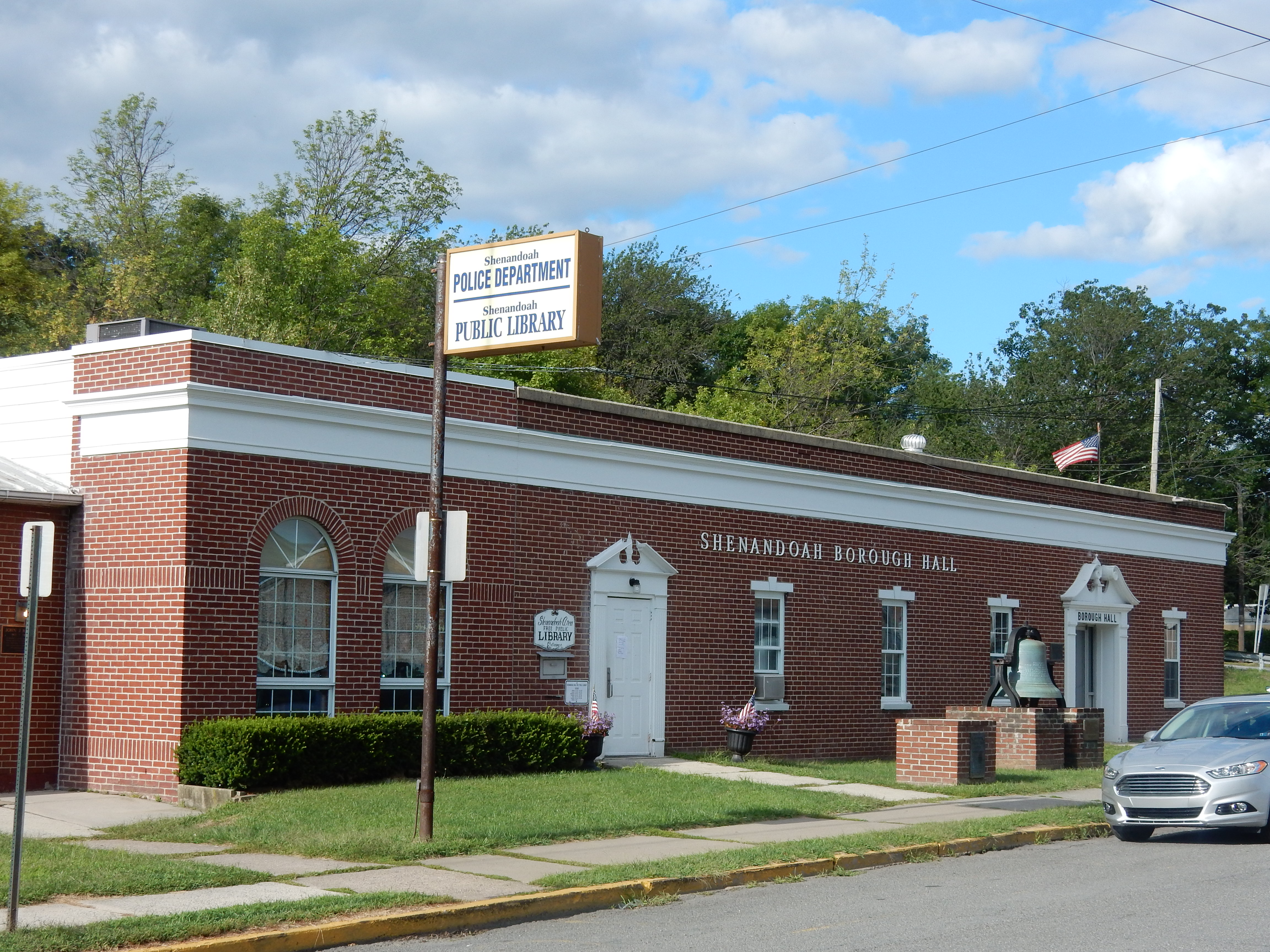
Shenandoah Borough Hall.

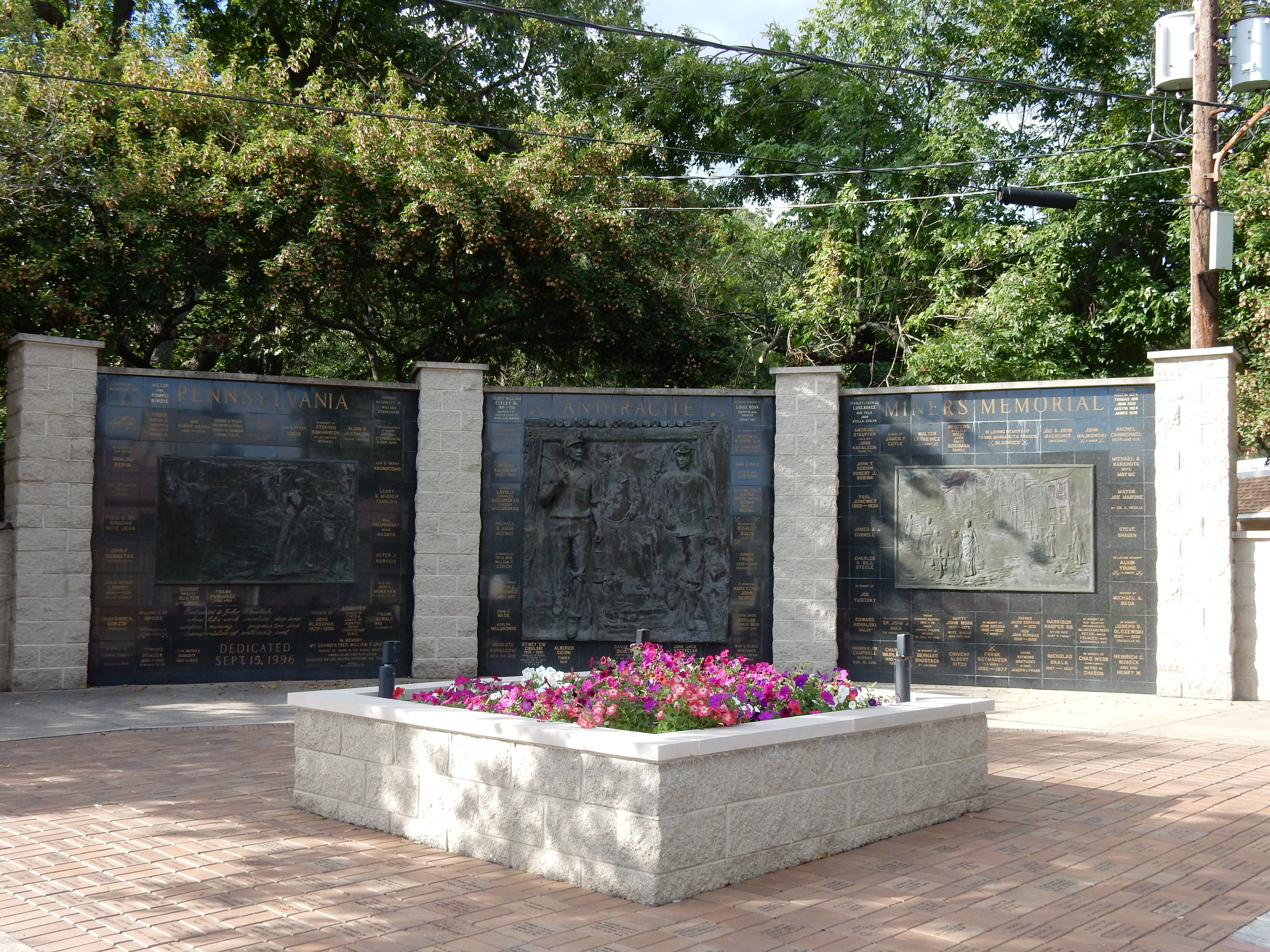
Pennsylvania Anthracite Miners Memorial.

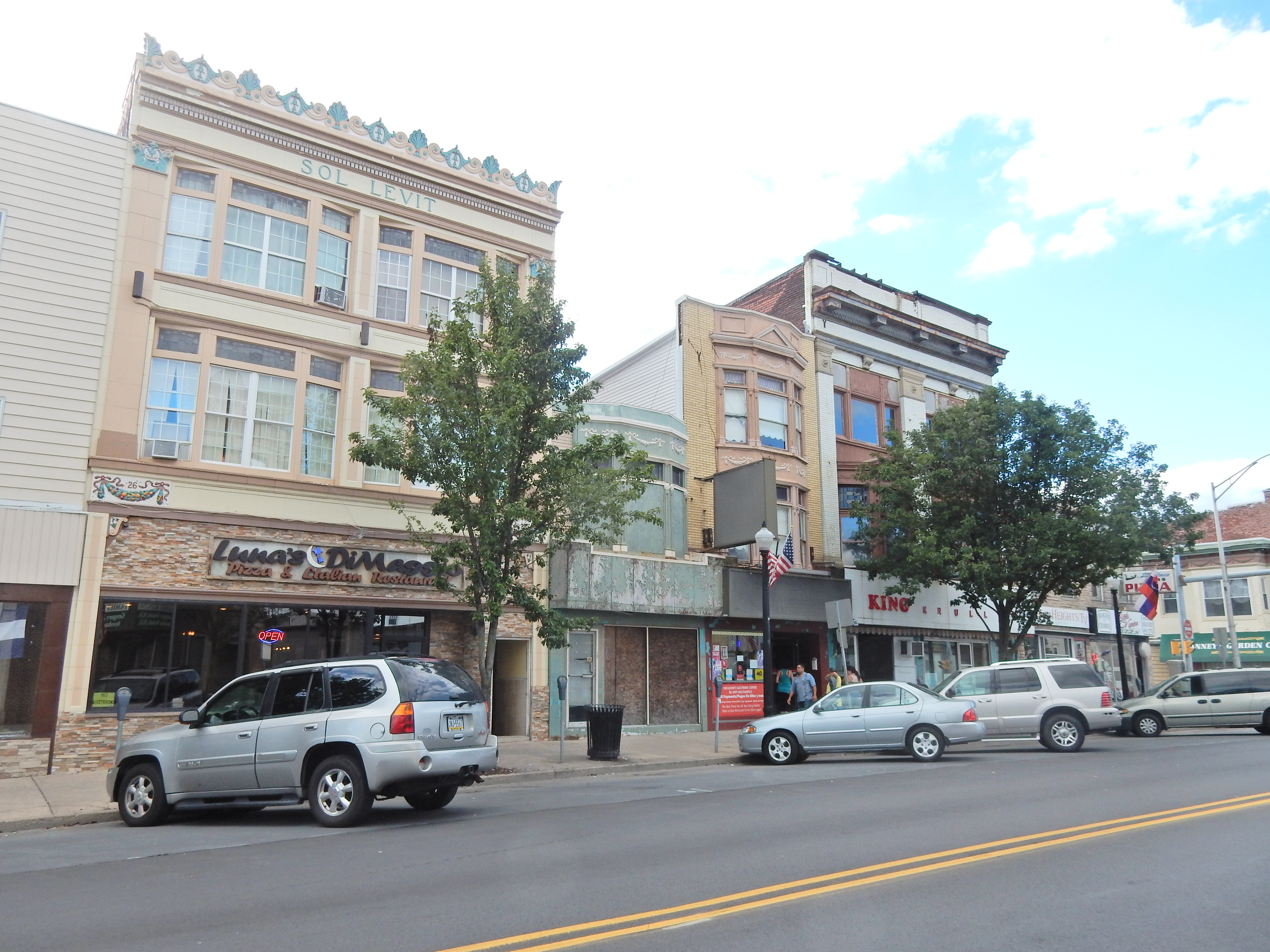
Main Street.

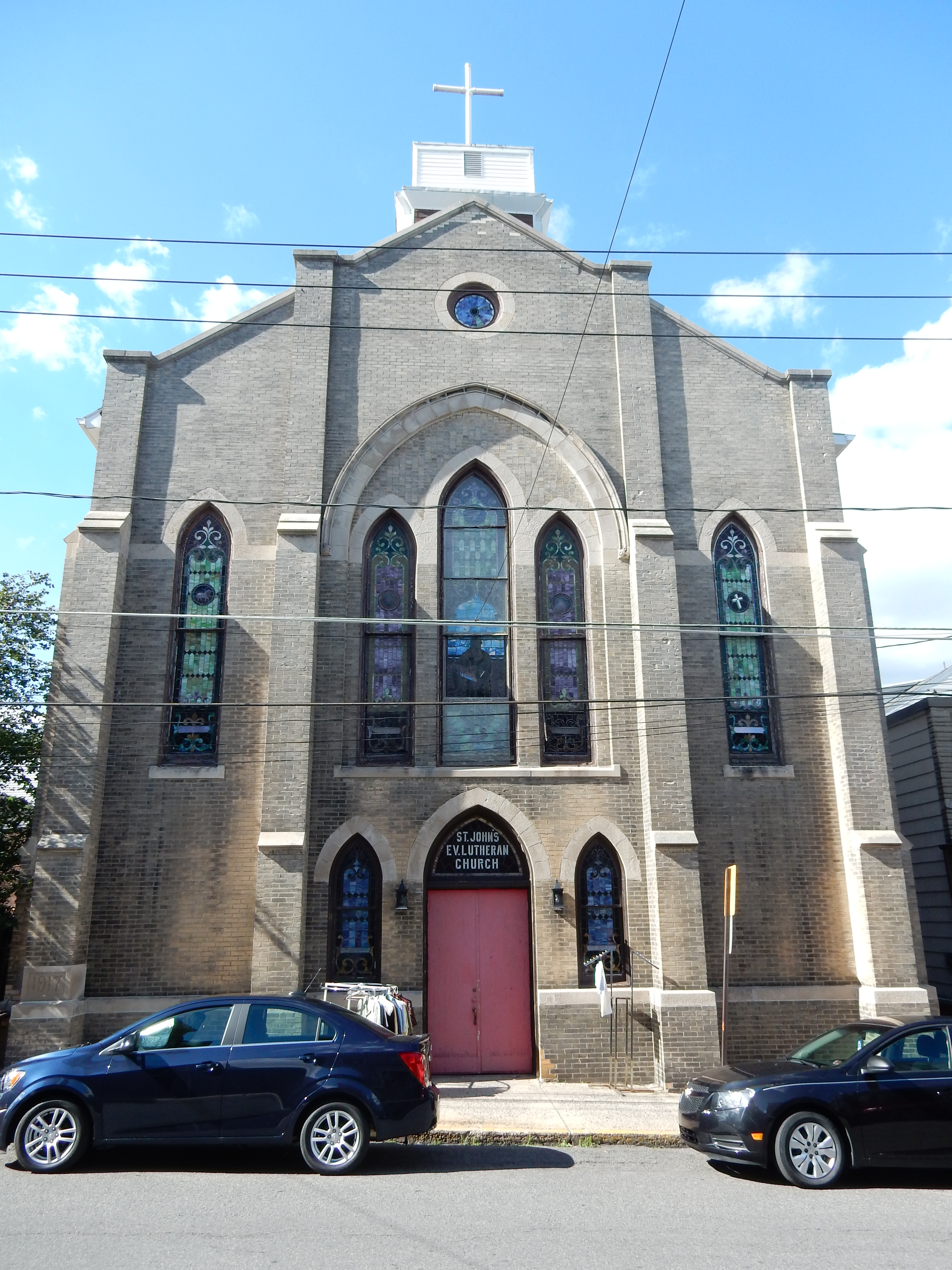
St. John's Lutheran Church.

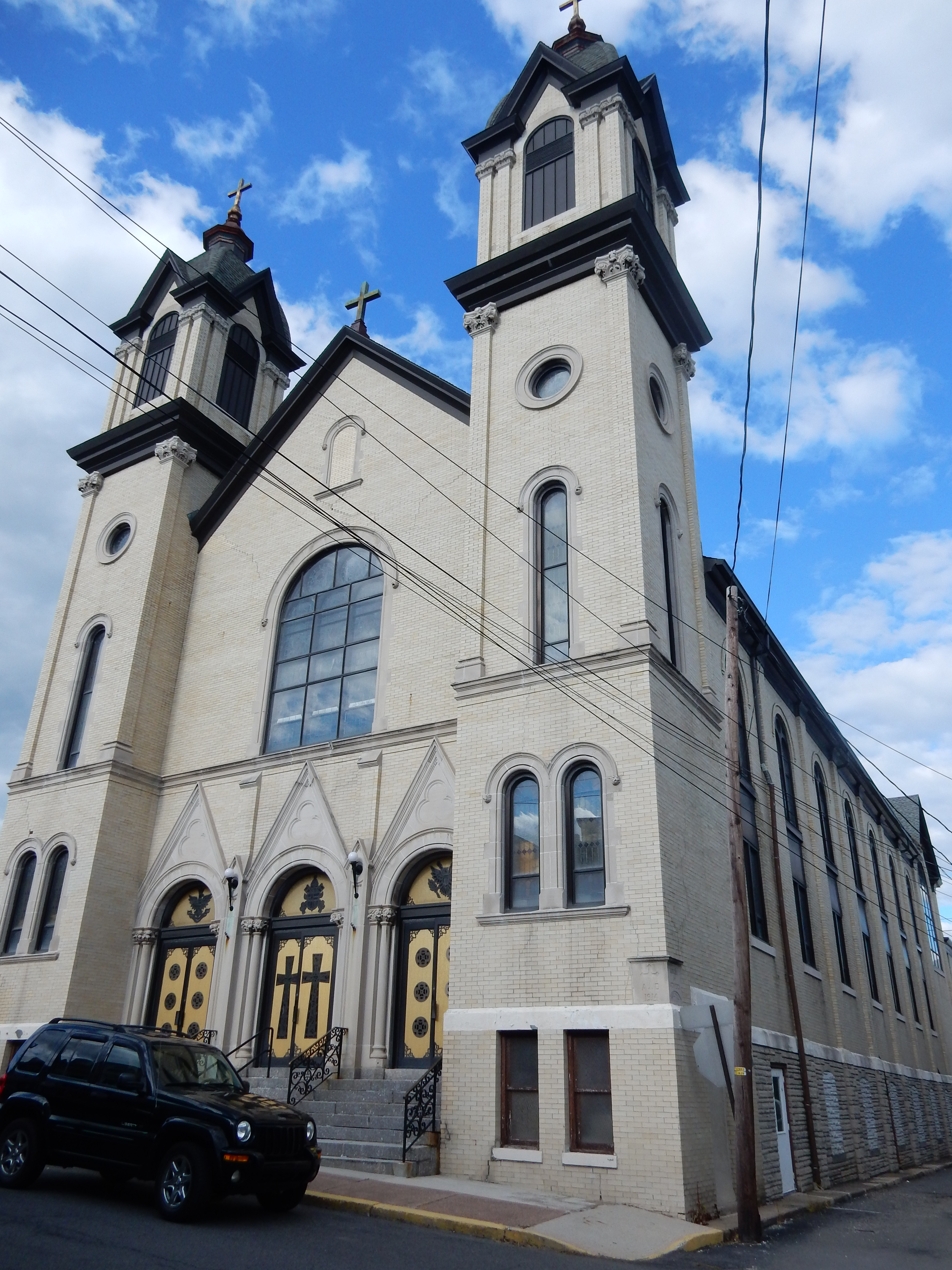
St. Casimir's Catholic Church

== See also ==
- George Bretz (photographer), who produced a famous series of underground photographs of the old Kohinoor Mine here, in 1884.
