= American darts =

Local variant of international throwing game

American Darts
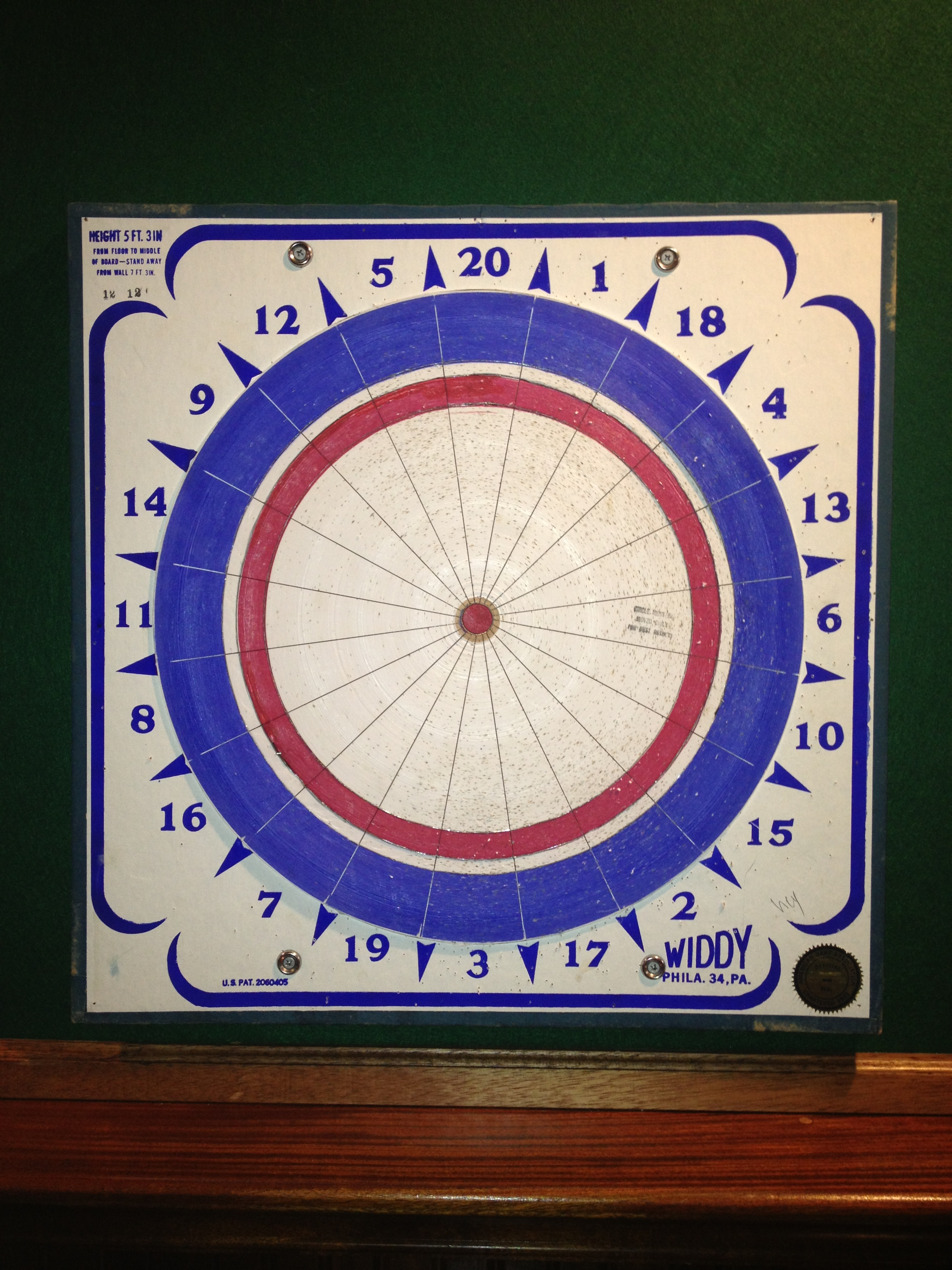
- A "Widdy" American Dart Board, located in Manasquan Beach, NJ.
- First played: Early 20th century

Characteristics
- Contact: No
- Team members: No
- Type: Indoor
- Equipment: Darts

Presence
- Country or region: Eastern Pennsylvania, New Jersey, Delaware, Maryland, and parts of New York states, U.S.

American darts is a regional variant of the game of darts, most often found in eastern Pennsylvania, New Jersey, Delaware, Maryland, and parts of New York state. American darts originated in eastern Pennsylvania in the early 20th century; this style of darts was first played in both the Philadelphia area and the Coal Region of Northeastern Pennsylvania.

Despite the name of this variant, the most common form of darts in the United States is the traditional English version.

== Dartboard ==
There are a number of differences between an American board and a traditional English board. American darts uses a board made of basswood, using the end grain. High-quality boards have rotatable centers that can be turned so the board will wear more evenly.

Embedded in the board are thin steel wires that separate the board into scoring sections, as opposed to the wider steel dividers placed onto the surface of traditional boards. On those English boards, the wider steel makes it much more likely that the dart will hit the steel divider and bounce off onto the floor. Since the dividers on an American board are much thinner, usually around 0.01 inches [0.25 mm], and they are completely pressed into the surface, it is extremely unlikely that the dart will bounce off from hitting the steel.

The scoring areas on an American darts board are also laid out differently from an English board. The center bullseye (or cork) on an American board is one section; there is no "inner" and "outer" bullseye. Additionally, unlike the English board, the treble ring is not halfway between the outer edge and the bullseye; rather triple is itself on the outer edge, and the double ring is directly adjacent to it, just inside the triple ring. The remainder of the board is the single scoring area. The bullseye is colored red, the single area is uncolored, the double ring is red, and the outermost triple ring is uncolored. The entire scoring area is bounded by a large out-of-bounds blue ring.

The number sequence (20, 1, 18, 4, etc.) is the same as on an English dart board.

== Height and distance ==
An "American" board is mounted a few inches lower, and a few inches closer, than the more commonly seen "English" board. The center of the cork is 5 ft 3 in (1.60 m) from the floor. The distance is set at 7 ft 3 in (2.21 m) from the back of the dartboard. This would result in a distance of 106.4 inches (2.70 m) from the center of the cork to the throw line. On the other hand, the ABDA (American Baseball Darts Association) sets the distance at 7 ft 3 in (2.21 m) from the front of the board. This is 107.4 inches (2.73 m) from the centre of the cork to the throw line.

== Darts ==
The darts are made of wooden barrels, fletched with turkey feather flights glued in place. A metal tip assembly is bored into the end of the wooden section. The exposed (visible) end of the tip assembly is either tempered steel or brass. The other end of the tip assembly (the section inserted inside the wood barrel) had a lead weight attached. Placing this heavier end of the metal assembly inside the wood tends to move the center of gravity away from the tip and towards the center of the dart, creating a stable flight.

Standard sized American darts are 5 3/4 inches (15 cm) long, and are known as size #1 darts. These darts weigh anywhere from 0.42 to 0.49 ounces (12 to 14 g), depending on the wood and metals used.

== General scoring rules ==
The thin wires separating the scoring sections on the board occasionally overlap slightly, due to the manufacturing process. Any dart splitting the wires (landing in the tiny area where two wires overlap) is credited in the shooter's favor. For example, if the dart splits the wires separating the two and three point zones, the player is awarded three points. If the dart splits the wires separating the three point zone and the blue ring, the player is credited with three points.

Since the shafts of the darts are made from wood, and the tips are sharpened metal, it is possible for a dart to stick into the shaft of a previously thrown dart. The scoring of any dart is determined by where the tip of the dart lands, and if the tip of a dart is not in the board, a dart that is stuck in the barrel of another scores no points at all. It is considered the same as if it missed the board.

== Etiquette ==
One notable etiquette difference from traditional "English" style darts is that in American darts, each player leaves the thrown darts in the board for the next player, rather than retrieving them.

This is done for several practical reasons:

- In nearly all settings, a shared set of darts is used, rather than every competitor having their own darts. So if you were to retrieve the darts you just threw, all you would then do is immediately hand them to the next player. With that in mind, it is simply quicker for the incoming shooter to remove the darts from the board, rather than the awkward process of the preceding shooter removing them, then (carefully) passing a handful of three sharpened steel darts to the next player.
- The next player can view and verify the score of the preceding player. This eliminates the need for a scorekeeper to stand near the board.
- Dart maintenance supplies for moistening the dart tips (e.g., a potato, a sharpening stone, etc.) are often kept at the board, requiring every player to go the board before they throw, rather than after. This allows the player to more quickly prepare the darts to their liking.

== Games ==
=== Baseball ===
The standard game is Baseball (also known as "1 to 9"). Players take turns shooting three darts at each inning. They begin with inning number one and continue in order until they have shot nine innings. Darts landing in the thin uncolored outermost ring are worth 3 points. The red ring is worth 2 points, and the inside area is worth 1 point. Darts landing in the bullseye are worth zero. Also, any dart landing outside the triple ring do not score (the large blue ring beyond the treble ring is merely the out-of-boards marker, and is not a scoring area).

The maximum score in each inning is nine points—all three darts landing in the three-point area. A perfect game in Baseball would be a score of 81. This would consist of 27 consecutive darts (over nine innings), all landing in the three-point zone. This has never been achieved. The highest known score shot in tournament play is 72.

Recreational shooters will average around 20 points in a game. Regular shooters will score in the low 30s, competitive league shooters will average in the upper 30's to lower 40's, and the best shooters will average in the upper 40s to 50s. Of course, single game scores can be much higher (see the 72 mentioned above).

If the game is tied at the end of nine innings, extra innings are shot to determine the winner, starting with inning ten.

Some regional variations in scoring for Baseball exist. In the most common variation, the competitors mutually agree to a minimum required score per frame. For example, if the agreed minimum score is five, if the shooter or the team does not score at least five points for the number, the shooter or team receives no points for that frame. Generally, the greater the number of shooters on a team, the higher the minimum score per frame required.

The American Baseball Darts Association presides over the largest American dart tournaments. This includes the annual Pennsylvania State Dart Tournament, the largest American Darts event.

==== Team Game of Baseball ====
In a team game of Baseball, the arrangement of the lineup matters and can impact the result. Careful consideration is required to choose the order of a team's players. For example, in a 5 vs. 5 team game of baseball, the best shooters will often go last. It is also common for the second or third-best shooter to go first. A common order for a team of 5 would be:

1. "Opener" or "Vanguard Shooter": the shooter that goes first. This person is usually the 2nd or 3rd best player on the team. They serve as a tone-setter and are expected to be consistent and create a rhythm for the rest of the team to follow.

2-3: "Middle Shooters": These shooters tend to be more average and less consistent. Their role is to maintain the momentum created by the opener and contribute as many runs as possible.

4: "Set-Up Shooter": Often the 2nd or 3rd best player. They tend to score higher than most players and shoot with a good level of consistency. They typically stabilize the team's scoring performance and can help the team catch up if earlier shooters didn't score as much as expected.

5: "Ringer", "Anchor" or "Closing Shooter": The last shooter is often the best or 2nd best shooter on the team. This allows the best shooters to close out innings in order to maximize the score and secure a lead or catch up if the team is behind. The Ringer is also chosen based on their ability to handle close games and high-pressure situations.

=== Strikeout ===
Strikeout is a common game played in the region, but can be played just as easily on a traditional board as on an American Style board. The game is for individual players or teams.

To start, each team throws one dart at the cork (or bullseye). Whichever team is closest to the center shoots first, the next closest team will shoot second, etc.

The first player shoots three darts, scoring the in standard "traditional" manner. Thus, a triple 20 is worth sixty points, a double 9 is worth eighteen points, a single 11 is worth eleven points, and so on. The center cork is worth 100 points. Players attempt to accumulate as many points as possible with their three darts. If playing as a team, the teammates shoot in sequence, with their individual scores added together to get their team score.

The key rule of Strikeout is that the first dart to land in the 20-number scoring area sets that shooter's "number" for the remainder of the inning. Once that number is set, that number is the only number that can be scored for the remainder of the inning (with the exception of the center cork, which is always in play, regardless of the set "number"); the other nineteen numbers on the board are worth zero points for the remainder of the shooter's inning. So if a player throws his or her first dart at 20, in order to score the maximum possible points, but he or she misses and it lands in the 1 area, that player has established 1 as their number for their second and third darts. Thus, even if the last two darts were to land in 20, they would be scored as zero. Once a player establishes a poor number, the best strategy for the remainder of the inning is to just shoot at the 100-point cork, since even three darts in triple 1 would score only nine points. If the first dart does not land in one of the 20 scoring numbers (either misses the board completely, or hits the 100-point cork), the "number" is not yet established for that inning, and the shooter is still free to score in any of the 20 numbers on the second dart (likewise for the third dart, if both the first two darts do not land in any of the 20 numbers).

Since the first dart sets the number, players will sometimes shun shooting at the 20, since a small miss will result in either a 1 or a 5 being set as the number. Often two adjacent numbers with solid values, such as 11/14 and 10/15 are chosen by lower-skilled players, since a small miss there does not result is such a large penalty (if you miss the 14 you'll still land in the 11, etc.).

The maximum score in an inning is 300 points (3 corks). The maximum score for a team (two players) is 600 points. Corks and scoring numbers can be combined; for instance, if a player shoots a double 20, a cork, and a single 20, that player would score 160 points (40 + 100 + 20). If a player shoots a single 20, a double 5, and a single 20, that player would score 40 points (20 + 0 + 20), since the dart in the 5 would not count (20 having been established as the "number" for that inning).

The name Strikeout comes from the method of eliminating players/teams. Once a player/team has finished shooting, their score is the target for the next team. The next team must beat the score established by the previous team (ties count as failing to beat the score). So if the first team scores 180 points, the next team must score at least 181 points. If they do not, they are given a strike, as in baseball. Once a team accumulates three strikes, they are eliminated from the game. The last team remaining is the winner.

Example 3-team game:

- Team 1 scores 180 points
- Team 2 scores 140 points (Strike One)
- Team 3 scores 82 points (Strike One)
- Team 1 scores 100 points
- Team 2 scores 120 points
- Team 3 scores 120 points (Strike Two, since a tie does not beat the prior team's score)
- Team 1 scores 160 points
- Team 2 scores 240 points
- Team 3 scores 185 points (Strike Three, eliminated)
- Team 1 scores 140 points (Strike One)
- Team 2 scores 160 points
- Team 1 scores 161 points
- Team 2 scores 160 points (Strike Two)
- Team 1 scores 140 points (Strike Two)
- Team 2 scores 220 points
- Team 1 scores 180 points (Strike Three, eliminated)

Team 2 is the winner

== Regional & Local Dart Leagues ==
The American Baseball Dart Association hosts highly competitive American Darts leagues and tournaments across various locations. This includes the Annual PA State Dart Tournament which has been held for more than 50 years.

American Dart League of Brooklyn is a competitive American Dart League in Borough Park. Based in Brooklyn, NY.

The Bristol Borough American Dart League (BBADL) is a local competitive American Darts league in Bristol, Pennsylvania. Based in Bucks County, PA.

The Delco Invitational Dart League (DIDL) is a local competitive American Darts league. Based in Delaware County, PA.

The Mountaintop Pub & Eatery frequently hosts dart leagues and dart tournaments in Mountain Top, PA.
