= USS Damato =

Gearing-class destroyer

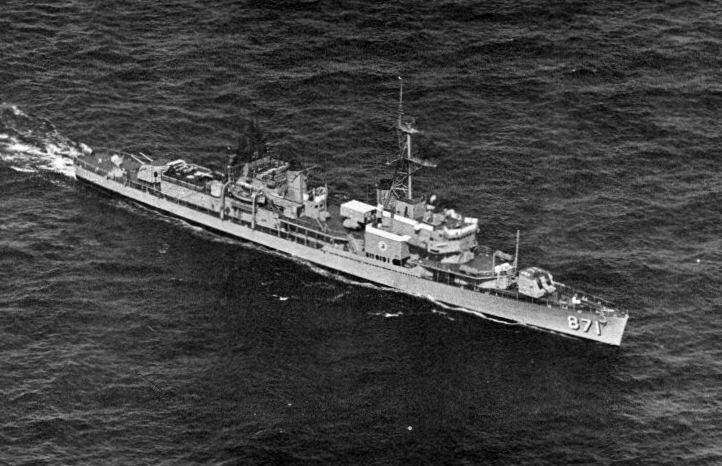
- USS Damato (DD-871) off South America, in 1968

History

United States
- Name: USS Damato
- Namesake: Anthony P. Damato
- Builder: Bethlehem Mariners Harbor, Staten Island
- Laid down: 10 May 1945
- Launched: 21 November 1945
- Commissioned: 27 April 1946
- Decommissioned: 30 September 1980
- Stricken: 1 October 1980
- Identification: Callsign: NBHC; Hull number: DD-871
- Fate: Transferred to Pakistan

Pakistan
- Name: Tippu Sultan
- Namesake: Tipu Sultan
- Fate: Scrapped, 1994

General characteristics (as built)
- Class & type: Gearing-class destroyer
- Displacement: 2,616 tons standard; 3,460 tons full load
- Length: 390.5 ft (119.0 m)
- Beam: 40.9 ft (12.5 m)
- Draught: 14.3 ft (4.4 m)
- Propulsion: 2 shaft; General Electric steam turbines; 4 boilers; 60,000 shp
- Speed: 36.8 knots (68.2 km/h)
- Range: 4,500 nmi (8,330 km) at 20 knots (37 km/h)
- Armament: 6 × 5 in /38 cal guns (3×2) guided by a Mark 37 Gun Fire Control System with a Mk25 fire control radar linked by a Mark 1A Fire Control Computer stabilized by a Mk6 8,500 rpm gyro.; 12 × 40 mm Bofors gun (2×2, 2×4); 16 × 20 mm Oerlikon cannon; 10 × 21-inch torpedo tubes

USS Damato (DD-871) was a Gearing-class destroyer of the United States Navy. She was named for Corporal Anthony P. Damato USMC (1922–1944), who was killed in action during the Battle of Eniwetok in the Marshall Islands and posthumously awarded the Medal of Honor.

Damato was laid down by the Bethlehem Steel Corporation at Staten Island in New York on 10 May 1945, launched on 21 November 1945 by Mrs. A. P. Damato and commissioned on 27 April 1946.

== History ==
=== 1947-1962 ===
From her home port at Newport, Rhode Island, and after December 1947, from Norfolk, Virginia, Damato cruised the Atlantic Ocean from Cuba to Newfoundland in training and exercises. In the summer of 1949 she carried midshipmen on a training cruise to France and England, and that fall joined in experimental cold-weather operations in Arctic waters.

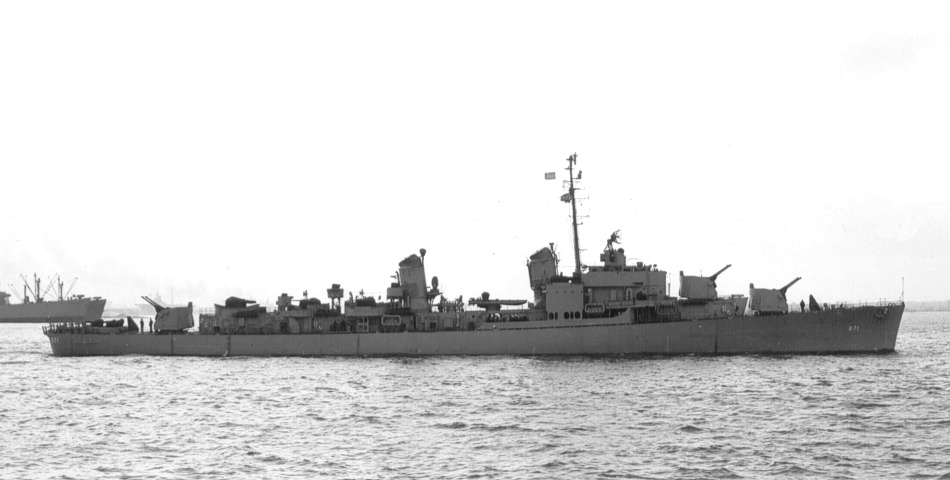
Damato in 1946.

From September to November 1950, Damato had her first tour of duty with the 6th Fleet in the Mediterranean Sea, and during the next year joined in hunter-killer operations in the South Atlantic. She was reclassified DDE-871 on 4 March 1951. She returned to the Mediterranean in the fall of 1951, the summers of 1952, 1953, and 1954. In both 1952 and 1953, she joined in autumn North Atlantic Treaty Organization exercises in the North Atlantic and during the summer of 1955 joined a Midshipman Training Cruise to Norway and Sweden.

Between October and December 1956, she served with the 6th Fleet in the Mediterranean, and on 12 June 1957 was in Hampton Roads for the International Naval Review. That summer she cruised to Brazil with midshipmen on board for training, then sailed for the Mediterranean in March 1958. She patrolled off the Levant, then passed through the Suez Canal to join the Middle East Force in the Persian Gulf, returning to Norfolk for local operations in September. During 1959 she served with Task Force "Alfa," concentrating on the development of improved antisubmarine warfare techniques. She visited Quebec, Canada, in July, and in August sailed north again to pass through the St. Lawrence Seaway, dedicated a month previously. She called at Montréal, at Rochester, New York, and arrived at Toronto for the Canadian National Exhibition, joining in the review of NATO naval forces taken by Admiral of the Fleet, the Earl Mountbatten of Burma, Britain's senior military officer. Returning home, Damato called at Ogdensburg, New York, and resumed east coast and Caribbean operations through 1962.

=== 1963-1980 ===
In 1963, Damato entered the Norfolk Naval Shipyard and underwent the FRAM I modernization until February 1964 and was reclassified DD-871. Damato then alternated operations along the east coast and in the Caribbean with the 2nd Fleet with deployments to the Mediterranean with the 6th Fleet. Damato served with the Pacific Fleet from June 1967 until February 1968. On 12 and 13 December 1967, Damato conducted naval gunfire support (NGFS) missions while in the Saigon River and has been placed on the US Veterans Administration list of vessels exposed to agent orange thereby making her crew at that time potentially eligible for certain VA benefits. Damato was decommissioned in September 1970, and approximately 40% of her officers and crew were transferred and she became of source of spare parts for other ships. Then in November 1970, a decision was made to see how quickly a decommissioned ship could be placed back into combat ready service. Sailors began arriving on board and Damato made a brief trip to Newport to cannibalize another ship then had a brief dry-dock session in Portsmouth. Damato set sail in January 1971 for Guantanamo Bay, Cuba for combat readiness testing. She passed with flying colors and was sent to the Mediterranean to serve with the 6th Fleet. While there, Damato spent several days monitoring the activity of a Soviet cruiser off the coast of Libya and managed to shadow and surface a Soviet submarine among other accomplishments. Damato received commendations for its combat readiness while in the Mediterranean. Upon returning to Norfolk, VA, it set sail again for the North Atlantic on the western coast of Europe to participate in NATO exercises as a show of force toward the Soviet Union. In 1972 she underwent overhaul in the Bath, ME, shipyard and was then transferred to the reserve fleet operating out of Newport Rhode Island. In 1975 she cruised from Boston to Halifax NS with Boston-area based reservists on board. In 1976 she participated in Bi-Centennial exercises along the Atlantic coast w/ "replenishment" ports-of-call incl. Brunswick, GA and Freeport, Bahamas. She was decommissioned on 30 September 1980 and stricken from the Naval Vessel Register.

=== Pakistan service ===
Damato was transferred to Pakistan as Tippu Sultan, on 1 October 1980 and scrapped in 1994.
