= Celia Klemski =

American government secretary (1919–2016)

- Born: May 17, 1919; Shenandoah, Pennsylvania, United States
- Died: October 24, 2016 (aged 97); Greenfield Senior Living
- Occupation: Secretary

Celia Szapka Klemski (May 17, 1919 – October 24, 2016) was a secretary for the State Department and the Manhattan Project. She was also featured in The Girls of Atomic City.

== Early life and career ==
Celia Klemski was born in Shenandoah, Pennsylvania on May 17, 1919. Her father was a coal miner.

In 1938, Klemski moved to Washington, District of Columbia to work as a secretary for the State Department. In 1942, Klemski moved to New York City to work as a secretary for the Manhattan Project. In 1943, Klemski moved to Oak Ridge, only being told it was a secret city. Klemski worked at the administrative headquarters of the Manhattan Project, called Site X, taking encoded and unencoded orders from generals. Klemski's first boss was Colonel Vanderbook. At one point Klemski took an order from a person people in the office called "G. G.", being General Leslie Groves. Despite working closely with high-ranking people, Klemski didn't know what Site X was doing, only that it helped with the war effort. Two of her brothers were in the military and she wanted to "do her part to bring them home."

She died on October 24, 2016.
