= John Cavosie =

American football player (1908–1995)

Profile
- Position: Fullback

Personal information
- Born: January 6, 1908; Shenandoah, Pennsylvania
- Died: March 16, 1995 (aged 87)
- Listed height: 6 ft 0 in (1.83 m)
- Listed weight: 207 lb (94 kg)

Career information
- College: Wisconsin

Career statistics
- Rushing attempts: 69
- Rushing yards: 192
- Receptions: 6
- Pass attempts: 15
- Pass completions: 6
- Touchdowns: 5
- Stats at Pro Football Reference

John Cavosie (January 6, 1908 – March 16, 1995) was an American football player. He played as a fullback for the Portsmouth Spartans in the National Football League. He was active in the league from 1931 to 1933, having a career spanning only 3 seasons.
