= Clarence E. Sutton =

United States Marine Corps Medal of Honor recipient

Clarence Edwin Sutton
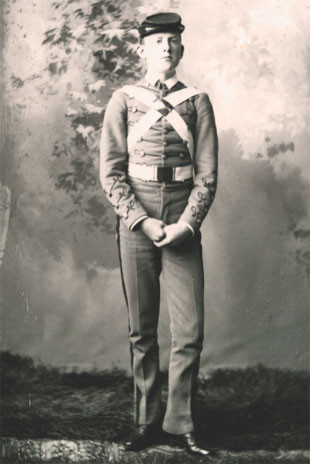
- Sutton as a cadet at the Virginia Military Institute in 1886
- Born: February 18, 1871; Urbanna, Virginia, U.S.
- Died: October 9, 1916 (aged 45); Washington, D.C., U.S.
- Burial place: Arlington National Cemetery
- Military career
- Allegiance: United States of America
- Branch: United States Marine Corps
- Service years: 1899–1909
- Rank: First Sergeant
- Conflicts: Philippine–American War; Boxer Rebellion; Battle of Tientsin
- Awards: Medal of Honor

Clarence Edwin Sutton (February 18, 1871 – October 9, 1916) was a United States Marine Corps sergeant who received the Medal of Honor for his actions during the Boxer Rebellion.

== Biography ==
Sutton was born in Urbanna, Virginia, on February 18, 1871, the oldest of four children of Thomas E. and Ellen Sutton. His father Thomas worked as a merchant. Sutton entered the Virginia Military Institute on August 18, 1885. He was forced to repeat his first year there, becoming a member of the class of 1890, and resigned from the school in 1888 before graduating.

Sutton joined the Marine Corps from Washington, D.C. in June 1899, and served in the Philippine–American War. By July 13, 1900, he had reached the rank of sergeant and was serving in Tianjin (then known to Americans as "Tientsin"), China, in the midst of the Boxer Rebellion.

Sutton resigned from the military in about 1909 due to illness, after reaching the rank of first sergeant. He died seven years later on October 9, 1916, at age 45 and was buried in site 18847 section 17, at Arlington National Cemetery in Arlington County, Virginia.

== War ==
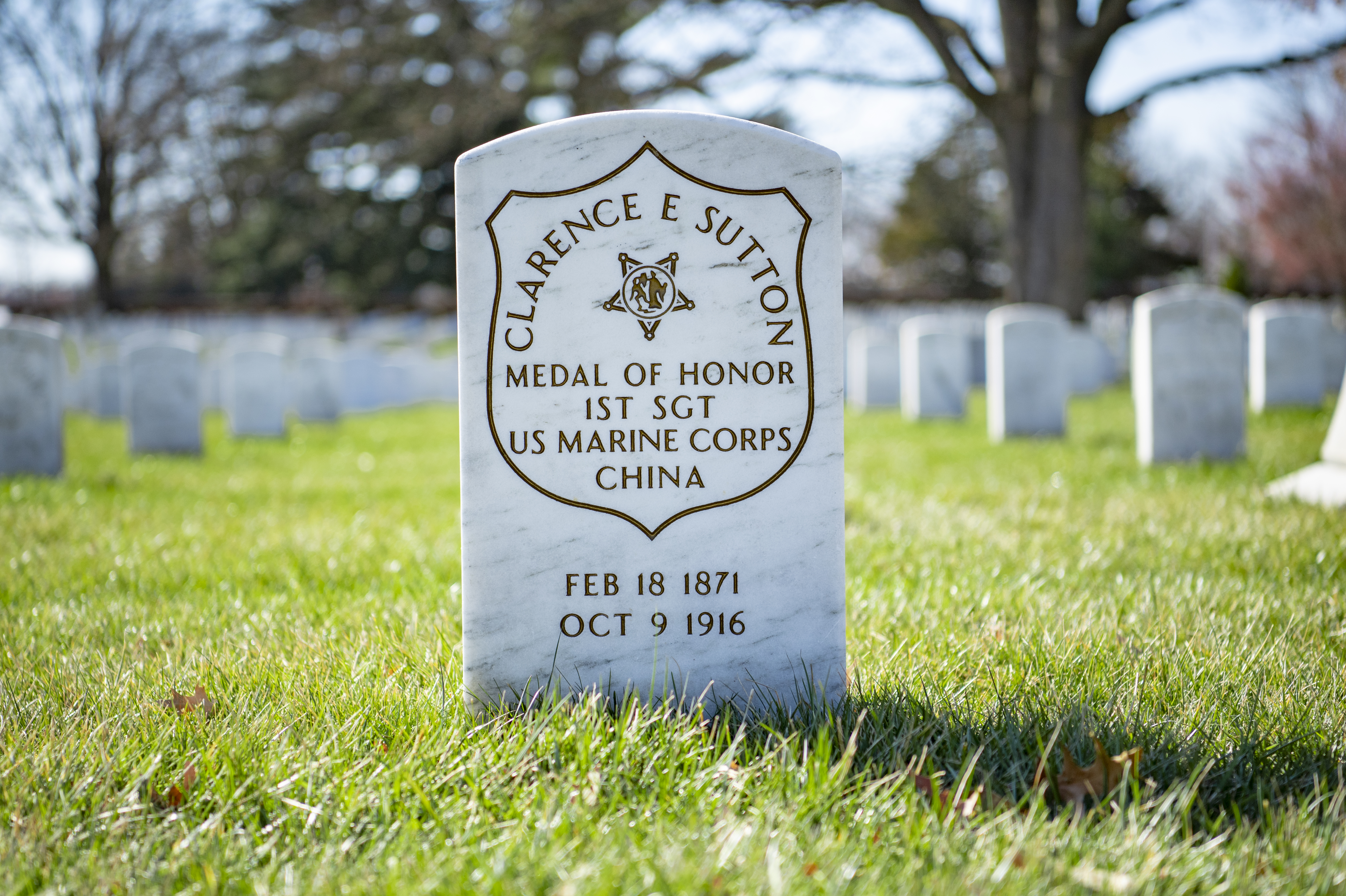
Grave at Arlington National Cemetery

The small garrison of Marines stationed in Tientsin found themselves under attack and outnumbered by the nationalists (boxers), who were determined to "drive the foreign devils" out. A multinational military force from the Eight-Nation Alliance whose members were Austria-Hungary, France, Germany, Italy, Japan, Russia, the United Kingdom, and the United States consisting of 50,000 troops were sent to Tientsin to reinforce the troops already there.

On June 21, 1900, the Boxers were entrenched on the outskirts of Tientsin. On July 13, 1900, a major skirmish occurred between Sutton's unit, the First U.S. Infantry Regiment, and the Boxers. Major James Regan was badly wounded and Sutton together with Sergeant Alexander J. Foley and two other Marines, under enemy fire and in total disregard for their personal safety, rescued the Major. They were able to take Maj Regan to a field hospital three miles away from the location where he was wounded. In the letter which Major Regan wrote recommending the Medal of Honor, he stated the following:

It was with the greatest of difficulty and persistence in their noble work that they got me off the field. They placed me on an improvised litter made of two flannel shirts and two rifles. I was a heavy man and with the greatest of care over the roughest kind of ground, under fire, they carried me to the Marine Hospital in the city, a distance of about three miles....Such men are worthy of all the distinction the Government can confer upon them.

After serving in the Boxer Rebellion, Sutton and Foley were sent to the Marine garrison located in Cavite, in the Philippine Islands. There, on May 11, 1902, in the presence of their units, they were each bestowed with the Medal of Honor.

The two other Marines were also awarded the Medal of Honor.

== Medal of Honor citation ==
Rank and organization: Sergeant, U.S. Marine Corps. Born: 18 February 1871, Middlesex County, Va. Accredited to: Washington, D.C. G.O. No.: 55, 19 July 1901.

Citation:

In action during the battle near Tientsin, China, 13 July 1900. Although under heavy fire from the enemy, Sutton assisted in carrying a wounded officer from the field of battle.

== Awards and recognitions ==
Among Sutton's decorations and medals were the following:

Medal of Honor

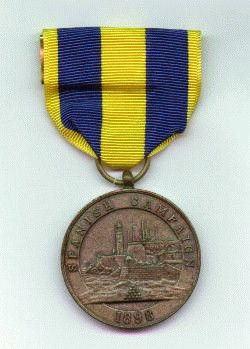
Spanish Campaign Medal

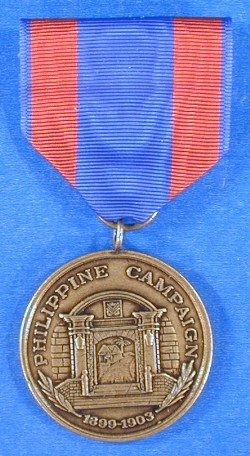
Philippine Campaign Medal

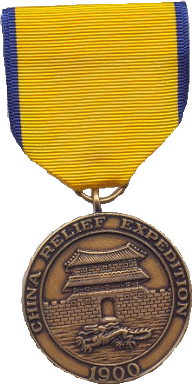
China Relief Expedition Medal

== See also ==
- Virginia Military Institute
- List of Medal of Honor recipients for the Boxer Rebellion
