= Alexander J. Foley =

United States Marine Corps Medal of Honor recipient

Alexander Joseph Foley
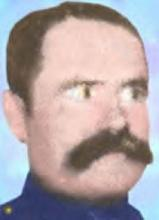
- Sergeant Alexander Joseph Foley
- Born: February 19, 1866; Heckscherville, Pennsylvania
- Died: January 14, 1910 (aged 43); Culebra, Puerto Rico
- Burial place: Culebra Municipal Cemetery in Culebra, Puerto Rico
- Military career
- Allegiance: United States of America
- Branch: United States Marine Corps
- Service years: 1888–1910
- Rank: First Sergeant
- Units: 1st Regiment, Ninth U.S. Infantry
- Conflicts: Spanish–American War; Philippine Campaign; Boxer Rebellion
- Awards: Medal of Honor

Sergeant Alexander Joseph Foley (February 19, 1866 – January 14, 1910) was a member of the United States Marine Corps who was awarded the United States' highest military decoration, the Medal of Honor, for having distinguished himself during the Boxer Rebellion.

== Early years ==
Foley was born in Heckscherville, Pennsylvania to Irish immigrants, Edward and Catherine McDonald Foley. At a young age he decided that he was not going to work the coal mines as his father had done. He joined the United States Marine Corps in 1888 for a period of five years. In 1893, he re-enlisted and, in 1898, he was sent to Cuba during the Spanish–American War where he received his first taste of military action. He also participated in the Philippines Campaign.

== Boxer Rebellion ==
In 1900, members of a Chinese nationalist society, known as the Righteous Harmony Society or in contemporary English parlance, "Boxers", resented the presence of Western foreigners and Chinese Christians on their soil and proceeded to attack them. This became known as the Boxer Rebellion. Hundreds of foreigners were murdered. The British Legation at Peking was under siege for two months and soon after the international settlement at Tientsin was also placed under siege by the Boxers. The small garrison of Marines stationed in Tientsin found themselves under attack and outnumbered by the nationalists, who were determined to "drive the foreign devils" out. A multinational military force from the Eight-Nation Alliance whose members were Austria-Hungary, France, Germany, Italy, Japan, Russia, the United Kingdom, and the United States and consisting of 50,000 troops were sent to Tientsin to reinforce the troops already there.

On June 21, 1900, the Boxers were entrenched on the outskirts of Tientsin. On July 13, 1900, a major skirmish occurred between Foley's unit, the Ninth U.S. Infantry, and the Boxers. Major James Regan was badly wounded and Foley together with Sergeant Clarence Edwin Sutton and two other Marines, under enemy fire and in total disregard for their own personal safety, rescued the Major. They were able to take Maj Regan to a field hospital three miles away from the location where he was wounded. In the letter which Major Regan wrote recommending the Medal of Honor, he stated the following:

It was with the greatest of difficulty and persistence in their noble work that they got me off the field. They placed me on an improvised litter made of two flannel shirts and two rifles. I was a heavy man and with the greatest of care over the roughest kind of ground, under fire, they carried me to the Marine Hospital in the city, a distance of about three miles.... Such men are worthy of all the distinction the Government can confer upon them.

After serving in the Boxer Rebellion, Foley was sent to the Marine garrison located in Cavite, in the Philippine Islands. There, on May 11, 1902, in the presence of his unit, he was bestowed with the Medal of Honor.

Sergeant Sutton and the two other Marines were also awarded the Medal of Honor.

== Medal of Honor citation ==

FOLEY, ALEXANDER J.

Rank and organization: Sergeant, U.S. Marine Corps.
Date: July 19, 1901.
G.O. Navy Department, No.55
Citation: In the presence of the enemy in the battle near Tientsin, China, July 13, 1900, Foley distinguished himself by meritorious conduct.

== Puerto Rico ==
Foley was reassigned to the Culebra Naval Station located on the island of Culebra, Puerto Rico. On January 14, 1910, Sgt. Alexander J. Foley suffered a heart attack and died at the age of 44. The Department of the Navy did not consider it practical at that time to transfer his body to his hometown, therefore Foley was buried in the municipal cemetery of Culebra, with flags at half mast and with full military honors.

== Awards and recognitions ==
Among Alexander J. Foley's decorations and medals were the following:

Medal of Honor

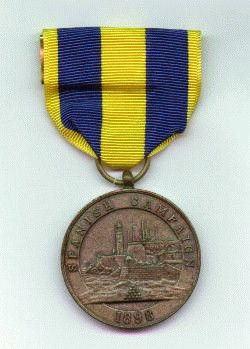
Spanish Campaign Medal

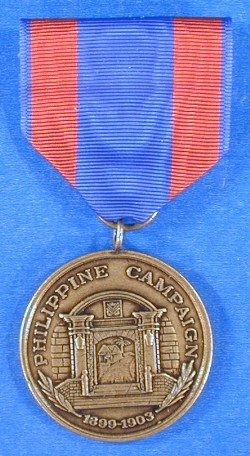
Philippine Campaign Medal

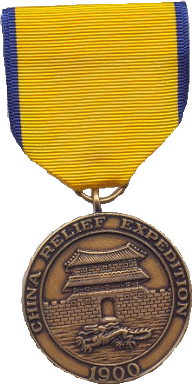
China Relief Expedition Medal

== See also ==
- List of Medal of Honor recipients
