= Coal Region =

Subregion in Pennsylvania, United States

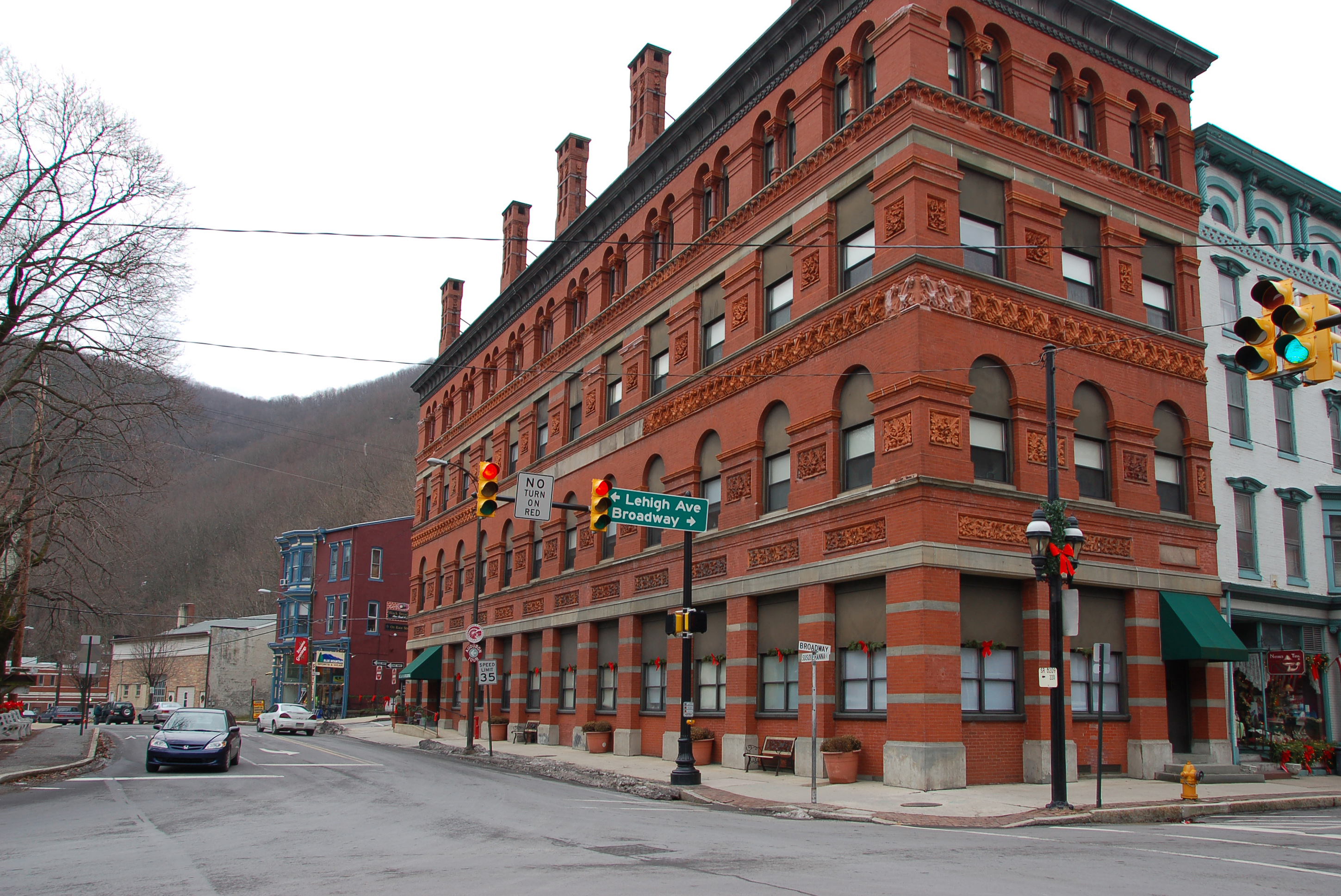
The corporate headquarters of Lehigh Coal & Navigation Company in Mauch Chunk in present-day Jim Thorpe, Pennsylvania in the Coal Region. The company, which helped spearhead the U.S. industrial revolution, was founded in 1822 and dissolved in 1986.

The Coal Region, also known as the Anthracite Coal Region, is a subregion of Northeastern Pennsylvania. It is known for being home to the largest known deposits of anthracite coal in the world with an estimated reserve of seven billion short tons.

The region is typically defined as comprising five Pennsylvania counties, Carbon County, Lackawanna County, Luzerne County, Northumberland County, and Schuylkill County. It is home to 910,716 people as of the 2010 census.

The Coal Region is bordered by Berks, Lehigh, and Northampton Counties (including the Lehigh Valley) to its south; Columbia and Dauphin Counties to its west; Wyoming County to its north; and Monroe County, Pennsylvania to its east.

== History ==
=== 18th century ===
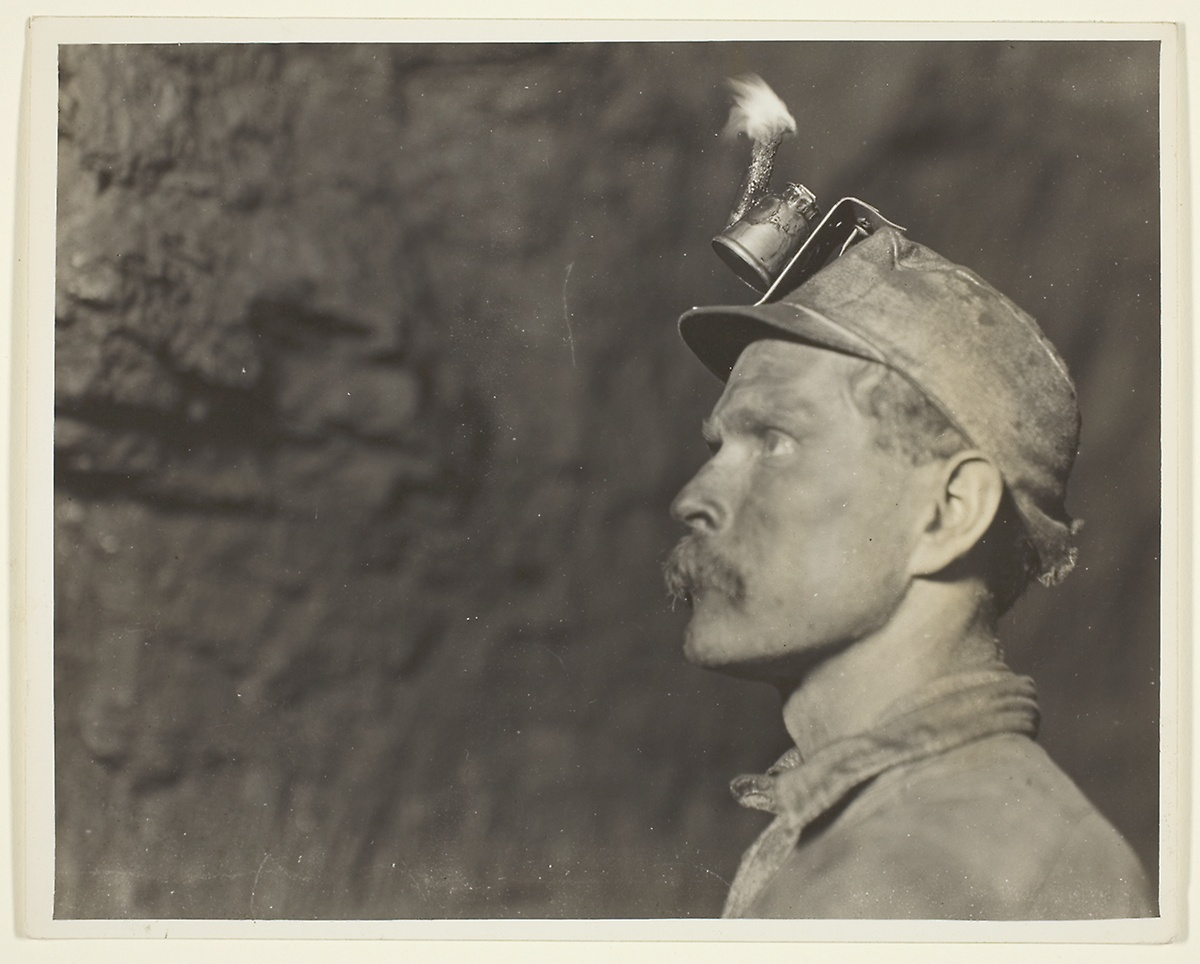
A Welsh miner in a coal mine in Pennsylvania's Coal Region in 1910

By the 18th century, the Susquehannock Native American tribe that had inhabited the region was reduced 90 percent in three years of a plague of diseases and possibly war, opening up the Susquehanna Valley and all of Pennsylvania to European settlers. Settlement in the region predates the American Revolution. Both Delaware and Susquehannock power had been broken by disease and wars between Native American tribes before the British took over the Dutch and Swedish colonies and settled Pennsylvania.

The first discovery of anthracite coal in the region occurred in 1762, and the first mine was established 13 years later, in 1775 near present-day Pittston.

In 1791, anthracite was discovered by a hunter atop Pisgah Ridge, and by 1792 the Lehigh Coal & Navigation Company began producing and shipping coal to Philadelphia via present-day Jim Thorpe from the Southern Anthracite Field and Summit Hill, built between Schuylkill County and what would become Carbon County.

=== 19th century ===
In 1818, customers fed up with the inconsistent mismanagement leased the Lehigh Coal Mining Company and founded the Lehigh Navigation Company. Construction of navigation and locks and dams on the Lehigh River rapids, later known as the Lehigh Canal, was completed in 1820.

In 1822, the two companies merged as the Lehigh Coal & Navigation Company (LC&N). By 1824, the company was shipping large volumes of coal down the Lehigh and Delaware Canals. Meanwhile, three brothers had similar ideas from near the turn of the century, and about the same time began mining coal in Carbondale, 15 miles (24.1 km) northeast of Scranton, but high enough to run a gravity railroad to the Delaware River and feed New York City via the Delaware and Hudson Canal. Pennsylvania began the Delaware Canal to connect the Lehigh Canal to Philadelphia and environs, while funding to build a canal across the Appalachians' Allegheny Mountains to Pittsburgh. In 1827, LC&N built the nation's second railroad, whose Mauch Chunk Switchback Railway ran from Summit Hill to present-day Jim Thorpe.

The region's population grew rapidly following the American Civil War, due largely to the expansion of the mining and railroad industries. English, Welsh, Irish, and German immigrants formed a large portion of this increase. This immigration wave was followed, in turn, by Polish, Slovak, Ruthenian, Ukrainian, Hungarian, Italian, Russian, Belarusian, Jewish, and Lithuanian immigrants. The influence of these immigrant populations is still strongly felt in the region, with various towns featuring and offering various ethnic characters and cuisine.

=== 20th century ===
In 1959, the Knox Mine disaster served as a death knell for deep mining, leading to its ultimate shutdown in the mid-1960s; almost all current anthracite mining is done via strip mining.

Strip mines and fires, most notably in Centralia, remain visible. Several violent incidents in the history of the U.S. labor movement occurred within the coal region, which was the home of the Molly Maguires and the location of the Lattimer Massacre.

Tours of underground mines can be taken in Ashland, Scranton, and Lansford, each of which have museums dedicated to the region's historic anthracite mining industry. Patch towns and small villages, often historically founded and owned by mining companies, also still exist. While they are no longer company-owned, most of them still exist as boroughs or townships, and one of them, the Eckley Miners' Village, is a museum and preserved historical town owned and administered by the Pennsylvania Historical and Museum Commission, which seeks to restore patch towns to their original state.

== Geography ==
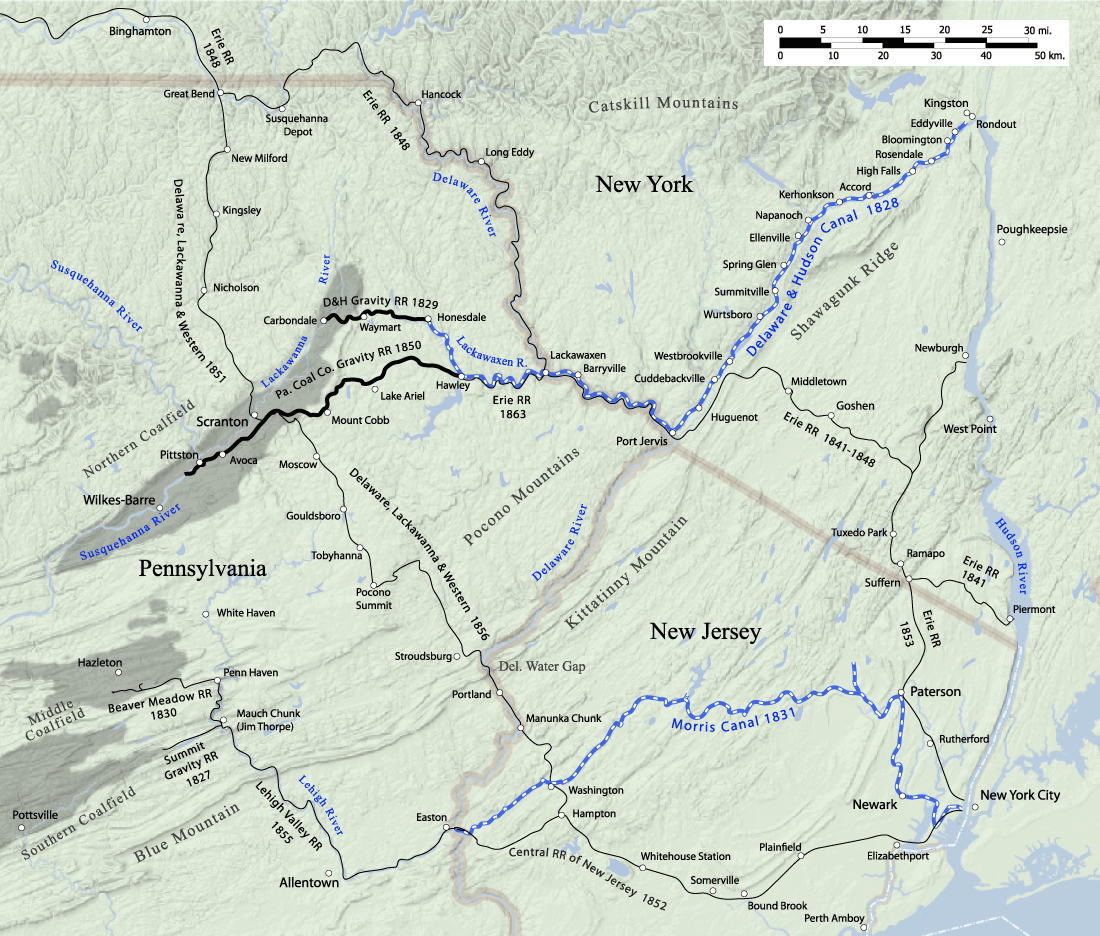
The Coal Region's route to New York City, which ultimately served as the foundation for the Delaware and Hudson Railway and inspired the construction of the Delaware and Hudson Canal in 1872

The Coal Region lies north of the Lehigh Valley and Berks County regions, south of the Endless Mountains, west of the Pocono Mountains, and east of the Susquehanna Valley. The region lies at the northern edge of the Ridge-and-Valley Appalachians, and draws its name from the vast deposits of anthracite coal that can be found under several of the valleys in the region.

The Wyoming Valley is the most densely populated of these valleys, and contains the cities of Wilkes-Barre, Greater Pittston, and Scranton. Hazleton and Pottsville are two of the larger cities in the southern portion of the region. The Lehigh and Schuylkill rivers both originate within the region, while the much larger Susquehanna River skirts the northern edge.

Academics have made the distinction between the North Anthracite Coal Field and the South Anthracite Coal Field, the lower region bearing the further classification Anthracite Uplands in physical geology. The Southern Coal Region can be further broken into the Southeastern and Southwestern Coal Regions, with the divide between the Little Schuylkill River and easternmost tributary of the Schuylkill River with the additional divide line from the Lehigh River watershed extended through Barnesville the determining basins.

County	2010 Population	2020 Population	Area
Carbon County	65,249	64,749	387 sq mi (1,002 km^{2})
Columbia County	67,295	64,727	490 sq mi (1,269 km^{2})
Lackawanna County	214,437	215,896	465 sq mi (1,204 km^{2})
Luzerne County	320,918	325,594	906 sq mi (2,350 km2)
Northumberland County	94,528	91,647	478 sq mi (1,238 km^{2})
Schuylkill County	148,289	143,049	783 sq mi (2,028 km^{2})
Total	910,716	898,834	3,509 sq mi (9,088 km^{2})

== People ==
Notable people from the Coal Region

- Nick Adams, actor
- Brianna Collins, singer/songwriter, artist
- Joe Amato, five-time NHRA Top Fuel Champion Drag Racer
- Gary Becker, Nobel Prize–winning economist
- Joe Biden, 46th President of the United States
- David Bohm, quantum physicist
- George Bretz (1842–1895), photographed the Coal Region
- Les Brown, jazz musician
- Bill Bufalino, attorney
- Russell Bufalino, Northeastern Pennsylvania crime boss and head of Bufalino crime family
- Ben Burnley, lead singer of rock band Breaking Benjamin
- P. J. Carlesimo, professional basketball coach, San Antonio Spurs
- Robert P. Casey, former Governor of Pennsylvania
- Bob Casey, Jr., former U.S. Senator from Pennsylvania
- George Catlin, artist
- Jimmy Cefalo, professional football player, Miami Dolphins
- Stan Coveleski, Major League Baseball Hall of Fame member
- Anthony P. Damato, United States Marine, Medal of Honor recipient
- Jack Dolbin, professional football player, Denver Broncos
- Jimmy Dorsey, jazz clarinetist, saxophonist, big band leader
- Tommy Dorsey, jazz trombonist, big band leader
- Ellen Albertini Dow, actress, The Wedding Singer's Rapping Granny
- Ham Fisher, cartoonist
- Daniel J. Flood, U.S. Congressman
- Alexander Joseph Foley, United States Marine, Medal of Honor recipient
- Howard Gardner, scientist, author
- James M. Gavin, Lieutenant General, United States Army
- Jimmy Gownley, author, illustrator, cartoonist
- Tim Holden, former U.S. Congressman
- Henry Hynoski, professional football player for the New York Giants
- Jane Jacobs, sociologist, author
- Russell Johnson, actor
- John E. Jones III, judge
- George Joulwan, Supreme Allied Commander, Europe from 1993 to 1997.
- Paul E. Kanjorski, member of Congress
- Jean Kerr, author
- Eddie Korbich, actor
- William Kotzwinkle, author
- Matthew Lesko, infomercial personality
- Edward B. Lewis, Nobel Prize-winning scientist
- Joe Maddon, manager of the Chicago Cubs
- Joseph L. Mankiewicz, film director, producer, and screenwriter
- Richard Marcinko, Navy Seal, author
- Christy Mathewson, professional baseball player
- Francis T. McAndrew, psychologist, professor, and author
- Mary McDonnell, actress
- Gerry McNamara, college basketball player, Syracuse University
- Jason Miller, Pulitzer Prize-winning playwright, actor
- Mike Munchak, professional football coach and former professional football player
- Jozef Murgaš, radio pioneer
- Amedeo Obici, founder of the Planters Peanuts Company
- John O'Hara, author
- Jim O'Neill, former baseball player
- Steve O'Neill, former baseball player
- Jack Palance, actor
- William Daniel Phillips, Nobel Prize-winning scientist
- Joe Pisarcik, former NFL quarterback
- Darryl Ponicsan, author, screenwriter
- Robert Reich, former U.S. Secretary of Labor
- Paul W. Richards, former astronaut
- Conrad Richter, author
- Hugh Rodham, father of Hillary Rodham Clinton
- Tim Ruddy, former professional football player, Miami Dolphins
- Victor Schertzinger, composer, film director, film producer and screenwriter
- William Scranton, former Governor of Pennsylvania and 1964 U.S. presidential candidate
- William Scranton, III, former Lieutenant Governor of Pennsylvania
- B. F. Skinner, psychologist, radical behaviorist, Harvard professor, and author
- Jimmy Spencer, former NASCAR driver and current TV analyst
- Bob Sura, former NBA basketball player
- Charley Trippi, played for Pittston Patriots, NFL Hall of Fame
- John Anthony Walker, spy for the Soviet Union
- Ed Walsh, former professional baseball player, Chicago White Sox
- Richard Yuengling Jr., American billionaire businessman and president and owner of Yuengling Brewing
- Frank Zane, three-time Mr. Olympia

== See also ==
- Eckley Miners' Village
- Franklin B. Gowen
- Major coal producing regions
- Schuylkill Canal
