= George Bretz (photographer) =

American photographer

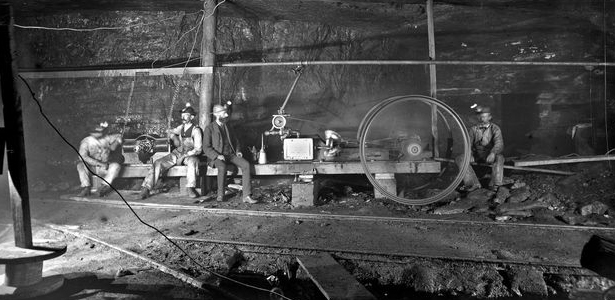
Underground photo of miners, and the dynamo installed to illuminate the underground workings for the Bretz photo-shoot in the Kohinoor Coal Mine, Shenandoah, Pennsylvania. Photo by George Bretz, 1884

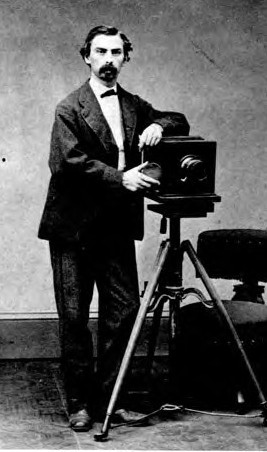
George M. Bretz self-portrait

George M. Bretz (June 6, 1842– April 12, 1895) was an American photographer who is best known for his photographs of the Northeastern Pennsylvania Coal Region and its coal miners.

A collection of Bretz's original glass plate negatives from the Kohinoor Mine at the Shenandoah Colliery were rediscovered in 2011 at the National Museum of American History. Taken circa 1884, this was one of the earliest fully illuminated photo shoots in an underground mine. These photographs were displayed at the 1884 World Cotton Centennial in New Orleans, and again at the 1893 World's Columbian Exposition in Chicago. Bretz is also known for his photos of alleged Molly Maguires, radical coal miners who fought against unfair labor practices in the coal fields. For the rest of his life, Bretz was considered an authority on coal mining, and articles about his photography were widely published.
