= Daniel Keller (politician) =

German politician (born 1986)

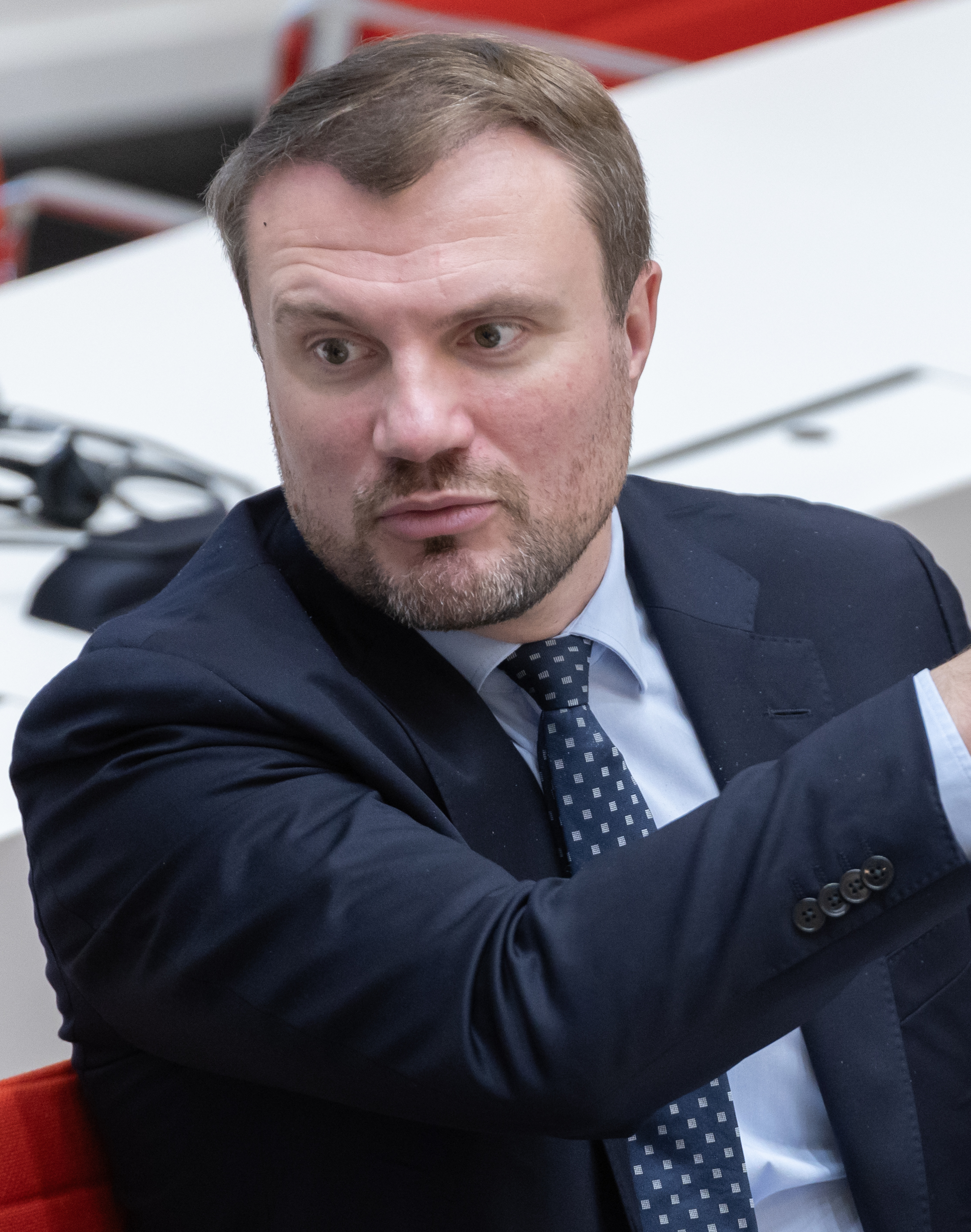
- Daniel Keller in 2025

Minister of Economic Affairs, Labour, Energy and Climate Protection of Brandenburg
- Incumbent
- Assumed office 11 December 2024
- Minister-President: Dietmar Woidke
- Preceded by: Jörg Steinbach

Personal details
- Born: 9 August 1986 (age 39)
- Party: Social Democratic Party (since 2006)

Daniel Keller (born 9 August 1986) is a German politician serving as minister of economic affairs, labour, energy and climate protection of Brandenburg from 2024 to March 2026 and serving since March 2026 as minister of finance. He has been a member of the Landtag of Brandenburg since 2019, and served as group leader of the Social Democratic Party from 2021 to 2024. From 2015 to 2024, he was a city councillor of Potsdam.
