= Anthony P. Damato =

Anthony Peter Damato
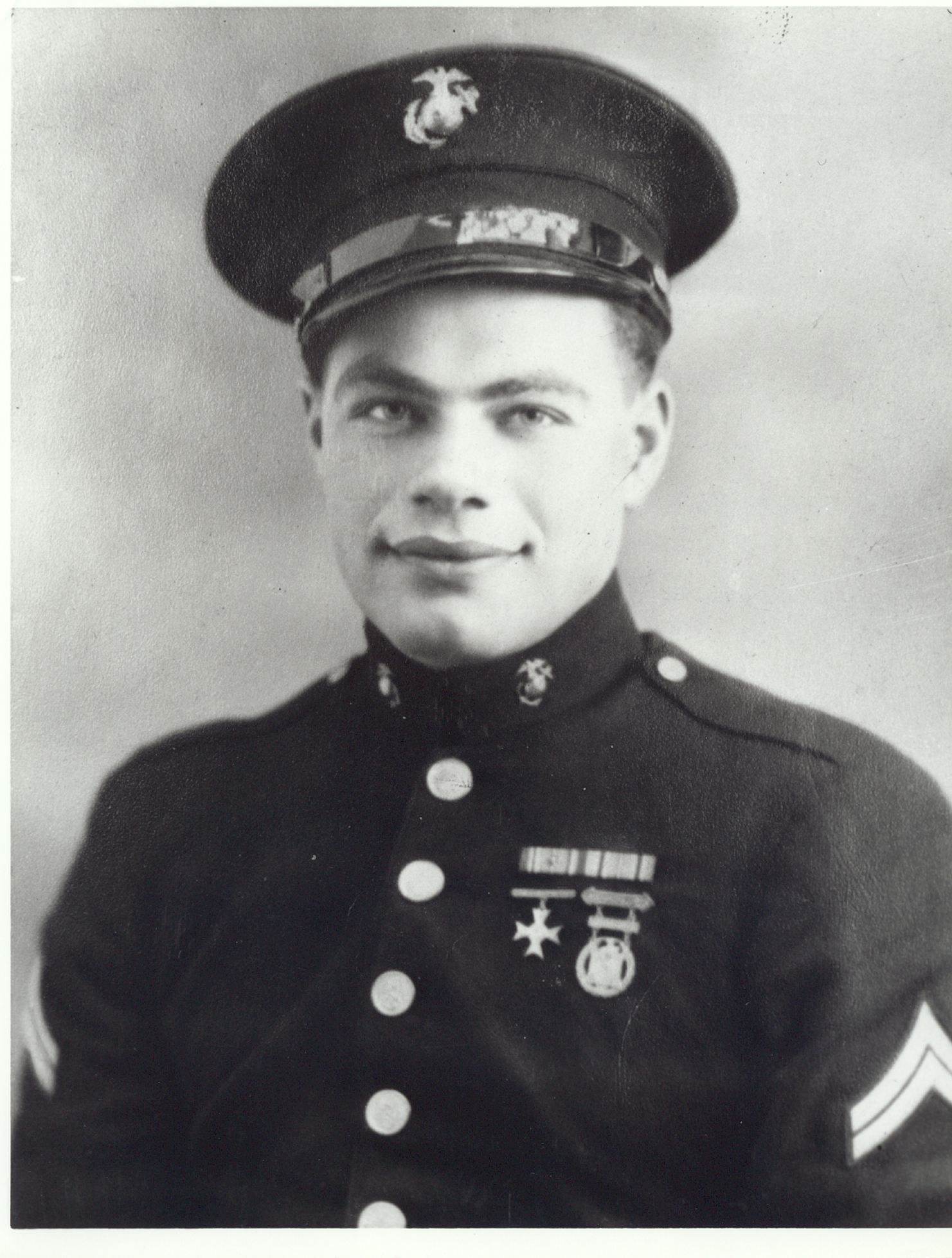
- Anthony P. Damato, Medal of Honor recipient
- Born: March 28, 1922; Shenandoah, Pennsylvania, US
- Died: February 20, 1944 (aged 21); Engebi Island, Eniwetok Atoll, Marshall Islands
- Burial place: National Memorial Cemetery of the Pacific, Honolulu, Hawaii
- Military career
- Allegiance: United States
- Branch: United States Marine Corps
- Service years: 1942–1944
- Rank: Corporal
- Units: 2nd Battalion, 22nd Marines, 1st Provisional Marine Brigade
- Conflicts: World War II: Operation Torch; Battle of Eniwetok †
- Awards: Medal of Honor; Purple Heart; Navy Unit Commendation

Corporal Anthony Peter Damato (March 28, 1922 – February 20, 1944) was a United States Marine who received the Medal of Honor posthumously for his valor and sacrifice of life during World War II. On the night of February 19–20, 1944 on Engebi Island in the Marshall Islands, Corporal Damato sacrificed his life to save the lives of his fellow Marines.

== Biography ==
Damato was born on March 28, 1922, in Shenandoah, Pennsylvania. He was educated in the elementary and high schools of Shenandoah. Before enlistment, he was last employed as a truck driver.

Damato enlisted in the United States Marine Corps on January 8, 1942. He went to Derry, Northern Ireland, in May of that year. During the first year of his enlistment, he distinguished himself, volunteering for special duty with a select invasion party that took part in the North African landings. He was advanced in rate for especially meritorious conduct in action while serving aboard ship at the port city of Arzew, Algeria, on November 8, 1942. Landing with an assault wave entering the port from seaward, he assisted in boarding and seizing vessels in the harbor, and ultimately the port itself. He returned to the United States in March 1943, and three months later, sailed for duty in the Pacific.

Damato was serving with an assault company of the 2nd Battalion, 22nd Marines, 5th Amphibious Corps, on Engebi Island, Eniwetok Atoll, Marshall Islands when on the night of February 19–20, 1944, while in a foxhole with two companions, he threw himself upon an enemy grenade, absorbing the explosion with his body, resulting in his instant death.

Corporal Damato was initially buried in the Temporary American Cemetery on Kiririan Island in the Marshall Islands. Later, his remains were reinterred in the National Cemetery of the Pacific in Honolulu, Hawaii. Damato's brother, Captain Neil Damato, was killed in action over Germany in 1943 while serving in the US Army Air Corps.

== Honors ==
On April 9, 1945, the tiny mining community of Shenandoah, Pennsylvania, turned out en masse to pay homage to Corporal Damato at the presentation ceremonies for the Medal of Honor. The presentation was made to his mother by Marine Corps Brigadier General M. C. Gregory at the J.W. Cooper High School, where Cpl Damato had been a student.

The USS Damato, a Gearing-class destroyer of the United States Navy, was named in honor of Corporal Damato.

In June 2009, students from Shenandoah Valley High School began work on a 150-foot-long and up to 30-foot-high mural honoring Damato on the north wall of the American Legion post named after him. With assistance from local artist Martin Braukus, the mural was completed in December 2011.

== Medal of Honor citation ==
The President of the United States takes pride in presenting the MEDAL OF HONOR to

CORPORAL ANTHONY P. DAMATO
UNITED STATES MARINE CORPS

for service as set forth in the following CITATION:

For conspicuous gallantry and intrepidity at the risk of his life above and beyond the call of duty while serving with an assault company of the Second Battalion, Twenty-Second Marines, Fifth Amphibious Corps, in action against enemy Japanese forces on Eniwetok Atoll Marshall Islands, on the night of February 19,-20, 1944. Highly vulnerable to sudden attack by small, fanatical groups of Japanese still at large despite the efficient and determined efforts of our forces to clear the area, Corporal Damato lay with two comrades in a large foxhole in his company's defense perimeter which had been dangerously thinned by the forced withdrawal of nearly half of the available men. When one of the enemy approached the foxhole undetected and threw in a hand grenade, Corporal Damato desperately groped for it in the darkness. Realizing the imminent peril to all three and fully aware of the consequences of his act, he unhesitatingly flung himself on the grenade and, although instantly killed as his body absorbed the explosion, saved the lives of his two companions. Corporal Damato's splendid initiative, fearless conduct and valiant sacrifice reflect great upon himself and the United States Naval Service. He gallantly gave his life for his comrades. /S/ FRANKLIN D. ROOSEVELT

== See also ==
- List of Medal of Honor recipients for World War II
