= Steeven Bretz =

German politician (born 1976)

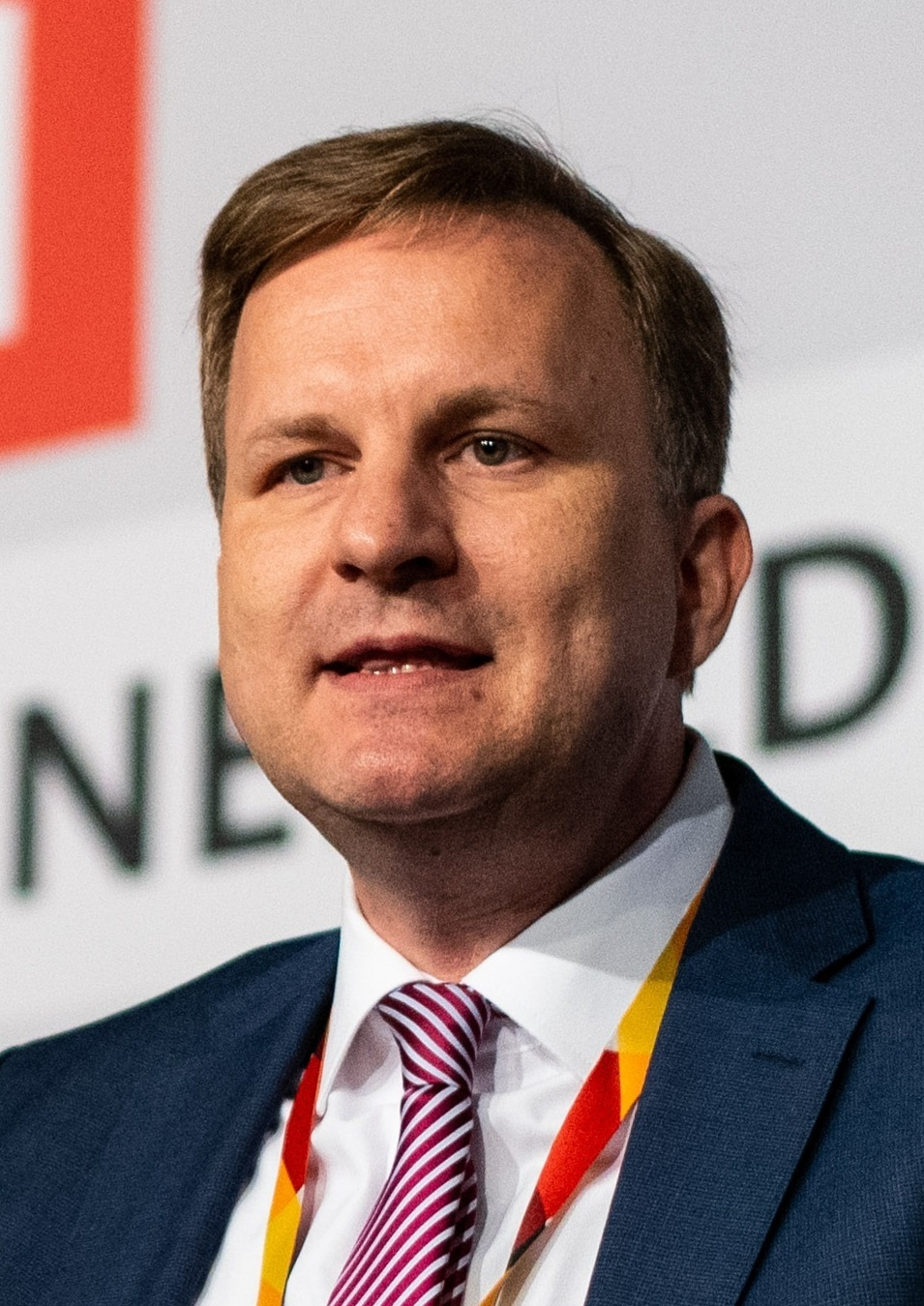
- Bretz in 2019

Member of the Landtag of Brandenburg
- Incumbent
- Assumed office 21 October 2009

Personal details
- Born: 7 March 1976 (age 50) Potsdam
- Party: Christian Democratic Union (since 1997)

Steeven Bretz (born 7 March 1976 in Potsdam) is a German politician serving as a member of the Landtag of Brandenburg since 2009. He has served as chief whip of the Christian Democratic Union since 2019.
