= List of Medal of Honor recipients for the Boxer Rebellion =

American servicemen awarded the Medal of Honor for actions in China around 1900

The Boxer Movement, or Boxer Rebellion, was a Chinese uprising from November 1899 to September 7, 1901, against foreign influence in areas such as trade, politics, religion and technology that occurred in China during the final years of the Manchu rule (Qing dynasty).

The members of the Chinese Society of Righteous and Harmonious Fists were simply called boxers by the Westerners due to the martial arts and calisthenics they practiced. It began as an anti-foreign, anti-imperialist, peasant-based movement that attacked foreigners who were building railroads and violating Feng shui. Christians who they felt were responsible for foreign domination of China were also targeted. In June 1900, the Boxers invaded Beijing and killed 230 non-Chinese. The Qing commander in chief Ronglu expelled the Boxers from the city. The Qing ordered foreign diplomats and personnel to leave to Tianjin but they refused and stay put in the legation quarter of Beijing.

After the foreign attack at the Battle of Taku Forts (1900) and the foreign invasion in the Seymour Expedition the government of Empress Dowager Cixi ordered the Kansu Braves to surround the foreign diplomats, civilians, soldiers and some Chinese Christians in the legation quarter. The "siege" lasted 55 days until a multinational coalition rushed 20,000 troops to their rescue in the Gaselee Expedition. The Chinese government was forced to indemnify the victims and make many additional concessions. Subsequent reforms implemented after the crisis of 1900 laid the foundation for the end of the Qing dynasty and the establishment of the modern Chinese Republic.

The Medal of Honor was created during the American Civil War and is the highest military decoration presented by the United States government to a member of its armed forces. The recipients must have distinguished themselves at the risk of their own life above and beyond the call of duty in action against an enemy of the United States. Due to the nature of this medal, it is commonly presented posthumously.

During the Boxer rebellion, 59 American servicemen received the Medal of Honor for their actions. Four of these were for Army personnel, twenty-two went to Navy sailors and the remaining thirty-three went to Marines. Harry Fisher was the first Marine to receive the medal posthumously and the only posthumous recipient for this conflict.

== Recipients ==
This with the * indicates that the Medal of Honor was awarded posthumously.

Image	Name	Service	Rank	Place of action	Date of action	Notes
—	John M. Adams	Marine Corps	Sergeant	near Tianjin, China	Jul 13, 1900	"[For] distinguishing himself by meritorious conduct"
—	Harry C. Adriance	Marine Corps	Corporal	near Tianjin, China	Jul 13, 1900	"[For] distinguishing himself by meritorious conduct"
—	Edward Allen	Navy	Boatswain's Mate First Class	China	Jun 13, 1900 and Jun 20, 1900 – Jun 22, 1900	"[For] distinguishing himself by meritorious conduct"
—	Edwin N. Appleton	Marine Corps	Corporal	Tianjin, China	Jun 20, 1900	"[A]ssisted in destroying buildings occupied by the enemy"
—	Erwin J. Boydston	Marine Corps	Private	Beijing, China	Jul 21, 1900 – Aug 17, 1900	"[A]ssisted in the erection of barricades"
	Andre W. Brewster	Army	Captain	Tianjin, China	Jul 13, 1900	"While under fire rescued two of his men from drowning"
—	James Burnes	Marine Corps	Private	Tianjin, China	Jun 20, 1900	"[A]ssisted in destroying buildings occupied by hostile forces"
—	Albert R. Campbell	Marine Corps	Private	Tianjin, China	Jun 21, 1900	For distinguishing himself by his conduct during the advance on Tientsin
—	William L. Carr	Marine Corps	Private	Beijing, China	Jul 21, 1900 – Aug 17, 1900	For distinguishing himself by his conduct in the presence of the enemy
—	John P. Chatham	Navy	Gunner's Mate Second Class	China	Jun 13, 1900 and Jun 20, 1900 – Jun 22, 1900	For distinguishing himself by his conduct in the presence of the enemy.
—	Joseph Clancy	Navy	Chief Boatswain's Mate	China	Jun 13, 1900 and Jun 20, 1900 – Jun 22, 1900	For distinguishing himself by his conduct in the presence of the enemy.
—	James Cooney	Marine Corps	Private	near Tianjin, China	Jul 13, 1900	"[For] distinguishing himself by meritorious conduct"
—	John O. Dahlgren	Marine Corps	Corporal	Beijing, China	Jun 20, 1900 – Jul 16, 1900	"[For] distinguishing himself by meritorious conduct"
Head and shoulders of a white man wearing a cap and a jacket with stripes on the upper sleeves, one medal pinned to the left breast, and two identical star–shaped medals hanging from ribbons around his neck.	Daniel J. Daly	Marine Corps	Private	Beijing, China	Aug 14, 1900	For distinguishing himself by meritorious conduct. Later awarded a second Medal of Honor for action in Haiti in 1915.
—	Harry Fisher*	Marine Corps	Private	Beijing, China	Jun 20, 1900 – Jul 16, 1900	True name: Franklin J. Phillips (enlisted under alias); previously served in the U.S. Army. First US Marine to receive Medal of Honor posthumously.
Head of a white man with brown hair and a drooping mustache wearing a blue military jacket. The man is looking off to the side.	Alexander J. Foley	Marine Corps	Sergeant	near Tianjin, China	Jul 13, 1900	"[For] distinguishing himself by meritorious conduct"
Head and shoulders of a white man wearing a peaked cap and a dark military jacket with ribbon bars on the left breast and bright buttons down the center.	Charles R. Francis	Marine Corps	Private	near Tianjin, China	Jun 21, 1900	"[For] distinguishing himself by meritorious conduct"
—	Louis R. Gaiennie	Marine Corps	Private	Beijing, China	Jul 21, 1900 – Aug 17, 1900	"[For] distinguishing himself by meritorious conduct"
—	William F. Hamberger	Navy	Chief Carpenter's Mate	China	Jun 13, 1900 and Jun 20, 1900 – Jun 22, 1900	"[For] distinguishing himself by meritorious conduct"
—	Burke Hanford	Navy	Machinist First Class	China	Jun 13, 1900 and Jun 20, 1900 – Jun 22, 1900	"[D]istinguished himself by meritorious conduct"
—	Hans A. Hansen	Navy	Seaman	China	Jun 13, 1900 and Jun 20, 1900 – Jun 22, 1900	"[D]istinguished himself by meritorious conduct
—	Henry W. Heisch	Marine Corps	Private	Tianjin, China	Jun 20, 1900	He crossed the river in a small boat while under heavy enemy fire and assisted in destroying buildings occupied by the enemy
—	William E. Holyoke	Navy	Boatswain's Mate First Class	China	Jun 13, 1900 and Jun 20, 1900 – Jun 22, 1900	"[D]istinguished himself by meritorious conduct"
Head and shoulders of a young white man wearing a cap pushed high up on his forehead and a plain military jacket with a star–shaped medal hanging from a ribbon pinned to his left breast.	William C. Horton	Marine Corps	Private	Beijing, China	Jul 21, 1900 – Aug 17, 1900	"[A]assisted in the erection of barricades"
—	Martin Hunt	Marine Corps	Private	Beijing, China	Jun 20, 1900 – Jul 16, 1900	"[For] distinguishing himself by meritorious conduct"
—	Thomas W. Kates	Marine Corps	Private	Tianjin, China	Jun 21, 1900	"[For] distinguishing himself by meritorious conduct"
—	Joseph Killackey	Navy	Landsman	China	Jun 13, 1900 and Jun 20, 1900 – Jun 22, 1900	"[D]istinguished himself by meritorious conduct"
Head of a young white man with neatly combed hair wearing a jacket with lines of decorative piping running horizontally across the chest.	Louis B. Lawton	Army	First Lieutenant	Tianjin, China	Jul 13, 1900	Carried a message and guided reinforcements across a wide and fireswept space, during which he was wounded three times
—	Clarence E. Mathias	Marine Corps	Private	Tianjin, China	Jul 13, 1900	"[For] distinguishing himself by meritorious conduct"
—	Samuel McAllister	Navy	Ordinary Seaman	Tianjin, China	Jun 20, 1900	Crossed the river in a small boat and assisted in destroying buildings occupied by the enemy
—	John McCloy	Navy	Coxswain	China	Jun 13, 1900 and Jun 20, 1900 – Jun 22, 1900	Later awarded a second Medal of Honor for action in Mexico in 1915.
—	Joseph Mitchell	Navy	Gunner's Mate First Class	Beijing, China	Jul 12, 1900	"[For] distinguishing himself by meritorious conduct"
—	Albert Moore	Marine Corps	Private	Beijing, China	Jul 21, 1900 – Aug 17, 1900	Assisted in the erection of barricades under a heavy fire from the enemy
—	John A. Murphy	Marine Corps	Drummer	Beijing, China	Jul 21, 1900 – Aug 17, 1900	"[For] distinguishing himself by meritorious conduct"
—	William H. Murray	Marine Corps	Private	Beijing, China	Jul 21, 1900 – Aug 17, 1900	"[D]istinguished himself by meritorious conduct" Served under the name of Henry W. Davis.
—	Harry W. Orndoff	Marine Corps	Private	China	Jun 13, 1900 and Jun 20, 1900 – Jun 22, 1900	"[D]istinguished himself by meritorious conduct"
—	Carl E. Petersen	Navy	Chief Machinist	Beijing, China	Jun 28, 1900 – Aug 17, 1900	"[D]istinguished himself by meritorious conduct"
—	Reuben J. Phillips	Marine Corps	Corporal	China	Jun 13, 1900 and Jun 20, 1900 – Jun 22, 1900	For distinguishing himself by meritorious conduct in the presence of the enemy
—	Herbert I. Preston	Marine Corps	Private	Beijing, China	Jul 21, 1900 – Aug 17, 1900	"[For] distinguishing himself by meritorious conduct"
A white man sitting relaxed in a wicker chair. He is wearing a white cap, light–colored pants, and a dark jacket with four round medals on the left breast and a star–shaped medal around the neck.	George Rose	Navy	Seaman	Beijing, China	Jun 13, 1900 and Jun 20, 1900 – Jun 22, 1900	For his actions during the China Relief Expedition
—	Francis T. Ryan	Navy	Coxswain	China	Jun 13, 1900 and Jun 20, 1900 – Jun 22, 1900	"[D]istinguished himself by meritorious conduct"
—	David J. Scannell	Marine Corps	Private	Beijing, China	Jul 21, 1900 – Aug 17, 1900	"[For] distinguishing himself by meritorious conduct"
Gunner William Seach c. 1909 standing wearing a cap, and a long military coat with a row of medals on the left breast.	William Seach	Navy	Ordinary Seaman	China	Jun 13, 1900 and Jun 20, 1900 – Jun 22, 1900	Along with six others repulsed an attack by 300 Chinese Imperialist soldiers and Boxer militants with a bayonet charge
—	France Silva	Marine Corps	Private	Beijing, China	Jun 28, 1900 – Aug 17, 1900	"[For] distinguishing himself by meritorious conduct"
—	Frank E. Smith	Navy	Oiler	China	Jun 13, 1900 and Jun 20, 1900 – Jun 22, 1900	In the presence of the enemy he distinguished himself by meritorlous conduct
—	James Smith	Navy	Landsman	China	Jun 13, 1900 and Jun 20, 1900 – Jun 22, 1900	In the presence of the enemy he distinguished himself by meritorious conduct
Head and shoulders of a white man with a thin, upturned mustache wearing a white peaked cap with black visor and a white jacket with dark shoulder boards, a row of medals on the left breast, and a star–shaped medal hanging from the neck.	Robert H. Stanley	Navy	Hospital Apprentice	Beijing, China	Jul 12, 1900	Volunteered to carry messages under fire
—	Peter Stewart	Marine Corps	Gunnery Sergeant	China	Jun 13, 1900 and Jun 20, 1900 – Jun 22, 1900	In the presence of the enemy he distinguished himself by meritorious conduct
—	Clarence E. Sutton	Marine Corps	Sergeant	Tianjin, China	Jul 13, 1900	Although under heavy fire from the enemy he assisted in carrying a wounded officer from the field of battle
—	Karl Thomas*	Navy	Coxswain	China	Jun 13, 1900 and Jun 20, 1900 – Jun 22, 1900	"[D]distinguished himself by meritorious conduct"
	Calvin P. Titus	Army	Musician	Beijing, China	Aug 14, 1900	Gallant and daring conduct in the presence of the men of his regiment and was the first to scale the wall of the city.
—	Martin T. Torgerson	Navy	Gunner's Mate Third Class	China	Jun 13, 1900 and Jun 20, 1900 – Jun 22, 1900	"[D]istinguished himself by meritorious conduct"
	Oscar J. Upham	Marine Corps	Private	Beijing, China	Jul 21, 1900 – Aug 17, 1900	"[A]ssisted in the erection of barricades"
—	Robert H. Von Schlick	Army	Private	Tianjin, China	Jul 13, 1900	"Although previously wounded while carrying a wounded comrade to a place of safety, rejoined his command, which partly occupied an exposed position upon a dike, remaining there after his command had been withdrawn, singly keeping up the fire, and obliviously presenting himself as a conspicuous target until he was literally shot off his position by the enemy."
—	Edward A. Walker	Marine Corps	Sergeant	Beijing, China	Jun 20, 1900 – Jul 16, 1900	"[For] distinguishing himself by meritorious conduct"
—	Axel Westermark	Navy	Seaman	Beijing, China	Jun 28, 1900 – Aug 17, 1900	"[For] distinguishing himself by meritorious conduct"
—	Jay Williams	Navy	Coxswain	China	Jun 13, 1900 and Jun 20, 1900 – Jun 22, 1900	Distinguished himself by meritorious conduct while serving with the relief expedition
—	Frank A. Young	Marine Corps	Private	Beijing, China	Jun 20, 1900 – Jul 16, 1900	"[For] distinguishing himself by meritorious conduct"
—	William Zion	Marine Corps	Private	Beijing, China	Jul 21, 1900 – Aug 17, 1900	"[For] distinguishing himself by meritorious conduct"
