= France Silva =

United States Marine Corps Medal of Honor recipient

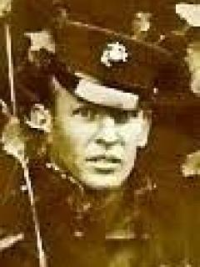
- Born: May 8, 1876; Hayward, California, U.S.
- Died: April 10, 1951 (aged 74); Red Bluff, California, U.S.
- Burial place: Sunset Hills Cemetery, Corning, California
- Military career
- Allegiance: United States
- Branch: United States Marine Corps
- Service years: 1899–1901
- Rank: Private
- Unit: USS Newark
- Conflicts: Boxer Rebellion
- Awards: Medal of Honor

France Silva (May 8, 1876 – April 10, 1951) was the first United States Marine of Mexican-American and Hispanic heritage to receive the Medal of Honor. He received the Medal of Honor for his meritorious conduct in China during the Boxer Rebellion.

== Medal of Honor action ==
Silva joined the Marine Corps on September 12, 1899, in San Francisco and attended Boot Camp at the Mare Island Naval Shipyard. He was assigned to the U.S. flagship Newark where Private Daniel Joseph Daly (future double Medal of Honor recipient) was already a member. They became good friends. The Newark soon headed to the Philippines, to take part in the Spanish–American War, but were then sent to Japan to prepare for a landing at Taku, Tianjin and Beijing. They arrived in Beijing on May 31 before the Boxers closed the city off from the world.

In 1900, Private France Silva was a member of the Legation Guards (Marines) under the command of Captain Newt H. Hall, aboard the USS Newark. The USS Newark was a United States Navy protected cruiser, the first modern cruiser in the U.S. fleet. On May 20, 1900, the Newark sailed for China to help land allied troops to assist civilians within the legations which came under siege by the Boxers at Beijing. Arriving Tianjin on May 22.

As Captains John Twiggs Myers and Newt Hall, USMC – under the command of Captain Bowman H. McCalla, USN – were in the lead position of the allies, the all European Brass Band played, There'll Be a Hot Time in the Old Town Tonight. Afterward, they immediately posted guard. Captain Meyers had given the command, "Fix, Bayonets!" just before their approach. They double timed the last 300 yards and the crowd cheered.

Later, when they entered the Forbidden City of Beijing, Edwin Conger, the lead U.S. Diplomat (and former Army officer) said to Myers, "Thank God you are here. Now we are safe."

On June 19, 1900, the 1st Regiment (Marines) under Major Littleton Waller, USMC, attempted to take the city of Tientsin and failed. Then on June 23, the Regiment, under the command of Major Waller, was able to enter Tianjin in their second attempt and force the Chinese forces to retreat to Peking. Private France Silva, several other Marines and two sailors, Navy Seamen Axel Westermark and Chief Machinist Emil Petersen earned the Medal of Honor in their defense of the civilian compound (legation) at Beijing. They defended the walled city from June 28 until the fall of the city which occurred on August 17.

In accordance to a newspaper article:

"The USS Newark placed ashore a contingent of Marine and three bluejackets as a legation guard. These men and later another detachment of Marines, soldiers and sailors joined the troops of other western countries and Japan in the defense of other Peking legations against the Boxers until the arrival of the Allied Forces in August."

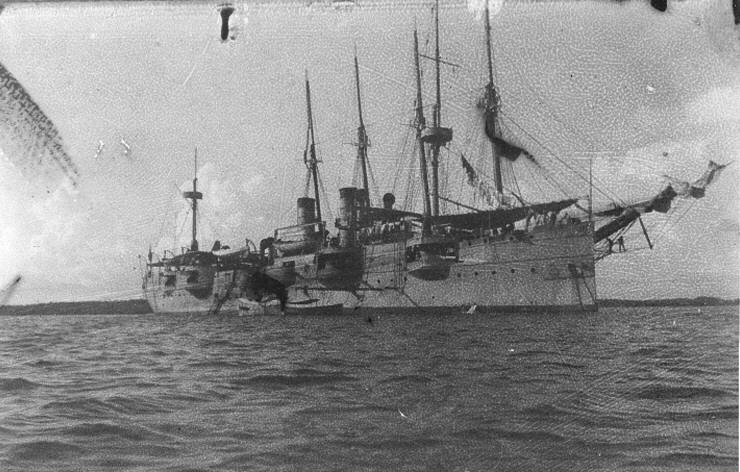
The USS Newark

== Medal of Honor citation ==

SILVA, FRANCE

Private, U.S. Marine Corps
July 19, 1901

G.O. Navy Department, No.55

In the presence of the enemy during the action at Peking, China, June 28, to August 17, 1900. Throughout this period, Silva distinguished himself by meritorious conduct.

== Postscript ==
After the 1906 San Francisco earthquake, Silva reported that he lost all of his papers and his Medal of Honor, but another was mailed to him. He had filed a disability claim with the Department of Veterans Affairs. France Silva died on April 10, 1951, and is buried in Sunset Hill Cemetery in Corning, California.

A model of the American Legation, previously on display at the Navy Yard in the early 1990s, was donated to the Marine Corps League, Detachment 1140, Tehama/Red Bluff, California. This model of the American Legation was then donated to the Northern California Veterans Museum in Redding.

== See also ==
- List of Hispanic Medal of Honor recipients
- List of Medal of Honor recipients
- Hispanics in the United States Marine Corps
