= James Cooney =

James, Jim or Jimmy Cooney may refer to:

- James Cooney (Missouri politician) (1848–1904), Irish-American lawyer and United States Congressman from Marshall, Missouri
- James C. Cooney, Sergeant of the U.S. Army in the 8th U.S. Cavalry who found large silver and gold reserves in the Mogollon Mountains of Catron County, New Mexico
- Jimmy Cooney (1890s shortstop) (1865–1903), MLB shortstop from 1890 to 1892
- Jimmy Cooney (1920s shortstop) (1894–1991), MLB shortstop from 1917 to 1928
- Jimmy Cooney (Galway hurler) (1955–2023), Irish hurler
- James Cooney (Medal of Honor) (1860–1903), American Medal of Honor recipient
- James Cooney (American football) (c. 1880–1964), All-American football player
- Jimmy Cooney (Tipperary hurler) (born 1914), Irish hurler
