= William Seach =

United States Navy Medal of Honor recipient

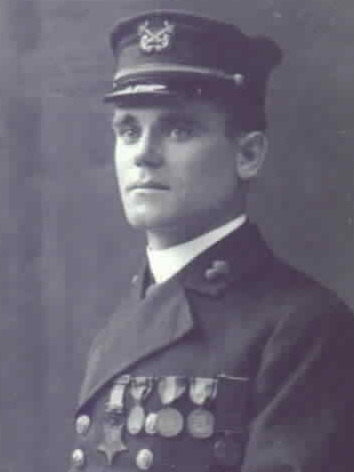
- Seaman William Seach, c. 1901
- Born: May 23, 1877; London, England
- Died: October 24, 1978 (aged 101); Brockton, Massachusetts, U.S.
- Burial place: Arlington National Cemetery, Arlington, Virginia
- Military career
- Allegiance: United States
- Branch: United States Navy
- Service years: 1898–1923
- Rank: Ordinary Seaman; Highest rank: Lieutenant
- Unit: USS Newark
- Conflicts: Boxer Rebellion
- Awards: Medal of Honor

William Seach (May 23, 1877 – October 24, 1978) was a United States Navy sailor and Medal of Honor recipient. He served as an ordinary seaman aboard USS Newark during the Boxer Rebellion and was awarded the Medal of Honor for his actions during the China Relief Expedition in June 1900.

During the Boxer Rebellion, Seach served as an ordinary seaman with a detachment from USS Newark and distinguished himself in several engagements between June 13 and 22, 1900. He was awarded the Medal of Honor for his conduct during the China Relief Expedition.

During World War I, Seach served as a gunnery officer aboard the troop transport USS President Lincoln. The ship was torpedoed and sunk by the German submarine SM U-90 on May 31, 1918, and Seach was wounded and temporarily held aboard the submarine before being rescued.

== Biography ==
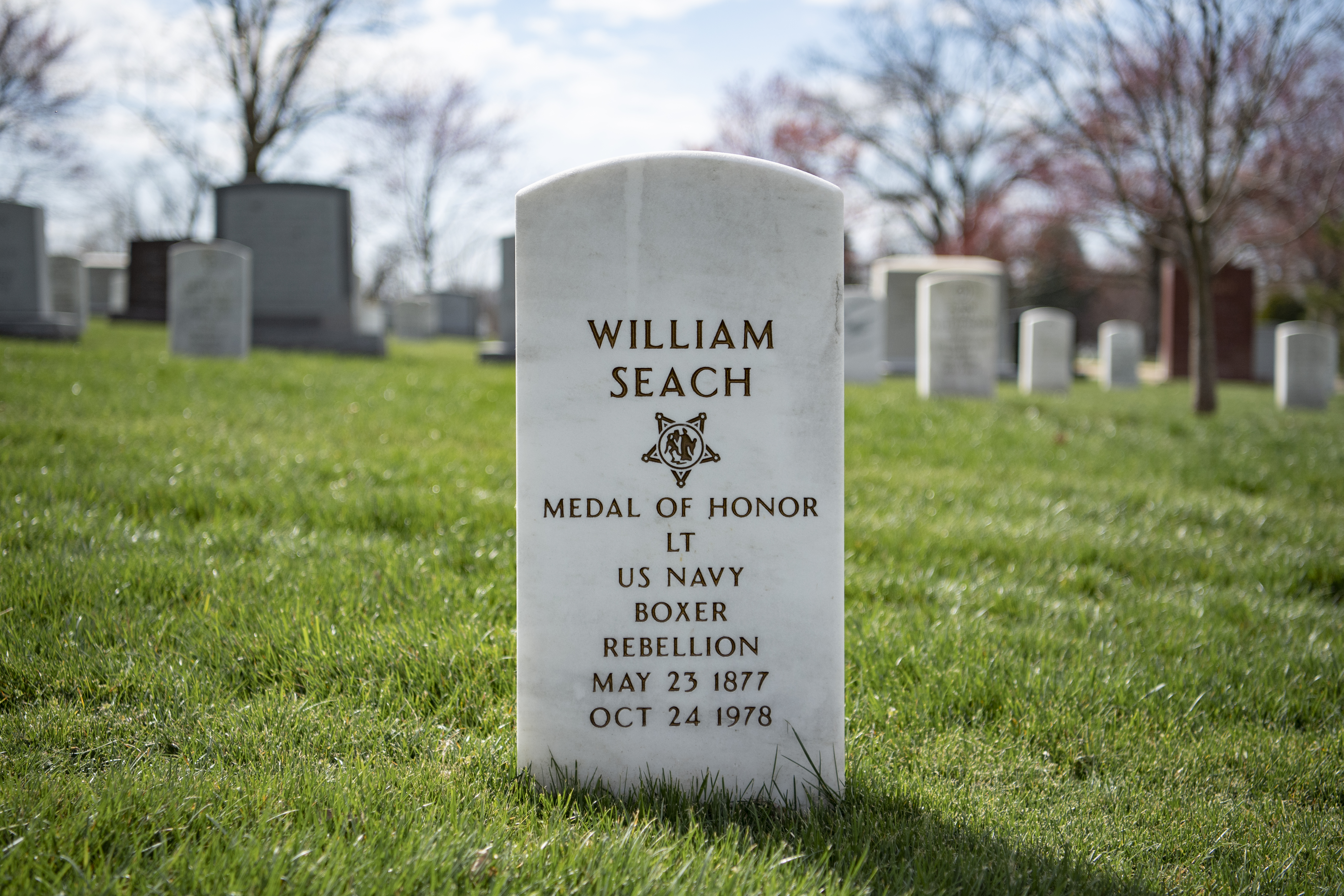
Grave at Arlington National Cemetery

Seach was born May 23, 1877, in London, England. He entered the United States Navy in 1898 and fought as an Ordinary Seaman in China in the Boxer Rebellion. From 13 to 22 June 1900 Seach distinguished himself several times in combat for which he awarded the Medal of Honor in 1901.

On 16 January 1909 Seach was promoted to the Warrant Officer rank of gunner and on 16 January 1915, he was promoted to chief gunner. On 1 July 1918, he received a temporary promotion to the rank of lieutenant.

=== World War I ===
During World War I, Seach served as the gunnery officer on the transport ship USS President Lincoln until she was torpedoed and sunk by the German submarine SM U-90 on 31 May 1918. Seach was injured during the sinking and was briefly held as a prisoner of war by the Germans before being left adrift to be rescued by the French. Also held on U-90 was Lieutenant Edouard Izac who would escape from captivity and was later awarded the Medal of Honor.

=== Retirement ===
Seach retired from the Navy with the rank of Lieutenant in 1923.

Following his retirement, Seach lived in Weymouth, Massachusetts. In 1958 he was a member of the honor guard at the interment of the unknown soldiers of World War II and the Korean War at the Tomb of the Unknowns at Arlington National Cemetery.

=== Death and burial ===
Lieutenant Seach died October 24, 1978, at the age of 101, and is buried at Arlington National Cemetery, in Arlington, Virginia. When he died he was the oldest and longest-living recipient of the Medal of Honor, and the last surviving US veteran of the Boxer Rebellion to receive the medal.

== Legacy ==
Lieutenant Seach's Medal of Honor, along with his other medals and sword, are on display at the United States Naval Shipbuilding Museum on board the heavy cruiser USS Salem at the Fore River Shipyard in Quincy, Massachusetts.

William Seach School in Weymouth, Massachusetts, is named after him.

== Awards ==
- Medal of Honor
- Navy Good Conduct Medal
- Marine Corps Expeditionary Medal
- Spanish Campaign Medal
- Philippine Campaign Medal
- China Relief Expedition Medal
- Haitian Campaign Medal
- World War I Victory Medal with "TRANSPORT" clasp

=== Medal of Honor citation ===
Rank and organization: Ordinary Seaman, U.S. Navy. Place and date: China 13, 20, 21, and 22 June 1900. Entered service at: Massachusetts. Born: 23 May 1877, London, England. G.O. No.: 55, 19 July 1901.

Citation:

In action with the relief expedition of the Allied forces in China during the battles of 13, 20, 21 and 22 June 1900. June 13: Seach and 6 others were cited for their courage in repulsing an attack by 300 Chinese Imperialist soldiers and Boxer militants with a bayonet charge, thus thwarting a planned massive attack on the entire force. June 20: During a day-long battle, Seach ran across an open clearing, gained cover, and cleaned out nests of Chinese snipers. June 21: During a surprise sabre attack by Chinese cavalrymen, Seach was cited for defending gun emplacements. June 22: Seach and others breached the wall of a Chinese fort, fought their way to the enemy's guns, and turned the cannon upon the defenders of the fort. Throughout this period and in the presence of the enemy, Seach distinguished himself by meritorious conduct.

== See also ==
- List of Medal of Honor recipients
- List of Medal of Honor recipients for the Boxer Rebellion
