= Robert H. Stanley =

United States Navy Medal of Honor recipient

Robert Henry Stanley
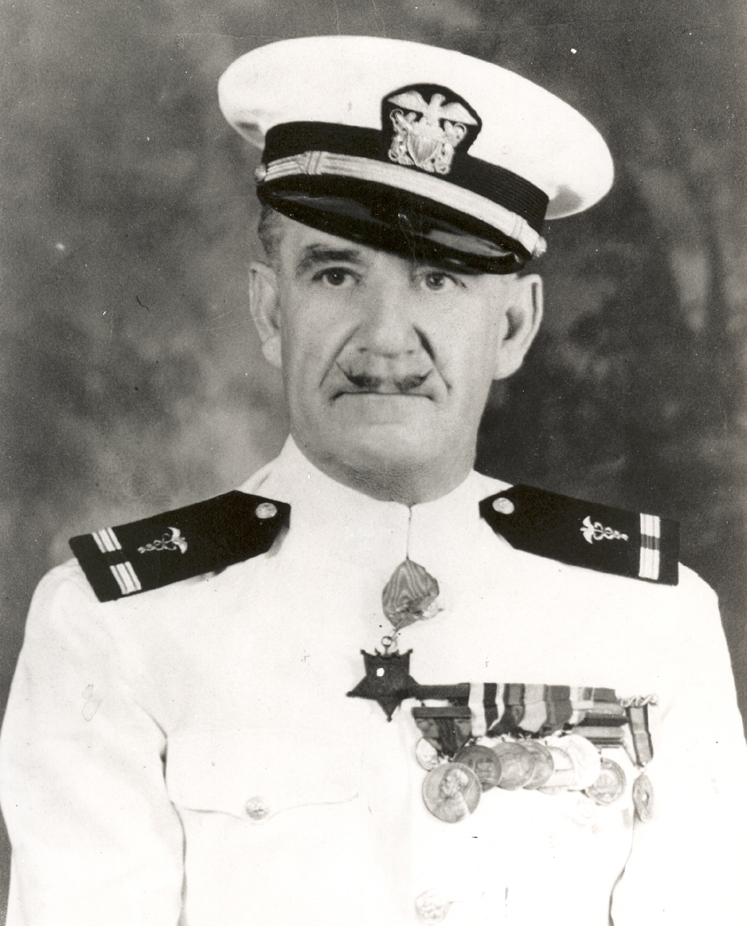
- Robert H. Stanley as a Chief Pharmacist
- Born: May 2, 1881; Brooklyn, New York, US
- Died: July 15, 1942 (aged 61); Pensacola, Florida, US
- Burial place: Arlington National Cemetery
- Military career
- Allegiance: United States
- Branch: United States Navy
- Service years: 1898–1939
- Rank: Chief Pharmacist
- Units: USS Vermont; USS Newark (C-1); USS America
- Conflicts: Spanish–American War; Philippine–American War; Boxer Rebellion; World War I
- Awards: Medal of Honor

Robert Henry Stanley (May 2, 1881 – July 15, 1942) was a 40-year member of the United States Navy. He was the first hospital corpsman to receive the nation's highest military decoration for valor, the Medal of Honor. He was awarded the medal for carrying messages under heavy fire on June 13, 20, 21 and 22 and July 12, 1900, while assigned to the USS Newark at Beijing (then Peking), China during the Boxer Rebellion.

== Early life and military career ==
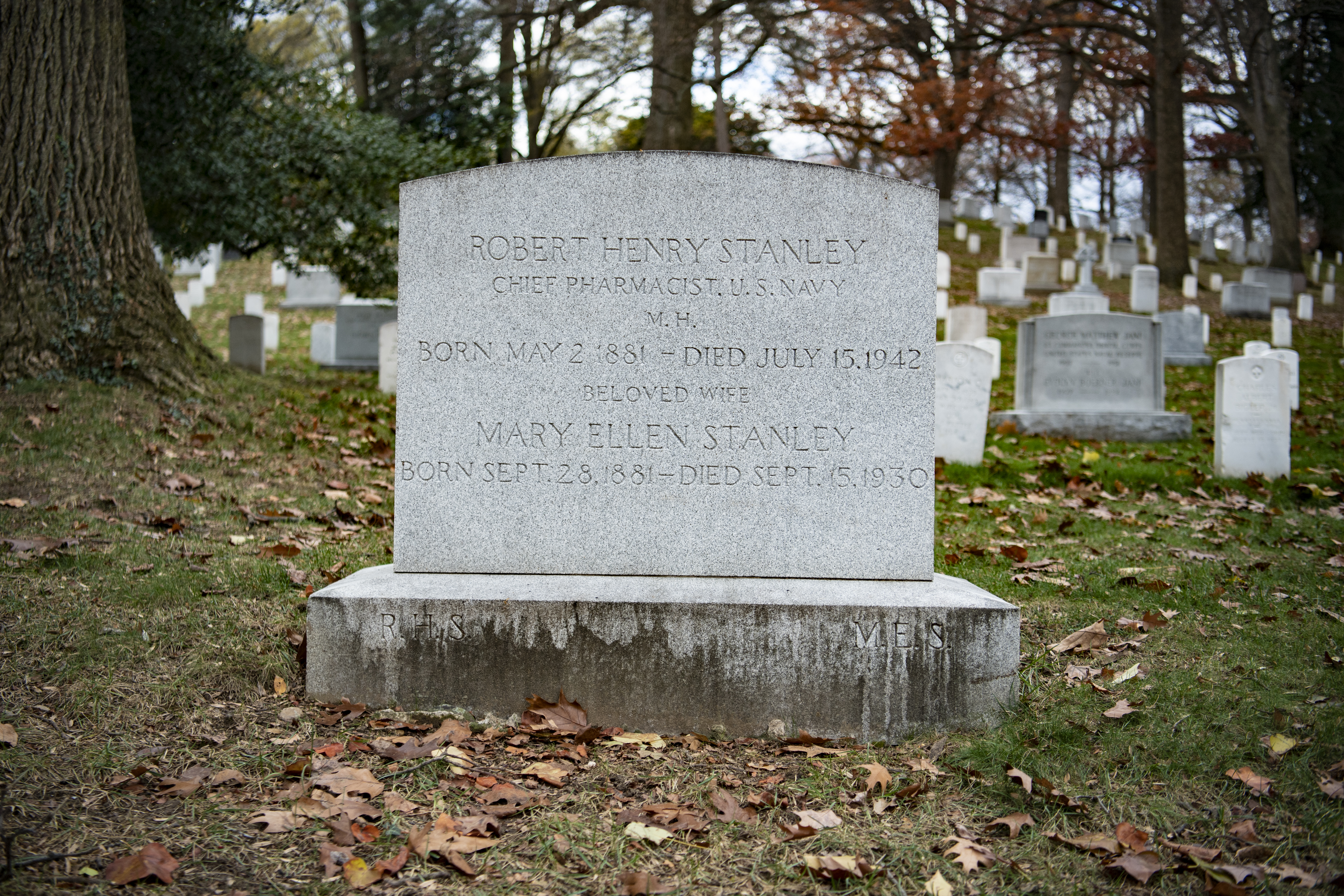
Grave at Arlington National Cemetery

Stanley was born Brooklyn, New York on May 2, 1881. On March 28, 1898, he enlisted in the Navy at age 16 aboard the receiving ship USS Vermont, moored at the Brooklyn Navy Yard. He served as a landsman and participated in the Spanish–American War, which was declared only a month after his enlistment, and the Philippine–American War which began in 1899.

He was serving as a Hospital Apprentice on the USS Newark when the ship arrived in Tientsin, China on May 22, 1900. The Newark had been sent during the China Relief Expedition to help relieve Allied forces fighting in the Boxer Rebellion. On 13 and 20, 21, and June 22 and July 12, in Beijing (then known to Americans as "Peking"), he volunteered to carry messages between the American and British legations despite heavy fire, "Chinese snipers were everywhere and Boxer militants fought viciously."

For these actions, he was awarded the Medal of Honor a year later, on July 19, 1901. The medal was presented to him aboard the armored cruiser USS Brooklyn. Stanley, at age 19, was the youngest Medal of Honor recipient of the Boxer Rebellion. He was also the first member of the U.S. Navy medical community to receive the award.

Stanley was discharged from the Navy on August 8, 1901, which was one month after being awarded the Medal of Honor.

Stanley was a member of the Imperial Order of the Dragon, a fraternal society for veterans of the Boxer Rebellion of all ranks. This organization contrasted with the Military Order of the Dragon whose membership consisted solely of commissioned officers.

=== Later career ===
In 1917, Stanley re-enlisted in order to serve in World War I. During the war, he served on the USS America (ID-3006), a German passenger liner seized by the United States and converted to a troop transport.

Stanley was promoted to the warrant officer rank of Pharmacist on August 5, 5, 1920. He was promoted to Chief Pharmacist on September 24, 1923.

== Retirement and death ==
Stanley retired from the Navy on February 1, 1939. He died in Pensacola, Florida, at age 61, on July 15, 1942. He was buried with his wife Mary Ellen (1881–1930) at Arlington National Cemetery, in Arlington, Virginia.

== Military awards ==
Stanley's military awards and decorations include:

- Medal of Honor
- Navy Good Conduct Medal
- Sampson Medal
- Spanish Campaign Medal
- Philippine Campaign Medal
- China Relief Expedition Medal
- Haitian Campaign Medal
- World War I Victory Medal with "TRANSPORT" clasp

=== Medal of Honor citation ===
His official citation reads:

Citation:

"In action with the relief expedition of the Allied Forces in China during the battles of 13, 20–22 June 1900. Throughout this period and in the presence of the enemy, Stanley distinguished himself by meritorious conduct." "For distinguished conduct in the presence of the enemy in volunteering and carrying messages under fire at Peking, China, 12 July 1900." "Hospital Apprentice Stanley's exceptional fortitude, inspiring initiative, and unrelenting devotion to duty reflect great credit upon himself and were in keeping with the highest traditions of the United States Naval Service."

== See also ==
- List of Medal of Honor recipients
- List of Medal of Honor recipients for the Boxer Rebellion
