= Joseph Clancy (Medal of Honor) =

United States Navy Medal of Honor recipient

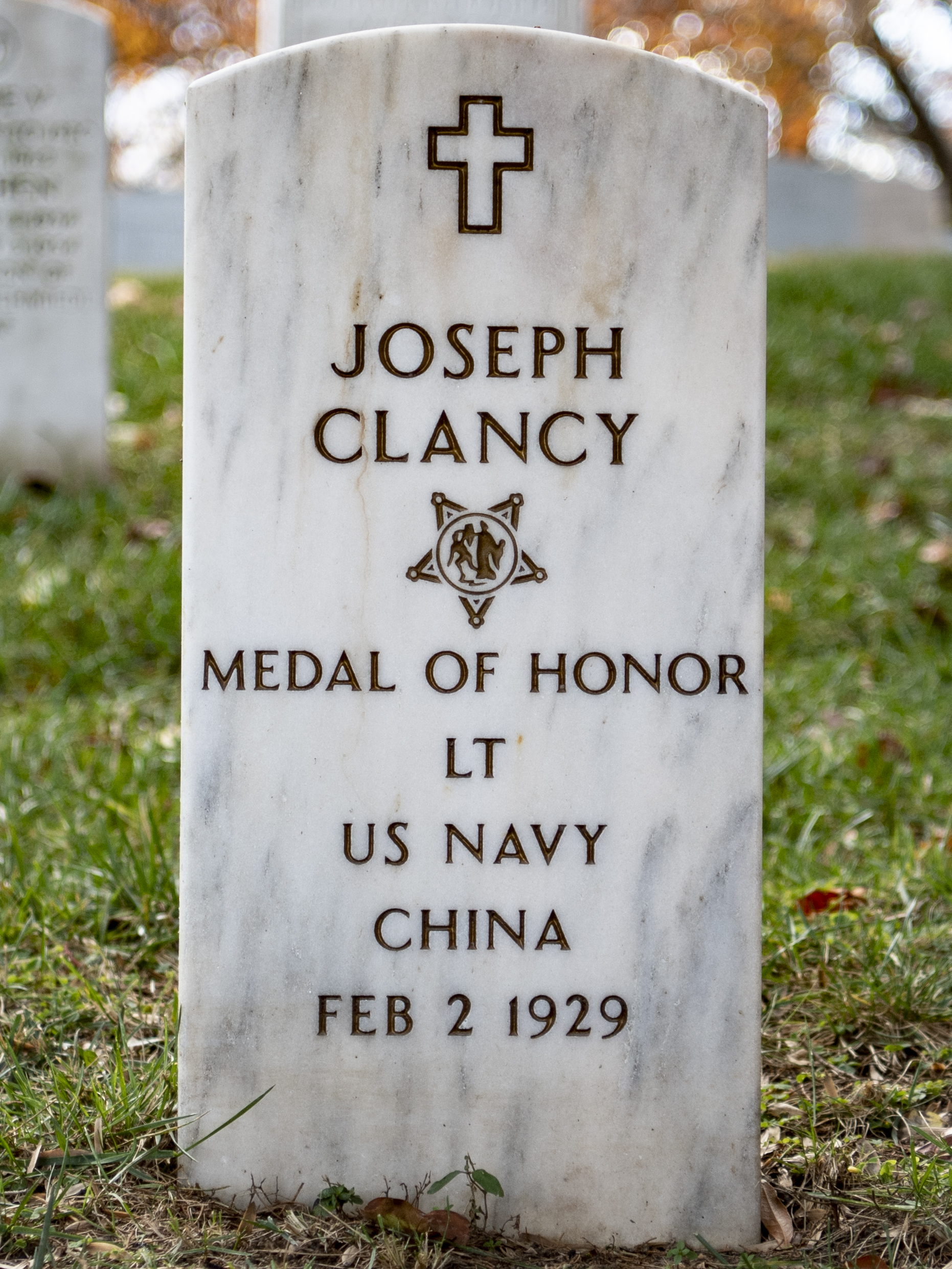
- Grave at Arlington National Cemetery
- Born: September 29, 1863; New York City, US
- Died: February 2, 1929 (aged 65)
- Burial place: Arlington National Cemetery
- Military career
- Allegiance: United States
- Branch: United States Navy
- Service years: 1899–1920
- Rank: Lieutenant
- Unit: USS Newark
- Conflicts: Boxer Rebellion
- Awards: Medal of Honor

Joseph Clancy (September 29, 1863 – February 2, 1929) was an American sailor serving in the United States Navy during Boxer Rebellion who received the Medal of Honor for bravery.

== Biography ==
Clancy was born September 29, 1863, in New York City, New York, and after entering the navy Clancy was sent to China to fight in the Boxer Rebellion.

In 1900 he was a chief boatswains mate and participated in the China Relief Expedition. For heroism during the expedition, he was awarded the Medal of Honor.

He was warranted to the rank of boatswain on May 7, 1901, and promoted to chief boatswain on May 7, 1907. During World War I he was promoted to lieutenant on July 1, 1918.

He died February 2, 1929, and is buried in the Arlington National Cemetery in Arlington, Virginia.

== Awards ==
- Medal of Honor
- Spanish Campaign Medal
- China Relief Expedition Medal
- Victory Medal

=== Medal of Honor citation ===
Rank and organization: Chief Boatswain's Mate, U.S. Navy. Born: 29 September 1863, New York, N.Y. G.O. No.: 55, 19 July 1901.

Citation:

In action with the relief expedition of the Allied forces in China, 13, 20, 21 and 22 June 1900. During this period and in the presence of the enemy, Clancy distinguished himself by his conduct.

== See also ==
- List of Medal of Honor recipients
- List of Medal of Honor recipients for the Boxer Rebellion
