= Sam McAllister =

Sam or Samuel McAllister may refer to:

- Samuel McAllister (1869–1903), American sailor who was awarded the Medal of Honor during the Boxer Rebellion
- Sam McAllister (footballer) (1882–1957), English footballer
- Sam J. McAllister (1903–1975), American college basketball, baseball and football coach

== See also ==
- Sam McAlister, British television producer, barrister and author
