= Kates =

Kates is a surname and a given name. Notable people with the name include:

Surname:

- Bernard Kates (1922–2010), American actor
- Don Kates, (1941–2016), American lawyer and research fellow who focused on promoting gun rights
- Faith Kates (born 1957), American talent agent
- Francis Benjamin Kates, Australian politician in Queensland
- Gary Kates (born 1952), American historian specializing in the European Enlightenment and the French Revolution
- George N. Kates (1895–1990), American exponent of classical Chinese culture and decorative arts
- J. Kates, poet and literary translator
- Josef Kates, born Josef Katz, (1921–2018), Canadian engineer who produced the first automated traffic signalling system
- Kathryn Kates (1948–2022), American actress
- Kimberley Kates (born 1969), American actress and film producer
- Nancy Kates, American filmmaker from San Francisco
- Orin A. Kates (1883–1947), American football and basketball coach and college athletics administrator
- Robert Kates (1929–2018), American geographer
- Thomas Wilbur Kates (1861–1931), American Medal of Honor recipient
- Wendy Kates or Wendy Greengross (1925–2012), British general practitioner and broadcaster

Given name:

- Alix Kates Shulman (born 1932), American writer of fiction, memoirs, and essays

== See also ==
- Kates Bridge, landmark UK settlement on the A15 road, in the parish of Thurlby
- Kates Needle, mountain in the Stikine Icecap region of the Alaska-British Columbia border
