= Edward Allen (Medal of Honor) =

United States Navy Medal of Honor recipient

Edward G. Allen
- Born: December 4, 1859; Amsterdam, Netherlands
- Died: April 16, 1917 (aged 57); Brooklyn, New York, U.S.
- Burial place: Cemetery of the Evergreens
- Military career
- Branch: United States Navy
- Rank: Chief boatswain's mate
- Unit: USS Newark
- Conflict: Boxer Rebellion
- Awards: Medal of Honor

Edward G. Allen (December 4, 1859 – April 16, 1917) was an American sailor serving in the United States Navy during Boxer Rebellion who received the Medal of Honor for bravery.

== Biography ==
Allen was born in Amsterdam, the Netherlands, and after entering the navy Allen was sent to China to fight in the Boxer Rebellion. He died on April 16, 1917, and is buried in the Evergreens Cemetery Brooklyn, New York.

== Medal of Honor citation ==
War Department, General Orders No. 55 (July 19, 1901):

The President of the United States of America, in the name of Congress, takes pleasure in presenting the Medal of Honor to Boatswain's Mate First Class Edward G. Allen, United States Navy, for extraordinary heroism in action while serving with the detachment from the U.S.S. Newark, fighting with the relief expedition of the Allied forces on 13, 20, 21, and 22 June 1900. Boatswain's Mate Allen distinguished himself by meritorious conduct.

== See also ==
- List of Medal of Honor recipients
- List of Medal of Honor recipients for the Boxer Rebellion
