= Burke Hanford =

United States Navy Medal of Honor recipient

Burke G. Hanford
- Born: December 17, 1872; Toledo, Ohio, US
- Died: April 11, 1928 (aged 55); San Diego, California
- Military career
- Allegiance: United States of America
- Branch: United States Navy
- Rank: Chief Machinist
- Unit: USS Newark
- Conflicts: Boxer Rebellion
- Awards: Medal of Honor

Burke Gaius Hanford (December 17, 1872 – April 11, 1928) was an American sailor serving in the United States Navy during the Boxer Rebellion who received the Medal of Honor for bravery.

== Biography ==
Hanford was born December 17, 1872, in Toledo, Ohio, and after entering the navy he was sent as a Machinist First Class to China to fight in the Boxer Rebellion.

He died April 11, 1928, and is buried in Greenwood Memorial Park in San Diego.

== Medal of Honor citation ==
Rank and organization: Machinist First Class, U.S. Navy. Born: 17 December 1872, Toledo, Ohio. Accredited to: Ohio. G.O. No.: 55, 19 July 1901.

Citation:

Served with the relief expedition of the Allied forces in China on 13, 20, 21 and 22 June 1900. In the presence of the enemy during this period, Hanford distinguished himself by meritorious conduct.

== See also ==
- List of Medal of Honor recipients
- List of Medal of Honor recipients for the Boxer Rebellion
