= Hans A. Hansen =

United States Navy Medal of Honor recipient

- Navy Medal of Honor
- Born: April 9, 1877; Korsør, Denmark
- Died: August 23, 1949 (aged 72); Toms River, New Jersey, US
- Burial place: Riverside Cemetery; Toms River, New Jersey
- Military career
- Allegiance: United States of America
- Branch: United States Navy
- Service years: 1899–1903
- Rank: Seaman
- Unit: USS Newark (C-1)
- Conflicts: Boxer Rebellion
- Awards: Medal of Honor

Hans Anton Hansen (April 9, 1877 – August 23, 1949) was an American sailor serving in the United States Navy during the Boxer Rebellion who received the Medal of Honor for bravery. The US sailor who is buried at Arlington National Cemetery is not the Medal of Honor recipient and his grave is mismarked.

== Military service ==
Hansen was born April 9, 1877, in Korsør, Denmark. After immigrating to the United States through the Port of San Francisco on August 29, 1899, he enlisted in United States Navy and was sent as a seaman aboard the USS Newark (C-1) to China to fight in the Boxer Rebellion.

== Medal of Honor citation ==
Rank and organization: Seaman, U.S. Navy. Accredited to: California. G.O. No.: 55, 19 June 1901.

Hansen's official Medal of Honor citation reads:

Served with the relief expedition of the Allied forces in China on 13, 20, 21 and 22 June 1900. In the presence of the enemy during this period, Hansen distinguished himself by meritorious conduct.

== Death and burial ==
Medal of Honor recipient Hans A. Hansen died August 23, 1949, at Toms River, New Jersey, and is buried in Riverside Cemetery, Toms River, New Jersey.

Hansen's obituary in the August 24, 1949 Asbury Park, New Jersey Press newspaper read:

Hans Anton Hansen TOMS RIVER. - Hans Anton Hansen, 71, died yesterday on the porch of his home at 72 Dayton avenue. Mr. Hansen was a veteran of the Spanish–American war and received the Congressional Medal of Honor. He came to Toms River to operate a pigeon farm which he later gave up because of poor health. He was a member of the Leonard A. Wood post of the Spanish–American War Veterans, Lakewood. Mr. Hansen was born in Denmark. He leaves his wife, Mary E. Hansen; a son William A. Hansen, who is on a naval reserve officers training cruise in the South Pacific, and two sisters in Copenhagen, Denmark. Arrangements are in charge of the Anderson, Campbell and Apgar funeral home.

== See also ==
- List of Medal of Honor recipients
- List of Medal of Honor recipients for the Boxer Rebellion
