= Torgerson =

Torgerson is a surname. Notable people with the surname include:

- Brad R. Torgersen (born 1974), American science fiction author
- Carla Torgerson, a vocalist of the American rock band The Walkabouts
- Helena Stone Torgerson (1878–1941), American harpist and composer
- Martin T. Torgerson (1875–1939), American sailor
- Nikolai Torgersen (born 1990), Norwegian artist and author
- Ryan Torgerson (1972–2011), American rower
- Stan Torgerson (1924–2006), American radio personality
