= William F. Hamberger =

United States Navy Medal of Honor recipient

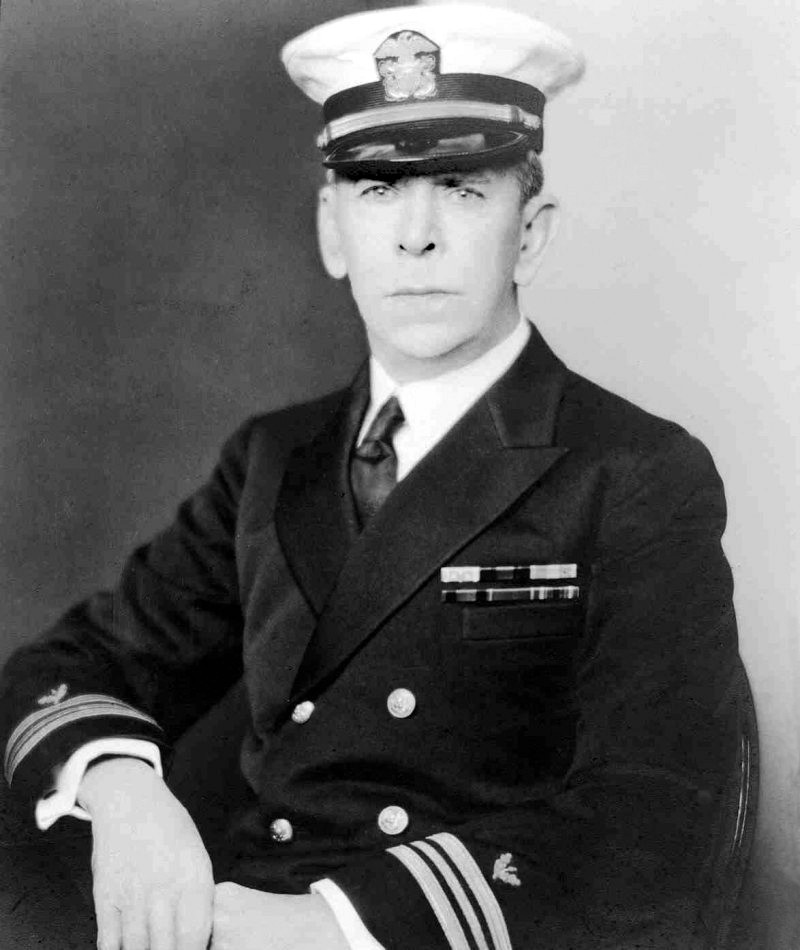
- Born: January 5, 1871; Newark, New Jersey, US
- Died: September 1, 1937 (aged 66)
- Burial place: Arlington National Cemetery
- Military career
- Allegiance: United States
- Branch: United States Navy
- Service years: 1892–1932
- Rank: Lieutenant Commander
- Unit: USS Newark
- Conflicts: Boxer Rebellion; Occupation of Veracruz
- Awards: Medal of Honor

William Francis Hamberger (January 5, 1871 – September 1, 1937) was an American sailor serving in the United States Navy during the Boxer Rebellion who received the Medal of Honor for bravery.

== Biography ==
Hamberger was born January 5, 1871, in Newark, New Jersey, and after entering the navy Hamberger was sent as a Chief Carpenter's Mate to China to fight in the Boxer Rebellion.

He died September 1, 1937, and is buried in the Arlington National Cemetery in Arlington, Virginia.

== Medal of Honor citation ==
Rank and organization: Chief Carpenter's Mate, U.S. Navy. Born: 5 August 1870, Newark, N.J. Accredited to: New Jersey. G.O. No.: 55, 19 July 1901.

Citation:

Fighting with the relief expedition of the Allied forces on 13, 20, 21 and 22 June 1900, Hamberger distinguished himself by meritorious conduct.

== See also ==
- List of Medal of Honor recipients
- List of Medal of Honor recipients for the Boxer Rebellion
