= John Chatham =

John Chatham may refer to:

- John Chatham (politician) (1866–1925), member of the Victorian Legislative Assembly
- John Purnell Chatham (1872–1914), American sailor and Medal of Honor recipient
