= Edwin Nelson Appleton =

United States Marine Corps Medal of Honor recipient

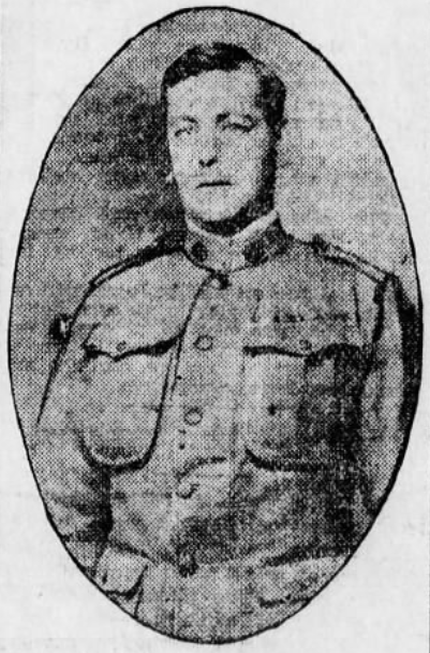
- Appleton c. 1917
- Born: August 28, 1877; Brooklyn, New York, US
- Died: September 26, 1937 (aged 60)
- Burial place: Green-Wood Cemetery Brooklyn, New York
- Military career
- Allegiance: United States of America
- Branch: United States Marine Corps; United States Army
- Service years: 1898–1903 (Marine Corps)
- Rank: First Sergeant (Marine Corps); Captain (Army)
- Conflicts: Boxer Rebellion
- Awards: Medal of Honor

Edwin N. Appleton (August 28, 1877 – September 26, 1937) was an American Marine who received the Medal of Honor for bravery during the Boxer Rebellion.

== Biography ==
Appleton was born August 28, 1877, in Brooklyn, New York, and enlisted in the US Marine Corps on January 14, 1898. He was first assigned to the auxiliary cruiser USS Dixie during the Spanish-American War from May to August 1898. While onboard Dixie he participated in the bombardment of Manzanillo, Cuba.

He then transferred to the cruiser USS Newark, onboard which he served in Philippine Insurrection and the Boxer Rebellion in China.

He was sent as a corporal to China to fight in the Boxer Rebellion. On June 20, 1900, while fighting in Tientsin, China he crossed the river in a small boat while under heavy enemy fire and assisted in destroying several buildings occupied by the enemy.

He was promoted to the rank of first sergeant in the Marine Corps on July 1, 1902 and was discharged on January 13, 1903.

He enlisted in the U.S. Army on February 18, 1908 at Fort Slocum on David's Island in New York and was assigned to Company E of the 5th Infantry located at Plattsburg Barracks in upstate New York.

He died September 26, 1937, and is buried in Green-Wood Cemetery in Brooklyn, New York.

== Awards ==
- Medal of Honor
- Sampson Medal
- Spanish Campaign Medal
- Philippine Campaign Medal
- China Campaign Medal

=== Medal of Honor citation ===
Rank and organization: Corporal, U.S. Marine Corps. Born: 29 August 1876, Brooklyn, N.Y. Accredited to: New York. G.O. No.: 84, 22 March 1902.

Citation:

In action against the enemy at Tientsin, China, 20 June 1900. Crossing the river in a small boat while under heavy enemy fire, Appleton assisted in destroying buildings occupied by the enemy.

== See also ==
- List of Medal of Honor recipients
- List of Medal of Honor recipients for the Boxer Rebellion
