= John Mapes Adams =

United States Marine Corps Medal of Honor recipient

- Born: October 11, 1871; Haverhill, Massachusetts, US
- Died: January 6, 1921 (aged 49); Fort Wadsworth, New York, US
- Burial place: Cypress Hills National Cemetery, Brooklyn, New York
- Spouse: Della Isabel Joyce (m. 1918)
- Military career
- Allegiance: United States
- Branch: United States Marine Corps
- Rank: Sergeant
- Conflicts: Boxer Rebellion
- Awards: Medal of Honor

John Mapes Adams (October 11, 1871 – January 6, 1921) was an American Marine who received the Medal of Honor for valor during the Boxer Rebellion. His birth name was George Lawrence Day, but he served in the Marine Corps under the alias of John Mapes Adams.

== Biography ==
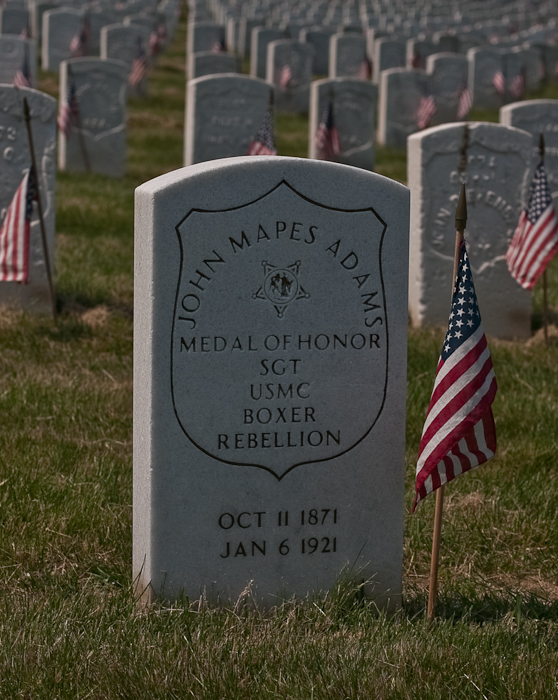
Grave at Cypress Hills National Cemetery

John Mapes Adams was born October 11, 1871, in Haverhill, Massachusetts. He attended Phillips Exeter Academy, then entered Harvard College in 1889, but left before graduating.

On July 13, 1900, while a sergeant in the United States Marine Corps he "distinguished himself by meritorious conduct" in battle at Tianjin, China (then Tientsin). His Medal of Honor was issued on July 19, the next year. He re-enlisted in Panama on October 11, 1902.

As of May 20, 1903 he had been promoted to the rank of gunnery sergeant and was hospitalized in Washington, D.C.

He married Della Isabel Joyce in Newport, Rhode Island on August 14, 1918.

Adams died from heart disease at Fort Wadsworth, New York on January 6, 1921. He was buried at the Cypress Hills National Cemetery in Brooklyn.

== Medal of Honor citation ==
Adams Medal of Honor citation:

Rank and organization: Sergeant, U.S. Marine Corps. Born: October 11, 1871, Haverhill, Mass. Accredited to: Massachusetts. G.O. No.: 55, July 19, 1901.

Citation:

In the presence of the enemy during the battle near Tientsin, China, 13 July 1900, Adams distinguished himself by meritorious conduct.

== See also ==
- List of Medal of Honor recipients
- List of Medal of Honor recipients for the Boxer Rebellion
- U.S. Marine Corps Medal of Honor recipients for actions on same day and place
  - Harry C. Adriance
  - Alexander J. Foley
