= Martin Hunt =

Martin Hunt may refer to:

- Martin Hunt (Medal of Honor), United States Marine Corps private and Medal of Honor recipient
- Martin Hunt (politician), Nauruan politician
- Marty Hunt, Australian politician
