= Jay Williams =

Jay Williams may refer to:

== Music ==
- J. Williams (singer) (born 1986), New Zealand R&B singer
- Jay Williams, retired British musician, former member of British band Love City Groove (1994–96)
- Jay Williams, guitarist and composer, former member of British band The Broken Family Band (2002–2009)

== Sports ==
- Jay Williams (American football) (born 1971), professional football player
- Jay Williams (basketball) (born 1981), also known as Jason Williams, professional basketball player
- Jay Williams (footballer) (born 2000), English footballer for Harrogate Town

== Other people ==
- Jay Williams (author) (1914–1978), author of children's books
- Jay Williams (Medal of Honor) (1872–1938), American sailor and Medal of Honor recipient
- Jay Williams (politician) (born 1971), mayor of Youngstown, Ohio

== See also ==
- Jason Williams (disambiguation)
