= Jason Williams =

Jason Williams may refer to:

== Sports ==
=== Basketball ===
- Jason Williams (basketball, born 1975), American basketball player; played collegiately at Marshall, Florida and multiple teams in the NBA
- Jason Williams (basketball, born 1979), American basketball player; played collegiately at Radford
- Jason Williams (basketball, born 1983), American basketball player; played collegiately at UTEP
- Jason Williams or Jay Williams (basketball) (born 1981), American basketball player; played collegiately at Duke and professionally for the Chicago Bulls
- Jayson Williams (born 1968), American basketball player

=== Other sports ===
- Jason Williams (American football) (born 1986), American football player
- Jason Williams (baseball) (born 1974), American baseball player
- Jason Williams (cricketer) (born 1976), West Indian cricketer
- Jason Williams (footballer, born 1984), Bermudian footballer
- Jason Williams (footballer, born 1995), English footballer
- Jason Williams (ice hockey) (born 1980), Canadian ice hockey player
- Jason Williams (rugby league, born 1966), New Zealand rugby league player from Christchurch
- Jason Williams (rugby league, born 1981), New Zealand rugby league player from Auckland

== Others ==
- Jason Williams (actor), actor, writer, and director
- Jason Aldine Williams, known professionally as Jason Aldean (born 1977), American country singer
- Jason Williams (politician) (born 1972), district attorney of New Orleans

== See also ==
- Jay Williams (disambiguation)
