= Joseph Mitchell (Medal of Honor) =

United States Navy Medal of Honor recipient

Joseph A. Mitchell
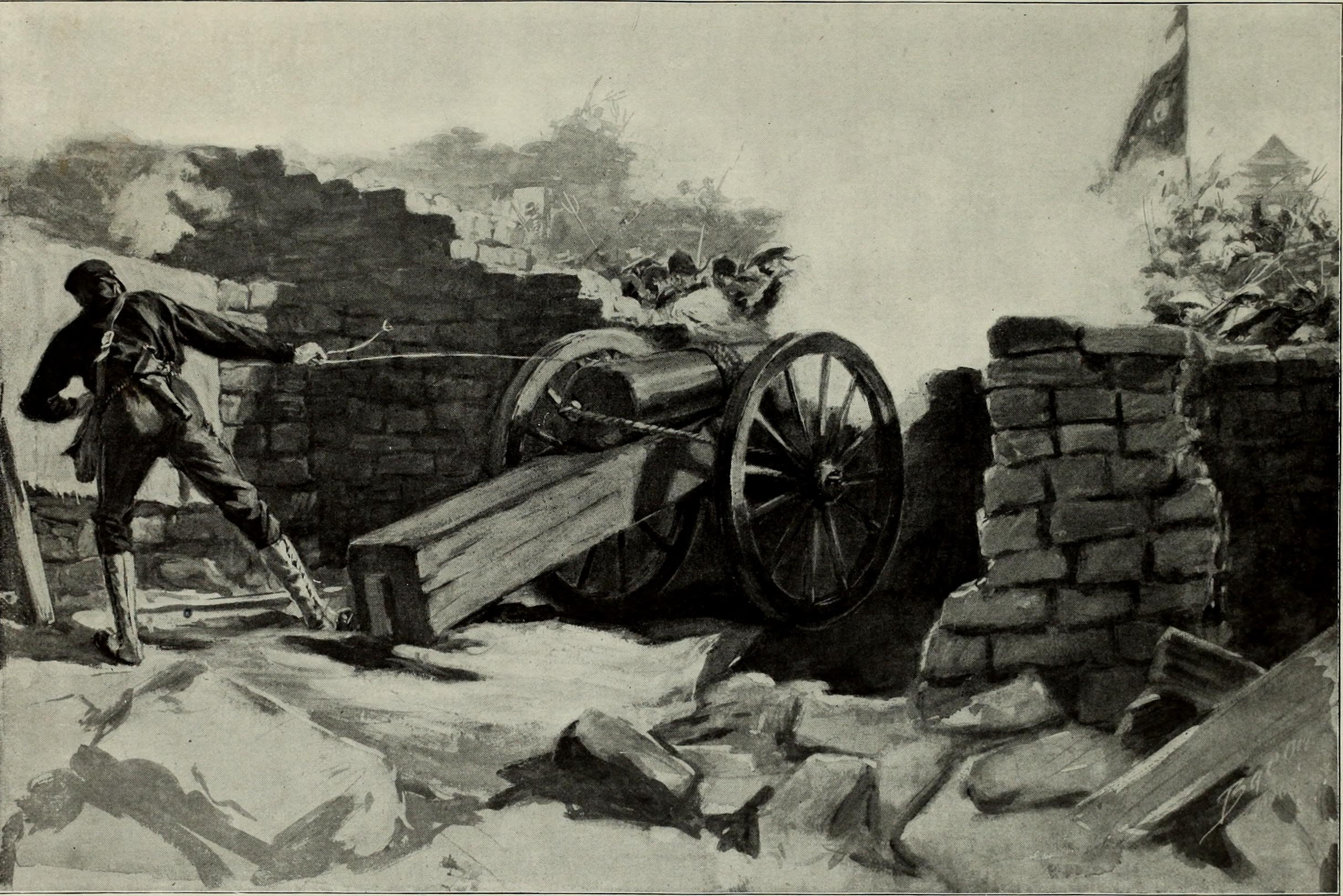
- Mitchell firing "The Old International"
- Born: November 27, 1876; Philadelphia, Pennsylvania, U.S.
- Died: June 9, 1925 (aged 48); Philadelphia, Pennsylvania, U.S.
- Burial place: Saint Pauls Cemetery; Portsmouth, Virginia, US
- Military career
- Allegiance: United States of America
- Branch: United States Navy
- Rank: Gunner's Mate First Class
- Conflicts: Boxer Rebellion
- Awards: Medal of Honor

Joseph Andrew Mitchell (November 27, 1876 – June 9, 1925) was an American sailor serving in the United States Navy during the Boxer Rebellion who received the Medal of Honor for bravery.

== Biography ==
Mitchell was born November 27, 1876, in Philadelphia, Pennsylvania, and after entering the navy he was sent as a Gunner's Mate First Class to China to fight in the Boxer Rebellion.

He died June 9, 1925.

== Medal of Honor citation ==
Rank and organization: Gunner's Mate First Class, U.S. Navy. Born: 27 November 1876, Philadelphia, Pa. Accredited to: Pennsylvania. G.O. No.: 55, 19 July 1901.

Citation:

In the presence of the enemy during the battle of Peking, China, 12 July 1900, Mitchell distinguished himself by meritorious conduct.

== See also ==
- List of Medal of Honor recipients
- List of Medal of Honor recipients for the Boxer Rebellion
