= William Louis Carr =

United States Marine Corps Medal of Honor recipient

- Born: April 1, 1878; Peabody, Massachusetts, US
- Died: April 14, 1921 (aged 43); Sandusky, Ohio, U.S.
- Military career
- Allegiance: United States
- Branch: United States Marine Corps
- Service years: 1898–1903
- Rank: Corporal
- Conflicts: Boxer Rebellion
- Awards: Medal of Honor

William L. Carr (April 1, 1878 – April 14, 1921) was an American private serving in the United States Marine Corps during the Boxer Rebellion who received the Medal of Honor for bravery.

== Biography ==
Carr was born April 1, 1878, in Peabody, Massachusetts, and enlisted in the Marine Corps from Boston on June 7, 1898. After entering the Marine Corps he was sent to fight in the Chinese Boxer Rebellion.

He received his medal for his actions in Peking from July 21 – August 17, 1900. The medal was presented to him December 11, 1901. He was discharged from the Marine Corps in Boston as a corporal on June 10, 1903.

He died April 14, 1921.

== Medal of Honor citation ==
Rank and organization: Private, U.S. Marine Corps. Born: 1 April 1875, Peabody, Mass. Accredited to: Massachusetts. G.O. No.: 55, 19 July 1901.

Citation:

In action at Peking, China, 21 July to 17 August 1900. Throughout this action and in the presence of the enemy, Carr distinguished himself by his conduct.

== See also ==
- List of Medal of Honor recipients
- List of Medal of Honor recipients for the Boxer Rebellion
