= Oscar J. Upham =

American soldier (1871–1949)

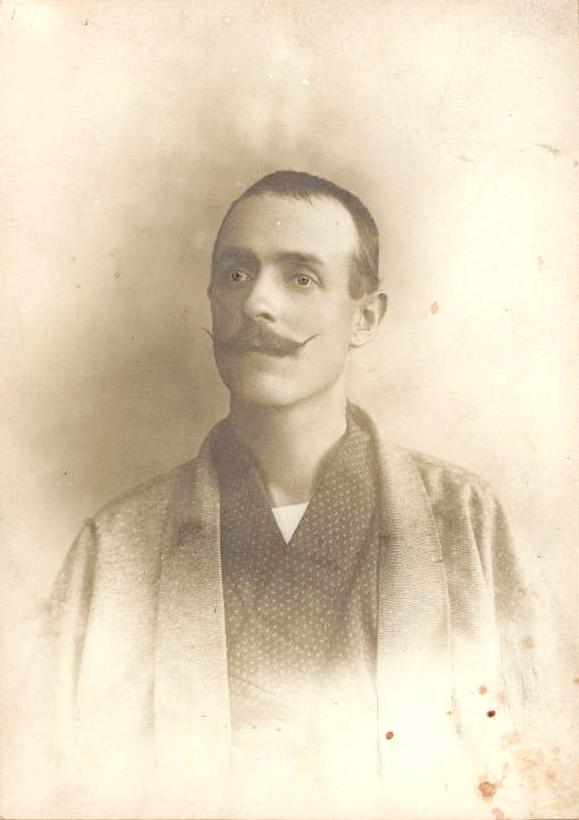
- Private Oscar J. Upham, ca. 1900
- Born: Oscar John Jefferson Upham; December 14, 1871; Toledo, Ohio, U.S.
- Died: February 18, 1949 (aged 77); Guthrie, Oklahoma, U.S.
- Burial place: Summit View Cemetery Guthrie, Oklahoma
- Military career
- Allegiance: United States
- Branch: United States Marine Corps
- Service years: 1896–1901
- Rank: Private
- Conflicts: Spanish–American War; Battle of Santiago de Cuba; Boxer Rebellion; Siege of the International Legations
- Awards: Medal of Honor Oklahoma Military Hall Honor Oklahoma Military Hall of Fame
- Other work: Retired Post Officer 36 yrs

Oscar John Jefferson Upham (December 14, 1871 – February 18, 1949) was a private serving in the United States Marine Corps during the Boxer Rebellion who received the Medal of Honor for bravery.

In addition to his service during the Boxer rebellion, he also served in the Spanish–American War and is credited as shooting the first shot from the USS Oregon that portion of the Spanish–American War. In the 26th Induction Ceremony, November 1, 2025, Oscar Upham was inducted into the Oklahoma Military Hall of Fame.

== Biography ==
Upham was born December 14, 1871, in Toledo, Ohio. On April 22, 1889, along with his parents, staked land in the Oklahoma Land Run, in Guthrie Oklahoma, the Territorial Capital. Oscar traveled to Illinois (because Oklahoma was not a state until 1907 and had no office to enlist into the Marines) and enlisted into the Marine Corps in 1896 at the age of 25. He was stationed at Mare Island, California. Within a year he was ordered to sea duty aboard the USS Oregon. While Upham was on duty, the Spanish fleet exited the harbor at Santiago, Cuba, on July 3, 1898. Upham was serving as a powder monkey for one of the six-inch guns on the Oregon's bridge; he was given the order to shoot, and Upham was accredited as shooting the first shot after war had been declared by America in the Spanish–American War.

During the Boxer Rebellion in 1900, he and his fellow Marines were erecting barricades in Peking, China, when the Chinese rebels surrounded the group and settled down for a three-month siege. A quotation from his diary, kept during the siege, reads: "We are holding out no hope for rescue and many do not give rescue a second thought." He was earned the Medal of Honor for this action — one of 33 Marines to earn the award during the rebellion. He received the Medal of Honor for his action in Peking, China from on July 21 – August 17, 1900.

During his enlistment, Upham kept a detailed diary of events. Portions of that diary have been published multiple times. Upham's rejoined his parents after his service in Guthrie, Ok. He retired from the US Postal Service after 34 years and he died February 14, 1949, in Guthrie, Oklahoma, where many of his family still live today.

On April 1, 2025, Oscar J Upham was inducted into the Oklahoma Military Hall of Honor. On his behalf, his three great granddaughters accepted his induction certificate and medal. Oscar’s military service is displayed in multiple museums including The Oklahoma Territorial Museum in Guthrie, Oklahoma and The US Marine Museum in Virginia. Smithsonian Museum of American History in Washington DC.

== Medal of Honor citation ==
Rank and organization: Private, U.S. Marine Corps. Born: January 14, 1871, Toledo, Ohio. Accredited to: Illinois. G.O. No.: 55, July 19, 1901.

Citation:

In the presence of the enemy at Peking, China, 21 July to 17 August 1900. Although under a heavy fire from the enemy during this period, Upham assisted in the erection of barricades.

== See also ==
- List of Medal of Honor recipients
- List of Medal of Honor recipients for the Boxer Rebellion
