= Karl Thomas =

United States Navy Medal of Honor recipient

- Born: March 17, 1871; Germany
- Died: July 18, 1900 (aged 29); Taku Forts, China
- Burial place: San Francisco National Cemetery, San Francisco, California
- Military career
- Allegiance: United States of America
- Branch: United States Navy
- Service years: 1895–1900
- Rank: Coxswain
- Conflicts: Boxer Rebellion
- Awards: Medal of Honor

Karl Thomas (March 17, 1871 – July 18, 1900) was an American sailor serving in the United States Navy during the Boxer Rebellion who received the Medal of Honor for bravery.

== Biography ==
Thomas was born March 17, 1871, in Germany, and after entering the navy in 1895 he was sent as an Coxswain to China to fight in the Boxer Rebellion.

He died July 18, 1900, and is buried in San Francisco National Cemetery, San Francisco, California.

== Medal of Honor citation ==
Rank and organization: Coxswain, U.S. Navy. Born: 17 March 1871, Germany. Accredited to: New York. G.O. No.: 55, 19 July 1901.

Citation:

In action with the relief expedition of the Allied forces in China 13, 20, 21, and 22 June 1900. During this period and in the presence of the enemy, Thomas distinguished himself by meritorious conduct.

== See also ==
- List of Medal of Honor recipients
- List of Medal of Honor recipients for the Boxer Rebellion
