= Martin T. Torgerson =

United States Navy Medal of Honor recipient

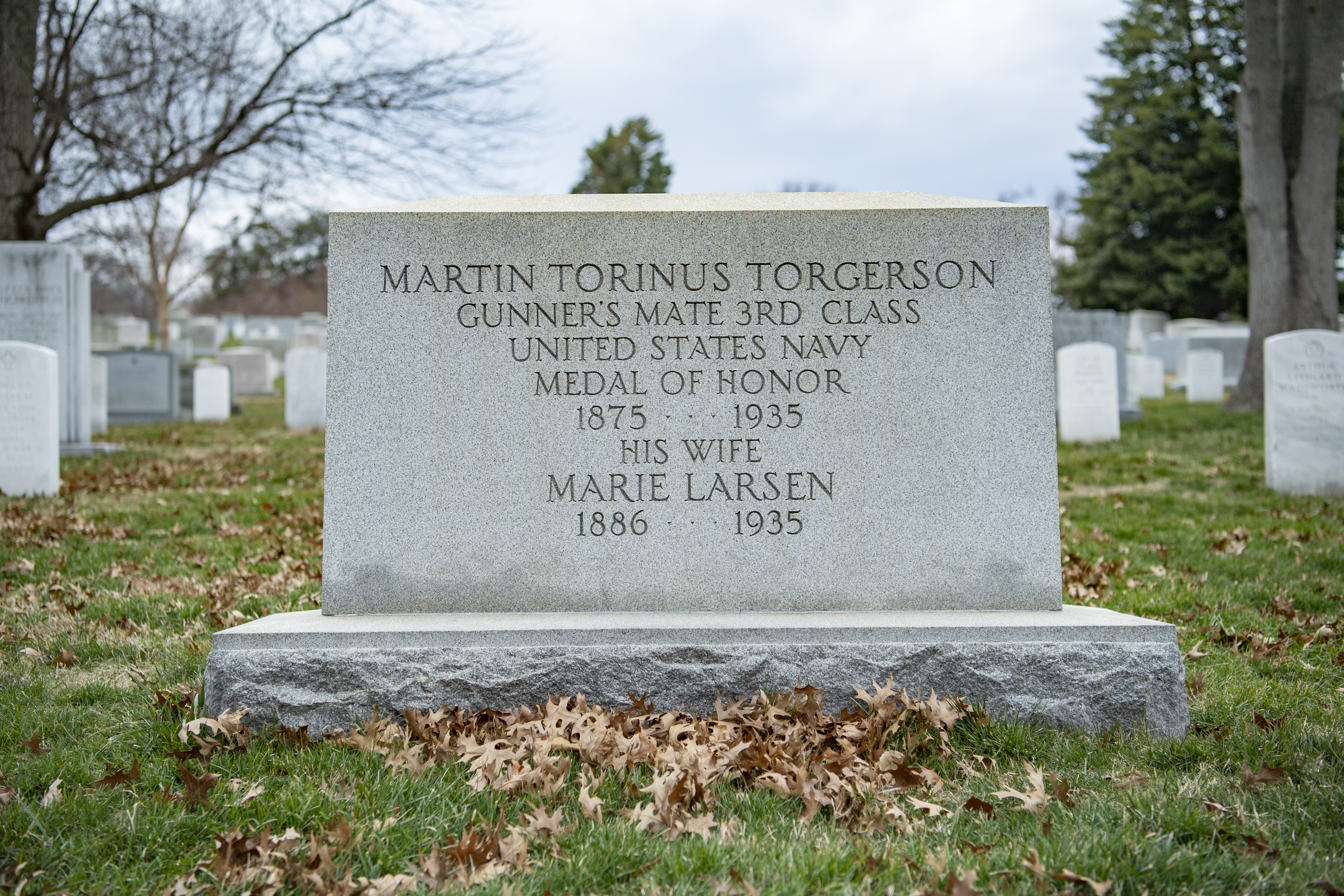
- Grave at Arlington National Cemetery
- Born: November 7, 1875; Norway
- Died: June 12, 1935 (aged 59); Rosedale, Queens, New York
- Burial place: Arlington National Cemetery
- Military career
- Allegiance: United States of America
- Branch: United States Navy
- Rank: Gunner's Mate Third Class
- Unit: USS Newark
- Conflicts: Boxer Rebellion
- Awards: Medal of Honor

Martin Torinus Torgerson (November 7, 1875 – June 12, 1935) was an American sailor serving in the United States Navy during the Boxer Rebellion who received the Medal of Honor for bravery.

== Biography ==
Torgerson was born November 7, 1875, in Oleesen, Norway, and after entering the navy he was sent as an Gunner's Mate Third Class to China to fight in the Boxer Rebellion.

He died June 12, 1935, and is buried at Arlington National Cemetery, in Arlington, Virginia. His wife, Marie Larsen Torgerson is buried with him.

His son, Harry Torgerson, later served with the Paramarines in World War II, and was awarded the Silver Star for actions during the Battle of Guadalcanal in 1942.

== Medal of Honor citation ==
Rank and organization. Gunner's Mate Third Class, U.S. Navy. Born: 7 November 1875, Oleesen, Norway. Accredited to. Virginia. G.O. No.: 55, 19 July 1901.

Citation:

In action with the relief expedition of the Allied Forces in China, 13, 20, 21, and 22 June 1900. During this period and in the presence of the enemy, Torgerson distinguished himself by meritorious conduct.

== See also ==
- List of Medal of Honor recipients
- List of Medal of Honor recipients for the Boxer Rebellion
