= James A. Smith (Medal of Honor) =

United States Navy Medal of Honor recipient

James Aloysius Smith
- Born: September 2, 1880; New York
- Died: November 9, 1944 (aged 64); New York
- Military career
- Allegiance: United States of America
- Branch: United States Navy
- Rank: Landsman
- Conflicts: Boxer Rebellion
- Awards: Medal of Honor

James Aloysius Smith (September 2, 1880 – November 9, 1944) was an American sailor serving in the United States Navy during the Boxer Rebellion who received the Medal of Honor for bravery. He was later a decorated member of the New York City Fire Department, and an early member of Rescue 1.

== Early life ==
Smith was born on September 2, 1880, in New York. After entering the Navy, he was sent as a landsman to China to fight in the Boxer Rebellion.

== Later life ==
After serving in the navy, Smith became a fireman with Rescue 1 of the New York City Fire Department. He earned a commendation for his participation in the fire and rescue efforts aboard the USS O-5 in the Brooklyn Navy Yard on October 6, 1918.

== Medal of Honor citation ==
Rank and organization: Landsman, U.S. Navy. Born: 2 September 1880, New York. Accredited to: New York. G.O. No.: 55, 19 July 1901.

Citation:

In action with the relief expedition of the Allied forces in China during the battles of 13, 20, 21, and 22 June 1900. Throughout this period and in the presence of the enemy, Smith distinguished himself by meritorious conduct.

== See also ==
- List of Medal of Honor recipients for the Boxer Rebellion
