= Harry Westley Orndoff =

United States Marine Corps Medal of Honor recipient

- Born: November 8, 1875; Sandusky, Ohio, US
- Died: July 14, 1938 (aged 61); Cleveland, Ohio, US
- Burial place: Highland Park Cemetery, Highland Hills, Ohio
- Military career
- Allegiance: United States
- Branch: United States Marine Corps
- Service years: 1896–1902
- Rank: Private
- Conflicts: Boxer Rebellion
- Awards: Medal of Honor

Harry W. Orndoff (November 8, 1875 – July 14, 1938) was an American private serving in the United States Marine Corps during the Boxer Rebellion who received the Medal of Honor for bravery.

== Biography ==
Orndoff was born November 8, 1875, in Sandusky, Ohio and enlisted into the Marine Corps from Mare Island, California on October 17, 1896. After entering the Marine Corps he was sent to fight in the Chinese Boxer Rebellion. He received the Medal for his actions in China on 13 and 20–22 June 1900 and it was presented to him December 10, 1901. He was discharged from the Marines due to a medical survey on January 12, 1902. He died July 14, 1938, and is buried in Highland Park Cemetery, Highland Hills, Ohio.

== Medal of Honor citation ==
Rank and organization: Private, U.S. Marine Corps. Born: 9 November 1872, Sandusky, Ohio. Accredited to: California. G.O. No.: 55, 19 July 1901.

Citation:

In action with the relief expedition of the Allied forces in China, 13, 20, 21, and 22 June 1900. During this period and in the presence of the enemy, Orndoff distinguished himself by meritorious conduct.

== See also ==
- List of Medal of Honor recipients
- List of Medal of Honor recipients for the Boxer Rebellion
