= Frank Elmer Smith =

United States Navy Medal of Honor recipient

Frank E. Smith
- Born: August 22, 1864; Boston, Massachusetts, US
- Died: March 4, 1943 (aged 78); Boston, Massachusetts, US
- Military career
- Allegiance: United States
- Branch: United States Navy
- Rank: Oiler
- Conflicts: Boxer Rebellion
- Awards: Medal of Honor

Frank Elmer Smith (August 22, 1864 – March 4, 1943) was an American sailor serving in the United States Navy during the Boxer Rebellion who received the Medal of Honor for bravery.

== Biography ==
Smith was born August 22, 1864, in Boston, Massachusetts, and after entering the navy he was sent as an Oiler to China to fight in the Boxer Rebellion. Smith died on March 4, 1943.

== Medal of Honor citation ==
Rank and organization: Oiler, U.S. Navy. Born: 22 August 1864, Boston, Mass. Accredited to: Virginia. G.O. No.: 55, 19 July 1901.

Citation:

In action with the relief expedition of the Allied Forces in China during the battles of 13, 20, 21, and 22 June 1900. Throughout this period and in the presence of the enemy, Smith distinguished himself by meritorious conduct.

== See also ==
- List of Medal of Honor recipients
- List of Medal of Honor recipients for the Boxer Rebellion
