= Albert Moore (marine) =

United States Marine Corps Medal of Honor recipient

- Born: December 26, 1862; Merced, California, U.S.
- Died: September 14, 1916 (aged 53); Port Mason, California, U.S.
- Military career
- Allegiance: United States
- Branch: United States Marine Corps
- Service years: 1898–1903
- Rank: First Sergeant
- Conflicts: Boxer Rebellion; Siege of the International Legations
- Awards: Medal of Honor

Albert Moore (December 26, 1862 – September 14, 1916) was an American private serving in the United States Marine Corps during the Boxer Rebellion who received the Medal of Honor for bravery.

== Biography ==
Moore was born December 26, 1862, in Merced, California and enlisted into the Marine Corps from Mare island, California January 18, 1898. After entering the marines he was sent to fight in the Chinese Boxer Rebellion.

He received the Medal for his actions in Peking, China from July 21 – August 17, 1900, and it was presented to him July 19, 1901. He was discharged from the Marine Corps in San Francisco, California January 17, 1903, and died September 14, 1916.

== Medal of Honor citation ==
Rank and organization: Private, U.S. Marine Corps. Born: 25 December 1862, Merced, Calif. Accredited to: California. G.O. No.:55, 19 July 1901.

Citation:

In the presence of the enemy during the battle of Peking, China, 21 July to 17 August 1900. Although under a heavy fire from the enemy, Moore assisted in the erection of barricades.

== See also ==
- List of Medal of Honor recipients
- List of Medal of Honor recipients for the Boxer Rebellion
