= Carl Emil Petersen =

United States Navy Medal of Honor recipient

Carl E. Petersen
- Born: August 24, 1875; Hamburg, Germany
- Died: November 17, 1971 (aged 96); Edison, New Jersey, U.S.
- Burial place: Clover Leaf Memorial Park; Woodbridge, New Jersey
- Military career
- Allegiance: United States of America
- Branch: United States Navy
- Service years: 1898 - 1902
- Rank: Chief Machinist
- Unit: USS Newark
- Conflicts: Boxer Rebellion
- Awards: Medal of Honor

Carl Emil Petersen (August 24, 1875 – November 17, 1971) was an American sailor serving in the United States Navy during the Boxer Rebellion who received the Medal of Honor for bravery.

== Biography ==
Petersen was born August 24, 1875, in Hamburg, Germany, and after entering the navy in 1898 he was sent as a Chief Machinist to China to fight in the Boxer Rebellion. He left the navy in 1902.

He died November 17, 1971, and is buried in Clover Leaf Memorial Park in Woodbridge, New Jersey.

== Medal of Honor citation ==
Rank and organization: Chief Machinist, U.S. Navy. Place and date: Peking, China, 28 June to 17 August 1900. Entered service at: New Jersey. Born: 24 August 1875, Hamburg, Germany. G.O. No.: 55, 19 July 1901.

Citation:

In the presence of the enemy during the action at Peking, China, 28 June to 17 August 1900. During this period Chief Machinist Petersen distinguished himself by meritorious conduct.

== See also ==
- List of Medal of Honor recipients
- List of Medal of Honor recipients for the Boxer Rebellion
