= John Purnell Chatham =

United States Navy Medal of Honor recipient

John P. Chatham
- Born: July 2, 1872; Worcester County, Maryland, U.S.
- Died: October 3, 1914 (aged 42); Salisbury, Maryland, U.S.
- Military career
- Allegiance: United States
- Branch: United States Navy
- Rank: Gunner's Mate Second Class
- Unit: USS Newark
- Conflicts: Boxer Rebellion
- Awards: Medal of Honor

John Purnell Chatham (July 2, 1872 – October 3, 1914) was an American sailor serving in the United States Navy during Boxer Rebellion who received the Medal of Honor for bravery.

== Biography ==
Chatham was born July 2, 1872, in Worcester County, Maryland and after entering the US Navy, Chatham was sent to China to fight in the Boxer Rebellion.

At the time of his death, Chatham was an engineer at Jackson Brothers Company's mills. He died from suicide by gun on October 3, 1914, at the mill in Salisbury, Maryland. He is buried in Parsons Cemetery in Salisbury.

== Medal of Honor citation ==
Rank and organization: Gunner's Mate Second Class, U.S. Navy
Born: 2 July 1872, Worcester County, Md
Accredited to: Maryland
G.O. No.: 55, 19 July 1901

Citation:

In action with the relief expedition of the Allied Forces in China, 13, 20, 21 and 22 June 1900. During this period and in the presence of the enemy, Chatham distinguished himself by his conduct.

== See also ==
- List of Medal of Honor recipients
- List of Medal of Honor recipients for the Boxer Rebellion
