= Louis Bowem Lawton =

United States Army Medal of Honor recipient

Louis Bowen Lawton
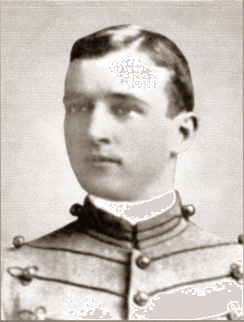
- Louis Bowem Lawton
- Born: March 13, 1872; Independence, Iowa, US
- Died: July 9, 1949 (aged 77); Skaneateles, New York, US
- Military career
- Allegiance: United States
- Branch: United States Army
- Service years: 1893 – 1903
- Rank: Major
- Unit: 9th Infantry Regiment
- Conflicts: Boxer Rebellion; Battle of Tientsin (WIA)
- Awards: Medal of Honor; Silver Star (2)

Louis Bowen Lawton (March 13, 1872 – July 9, 1949) was a United States Army officer during the Boxer Rebellion who earned the Medal of Honor for his actions at Tientsin, China on July 13, 1900. An 1893 graduate of West Point, Lawton was a 1st Lieutenant at Tientsin. He was awarded the Medal of Honor on March 11, 1902.

== Medal of Honor citation ==
Carried a message and guided reinforcements across a wide, fireswept space despite being wounded three times.

== See also ==
- List of Medal of Honor recipients for the Boxer Rebellion
