= Frank Albert Young =

United States Marine Corps Medal of Honor recipient

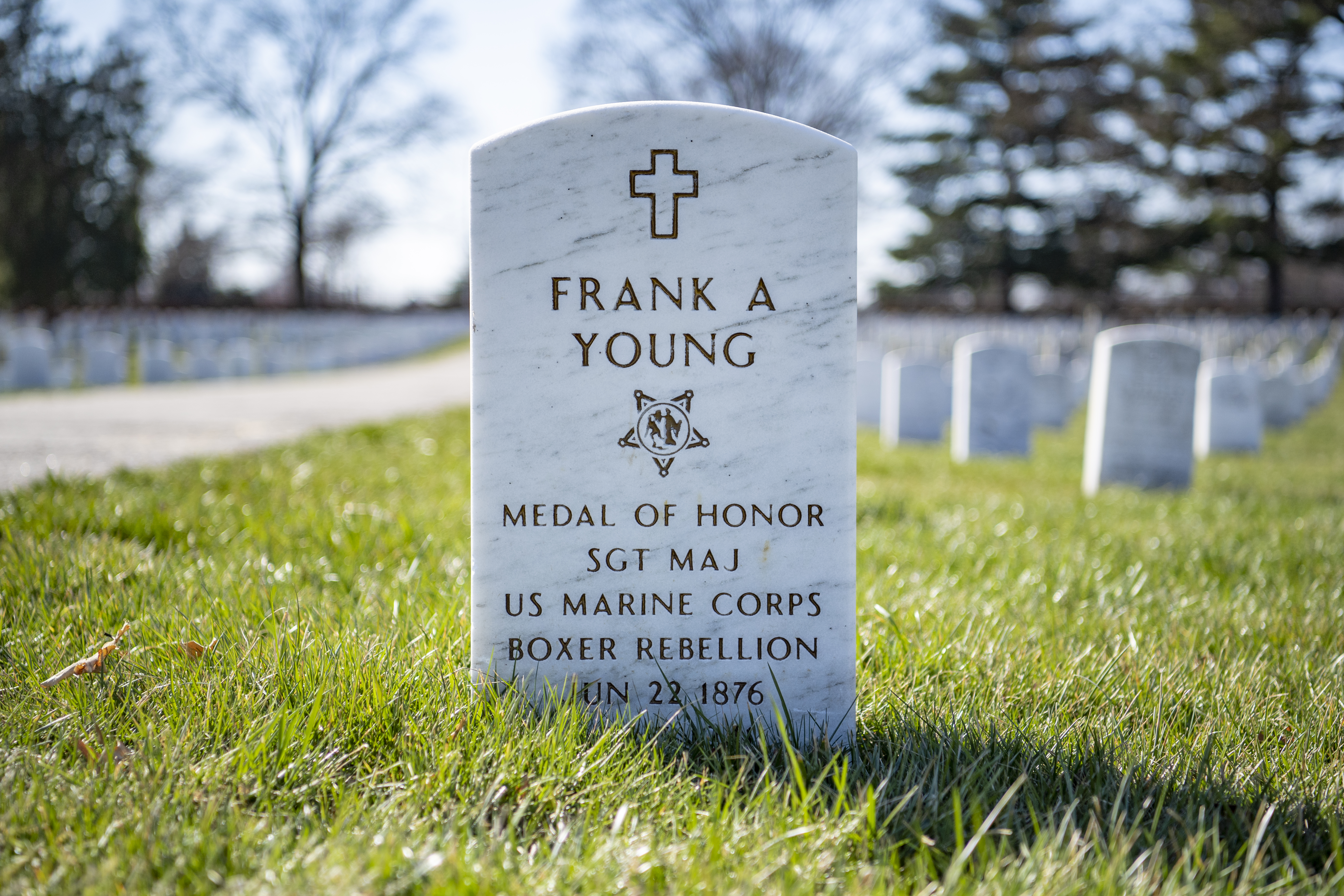
- Grave at Arlington National Cemetery
- Born: June 22, 1876; Milwaukee, Wisconsin, U.S.
- Died: April 3, 1941 (aged 64); Mare Island Shipyard, California, U.S.
- Burial place: Arlington National Cemetery in Arlington County, Virginia
- Military career
- Allegiance: United States
- Branch: United States Marine Corps
- Service years: 1897–1923
- Rank: Sergeant Major
- Conflicts: China Relief Expedition
- Awards: Medal of Honor

Frank Albert Young (June 22, 1876 – April 3, 1941) served in the United States Marine Corps. He received the Medal of Honor for his actions during the China Relief Expedition.

Young was born on June 22, 1876, in Milwaukee, Wisconsin. He died on April 3, 1941, and was buried at Arlington National Cemetery, in Arlington, Virginia.

== Medal of Honor citation ==
His award citation reads:

For extraordinary heroism in action in the presence of the enemy during the battle of Peking, China, 20 June to 16 July 1900. Throughout this period, Private Young distinguished himself by meritorious conduct.

== See also ==
- List of Medal of Honor recipients for the Boxer Rebellion
