= James Burnes (Medal of Honor) =

United States Marine Corps Medal of Honor recipient

- Born: January 14, 1870; Worcester, Massachusetts
- Military career
- Allegiance: United States
- Branch: United States Marine Corps
- Service years: 1898–1905
- Rank: Private
- Conflicts: Boxer Rebellion
- Awards: Medal of Honor

James Burnes (born January 14, 1870) was a private serving in the United States Marine Corps during the Boxer Rebellion who received the Medal of Honor for bravery.

== Biography ==
Burnes was born January 14, 1870, in Worcester, Massachusetts, and enlisted in the Marine Corps from Mare Island, California, on June 9, 1898. He was sent as a private to China to fight in the Boxer Rebellion.

He was serving in Tientsin, China, on June 20, 1900, and along with three other marines crossed a river in a small boat under heavy enemy fire to destroy several buildings that were occupied by hostile forces. For his actions that day he received he Medal of Honor on March 22, 1902. He was discharged from the Marine Corps on June 8, 1903, in Bremerton, Washington. He reenlisted on June 16, 1903. He received a bad conduct discharge on March 30, 1905.

== Medal of Honor citation ==
Rank and organization: Private, U.S. Marine Corps. Born: January 14, 1870, Worcester, Mass. Accredited to: California. G.O. No.: 84, March 22, 1902.

Citation:

In action against the enemy at Tientsin, China, 20 June 1900. Crossing the river in a small boat with 3 other men while under a heavy fire from the enemy, Burnes assisted in destroying buildings occupied by hostile forces.

== See also ==
- List of Medal of Honor recipients for the Boxer Rebellion
