= Clarence Edward Mathias =

United States Marine Corps Medal of Honor recipient

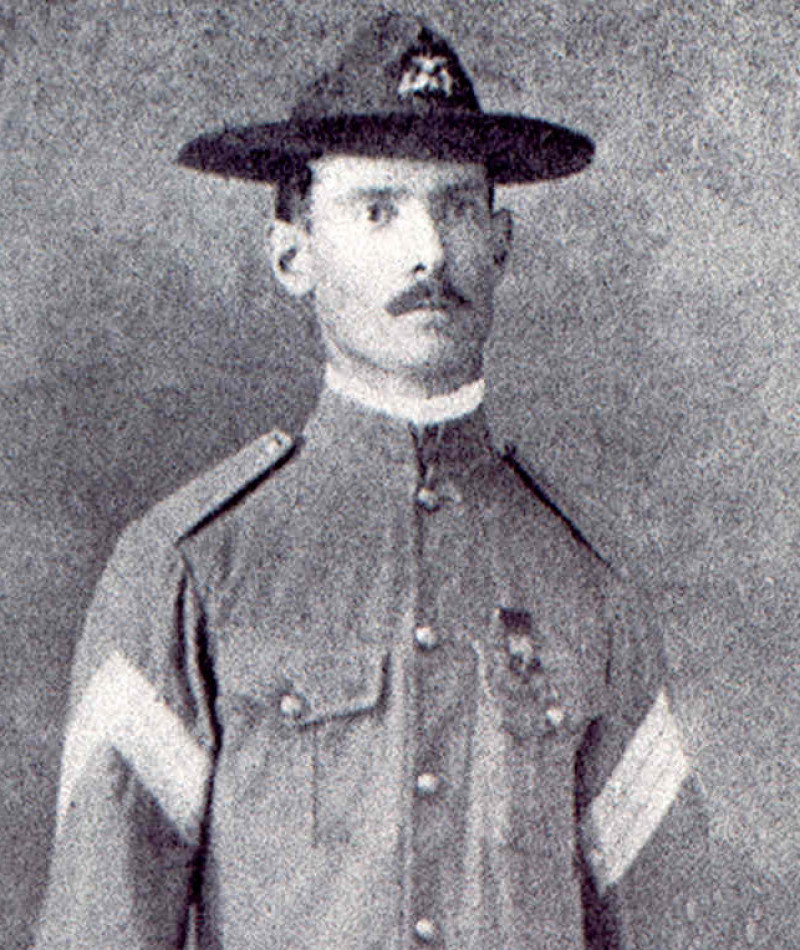
- Born: December 12, 1876; Royalton, Pennsylvania, US
- Died: December 9, 1935 (aged 58)
- Burial place: Arlington National Cemetery Arlington, Virginia
- Military career
- Allegiance: United States
- Branch: United States Marine Corps
- Service years: 1899–1923
- Rank: Sergeant Major
- Conflicts: Boxer Rebellion
- Awards: Medal of Honor

Clarence E. Mathias (December 12, 1876 – December 9, 1935) was an American Sergeant Major serving in the United States Marine Corps during the Boxer Rebellion who received the Medal of Honor for bravery.

== Biography ==
Mathias was born December 12, 1876, in Royalton, Pennsylvania, and after entering the Marine Corps he was sent as a private to China to fight in the Boxer Rebellion.

He died December 9, 1935, and is buried in Arlington National Cemetery, Arlington, Virginia. His grave can be found in section 6, lot 8681, map grid W/22.

== Medal of Honor citation ==
Rank and organization: Private, U.S. Marine Corps. Born: 12 December 1876, Royalton, Pa. Accredited to: Pennsylvania. G.O. No.: 55, 19 July 1901.

Citation:

In the presence of the enemy during the advance on Tientsin, China, 13 July 1900, Mathias distinguished himself by meritorious conduct.

== See also ==
- List of Medal of Honor recipients
- List of Medal of Honor recipients for the Boxer Rebellion
