= William H. Murray (Medal of Honor) =

United States Marine Corps Medal of Honor recipient

- Born: June 3, 1876; Brooklyn, New York
- Died: October 12, 1923 (aged 47); Rutland, Massachusetts, U.S.
- Burial place: Oak Grove Cemetery, Medford, Massachusetts
- Military career
- Allegiance: United States
- Branch: United States Marine Corps
- Service years: 1898–1903
- Rank: Private
- Conflicts: Boxer Rebellion
- Awards: Medal of Honor

William Henry Murray (June 3, 1876 – October 12, 1923) was an American private serving in the United States Marine Corps during the Boxer Rebellion who received the Medal of Honor for bravery.

== Biography ==
Murray was born June 3, 1876, in Brooklyn, New York and enlisted into the Marine Corps from Brooklyn on April 8, 1898, under the name Henry W. Davis. After entering the Marine Corps he was sent to fight in the Chinese Boxer Rebellion. He received the Medal for his actions in Peking, China from July 21 – August 17, 1900 and it was presented to him July 19, 1901. He died October 12, 1923, and is buried in Oak Grove Cemetery, Medford, Massachusetts. His grave can be found in the Mystic Lawn, O-61.

== Medal of Honor citation ==
Rank and organization: Private, U.S. Marine Corps. Born: 3 June 1876, Brooklyn, N.Y. Accredited to: New York. G.O. No.: 55, 19 July 1901.

Citation:

In the presence of the enemy during the action at Peking, China, 21 July to 17 August 1900. During this period, Murray distinguished himself by meritorious conduct. (Served as Henry W. Davis.)

== See also ==
- List of Medal of Honor recipients
- List of Medal of Honor recipients for the Boxer Rebellion
