= Albert Ralph Campbell =

United States Marine Corps Medal of Honor recipient

- Born: April 8, 1875; Williamsport, Pennsylvania
- Died: December 4, 1925 (aged 50)
- Burial place: Forest Lawn Memorial Park Glendale, California
- Military career
- Allegiance: United States
- Branch: United States Marine Corps
- Service years: 1897–1902
- Rank: Corporal
- Conflicts: Boxer Rebellion
- Awards: Medal of Honor

Albert Ralph Campbell (April 8, 1875 – December 4, 1925) was an American Private serving in the United States Marine Corps during the Boxer Rebellion who received the Medal of Honor for bravery.

== Biography ==
Campbell was born April 8, 1875, in Williamsport, Pennsylvania, and after entering the Marine Corps he was sent as a private to China to fight in the Boxer Rebellion.

He died December 4, 1925, and is buried in Forest Lawn Memorial Park Glendale, California.

== Medal of Honor citation ==
Rank and organization: Private, U.S. Marine Corps. Born: 8 April 1875, Williamsport, Pa. Accredited to: Pennsylvania. G.O. No.: 55, 19 July 1901.

Citation:

In action at Tientsin, China, 21 June 1900. During the advance on Tientsin, Campbell distinguished himself by his conduct.

== See also ==
- List of Medal of Honor recipients
- List of Medal of Honor recipients for the Boxer Rebellion
