= Thomas Wilbur Kates =

United States Marine Corps Medal of Honor recipient

- Born: May 7, 1861; Shelby Center, New York
- Died: May 6, 1931 (aged 69); Flushing, New York, U.S.
- Military career
- Allegiance: United States
- Branch: United States Marine Corps
- Service years: 1899–1903
- Rank: Sergeant
- Conflicts: Boxer Rebellion
- Awards: Medal of Honor

Thomas W. Kates (May 7, 1861 – May 6, 1931) was an American Private serving in the United States Marine Corps during the Boxer Rebellion who received the Medal of Honor for bravery.

== Biography ==
Kates was born May 7, 1861, in Shelby Center, New York and enlisted into the marine corps from the Marine Barracks in New York on July 21, 1899. After entering the Marine Corps he was sent to fight in the Chinese Boxer Rebellion.

He received his Medal for his actions in Tianjin, China June 21, 1900 and the medal was presented to him on July 19, 1901.

He was discharged from the marine corps May 19, 1903 in Brooklyn, New York.

== Medal of Honor citation ==
Rank and organization: Private, U.S. Marine Corps. Born: 7 May 1865, Shelby Center, N.Y. Accredited to: New York. G.O. No.: 55, 19 July 1901.

Citation:

In the presence of the enemy during the advance on Tientsin, China, 21 June 1900, Kates distinguished himself by meritorious conduct.

== See also ==
- List of Medal of Honor recipients
- List of Medal of Honor recipients for the Boxer Rebellion
