= Samuel McAllister =

United States Navy Medal of Honor recipient

- Born: January 23, 1869; Belfast, Ireland
- Died: December 13, 1903 (aged 34) at sea aboard the USS Wisconsin
- Burial place: buried at sea
- Military career
- Allegiance: United States of America
- Branch: United States Navy
- Rank: Ordinary Seaman
- Unit: USS Wisconsin (BB-9)
- Conflicts: Boxer Rebellion
- Awards: Medal of Honor

Samuel McAllister (January 23, 1869 – December 13, 1903) was an American sailor serving in the United States Navy who received the Medal of Honor for his actions during the Boxer Rebellion.

== Biography ==
McAllister was born January 23, 1869, in Belfast, Ireland, and after entering the Navy was sent as an Ordinary Seaman to China to fight in the Boxer Rebellion.

His Medal was presented to him by President Theodore Roosevelt and his Medal of Honor was accredited to the state California.

His body was lost at sea while serving aboard the USS Wisconsin (BB-9).

== Medal of Honor citation ==
Rank and organization: Ordinary Seaman, U.S. Navy. Born: 23 January 1869, Belfast, Ireland. Accredited to: California. G.O. No.: 84, 22 March 1902.

Citation:

In action against the enemy at Tientsin, China, 20 June 1900. Crossing the river in a small boat while under heavy enemy fire, McAllister assisted in destroying buildings occupied by the enemy.

== See also ==
- List of Medal of Honor recipients for the Boxer Rebellion
