= Robert H. Von Schlick =

United States Army Medal of Honor recipient

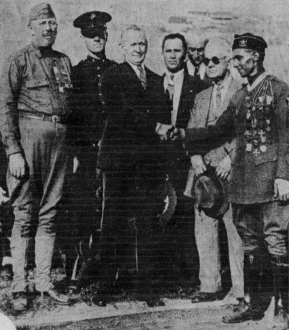
- Von Schlick (left) with California governor C. C. Young and five other Medal of Honor recipients in 1930
- Born: January 2, 1875; Berlin, Germany
- Died: July 1, 1941 (aged 66)
- Military career
- Allegiance: United States
- Branch: United States Army
- Service years: 1899–1900
- Rank: Private
- Unit: 9th U.S. Infantry
- Conflicts: Boxer Rebellion; Battle of Tientsin (WIA)
- Awards: Medal of Honor

Robert H. Von Schlick (January 2, 1875 – July 1, 1941) was a German-born United States Army private who received the Medal of Honor for actions during the Boxer Rebellion.

== Career ==
Von Schlick (name misspelled as Vonshlick on army records) joined the army from San Francisco in July 1899, and was discharged for disability in October 1900. During a battle on July 13, 1900, in Tianjin, China, Von Schlick rescued a wounded comrade despite his own wounds and then remained alone at a dike returning enemy fire.

== Death ==
Von Schlick died at the age of 66, roughly 41 years after earning the Medal of Honor.

== Medal of Honor ==
The President of the United States in the name of The Congress takes pleasure in presenting the Medal of Honor to

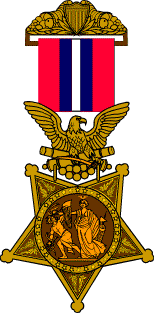

VON SCHLICK, ROBERT H.
Rank and Organization: Private, U.S. Army, Company C, 9th U.S. Infantry
Place and Date: Tianjin, China, July 13, 1900
Entered Service at: San Erancisco [sic], Calif.
Birth: Germany, January 2, 1875
Date of issue: September 3, 1903

Citation:

The President of the United States of America, in the name of Congress, takes pleasure in presenting the Medal of Honor to Private Robert H. Von Schlick, United States Army, for gallantry in action on 13 July 1900, while serving with Company C, 9th Infantry, at Tientsin, China. Although previously wounded while carrying a wounded comrade to a place of safety, Private Von Schlick rejoined his command, which partly occupied an exposed position upon a dike, remaining there after his command had been withdrawn, singly keeping up the fire, and obliviously presenting himself as a conspicuous target until he was literally shot off his position by the enemy.

== See also ==
- List of Medal of Honor recipients
