= James Cooney (Medal of Honor) =

United States Marine Corps Medal of Honor recipient

- Born: July 27, 1860; Limerick, Ireland
- Died: March 14, 1903 (aged 42); Vallejo, California, US
- Burial place: Mare Island Cemetery Vallejo, California
- Military career
- Allegiance: United States
- Branch: United States Marine Corps
- Service years: 1889–1903
- Rank: Private
- Conflicts: Boxer Rebellion
- Awards: Medal of Honor

James Cooney (July 27, 1860 – March 14, 1903) was an Irishman serving in the United States Marine Corps during the Boxer Rebellion who received the Medal of Honor for bravery.

== Biography ==
Cooney was born on July 27, 1860, in Limerick, Ireland, and enlisted in the Marine Corps on August 19, 1889. After joining the Marine Corps, he was deployed to fight in the Chinese Boxer Rebellion.

He received the Medal of Honor for his actions in Tianjin, China July 13, 1900. The medal was presented to him on January 24, 1902.

Cooney died on March 14, 1903, in Vallejo, California.

== Medal of Honor citation ==
Rank and organization: Private, U.S. Marine Corps. Born: 27 July 1860, Limerick, Ireland. Accredited to: Massachusetts. G.O. No.: 55, 19 July 1901.

Citation:

In the presence of the enemy during the battle near Tientsin, China, 13 July 1900, Cooney distinguished himself by meritorious conduct.

== See also ==
- List of Medal of Honor recipients
- List of Medal of Honor recipients for the Boxer Rebellion
