= Harry C. Adriance =

United States Marine Corps Medal of Honor recipient

Harry Chapman Adriance
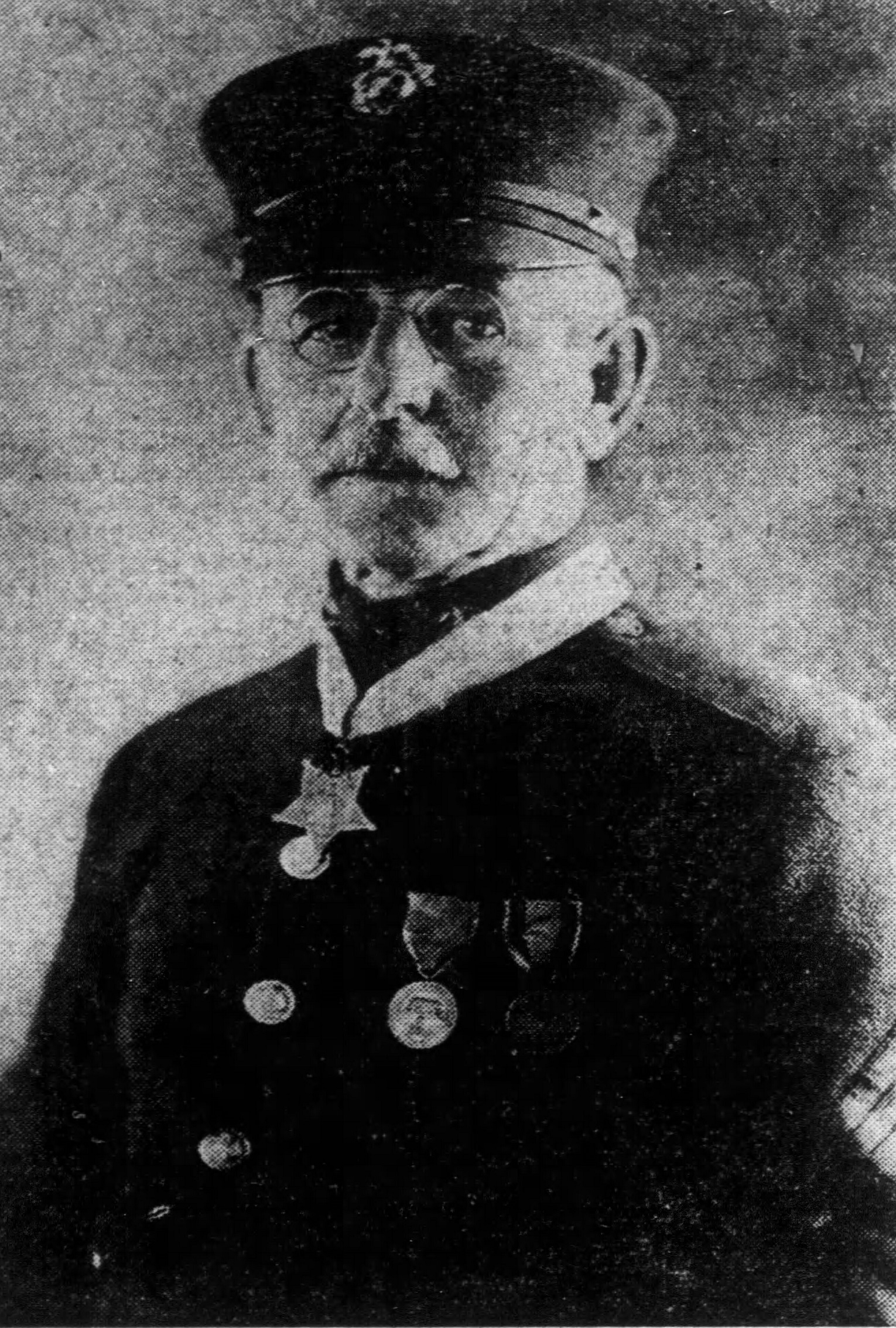
- Harry Chapman Adriance portrait, 19 Apr 1925 Buffalo, NY The Buffalo Sunday Times newspaper, page 31
- Born: October 27, 1864; Oswego, New York, US
- Died: January 25, 1934 (aged 69); Coney Island, New York, US
- Military career
- Allegiance: United States of America
- Branch: United States Marine Corps
- Service years: 1898–1904
- Rank: Private (demoted from Sergeant)
- Conflicts: Boxer Rebellion
- Awards: Medal of Honor; Spanish Campaign Medal; Philippine Campaign Medal; China Relief Expedition Medal

Harry Chapman Adriance (October 27, 1864 – January 25, 1934) was a United States marine who received the Medal of Honor for his "distinguished conduct in the presence of the enemy in battle near Tientsin, China" on July 13, 1900, during the Boxer Rebellion.

== Biography ==
Adriance was born on October 27, 1864, in Oswego, New York. At the age of 33, he enlisted in the United States Marine Corps in Boston, Massachusetts, on June 15, 1898. He served at Marine Barracks, New York Navy Yard, and then was transferred to the U.S. Naval Base, Cavite, Philippine Islands, arriving there on September 21, 1899.

He was among the marines sent to the city of Tientsin on June 29, 1900, at the outbreak of hostilities by the Boxers in China. Two weeks after arriving in China, Corporall Adriance distinguished himself by meritorious conduct during the battle near Tientsin. He served with the China Relief Expedition until October 10, 1900. On March 24, 1902, Adriance was presented the Medal of Honor for his actions on July 13, 1900.

Adriance returned to Cavite after his tour in China and then was transferred to the Brooklyn Navy Yard, New York, on July 20, 1902. He was discharged there at the rank of sergeant on June 19, 1903. Three weeks later, he re-enlisted in Buffalo, New York. A contested court-martial approximately one year later regarding theft charges resulted in him receiving a bad conduct discharge from the Marine Corps and a reduction in rank to private on September 7, 1904.

Adriance died in a hospital in Coney Island, New York, on January 25, 1934, at the age of 70 from gallstones and jaundice. Records indicate he was cremated, and his ashes given to his wife.

In the late 1980s, the Marine Corps League in his hometown of Oswego initiated proceedings in an attempt to upgrade Adriance's discharge. The outcome is unknown.

== Decorations ==
- Medal of Honor
- Spanish Campaign Medal
- Philippine Campaign Medal
- China Relief Expedition Medal (Navy)

== Medal of Honor citation ==
Rank and organization: Corporal, U.S. Marine Corps. Born: October 27, 1864, Oswego, N.Y. Accredited to: Massachusetts. G.O. No.: 55, July 19, 1901.

Citation:

In the presence of the enemy during the battle near Tientsin, China, July 13, 1900, Adriance distinguished himself by meritorious conduct.

== See also ==
- List of Medal of Honor recipients
- List of Medal of Honor recipients for the Boxer Rebellion
