= Jason Williams (footballer, born 1984) =

Bermudian footballer

Personal information
- Full name: Jason Williams
- Date of birth: July 19, 1984 (age 42)
- Place of birth: Bermuda
- Height: 5 ft 11 in (1.80 m)
- Position: Goalkeeper

Team information
- Current team: North Village Rams

Youth career
- –2001: Southampton Rangers

Senior career*
Years	Team	Apps	(Gls)
2001–	North Village Rams		
2007–2009	Bermuda Hogges	15	(0)

International career
2007–2008	Bermuda	3	(0)
- * Club domestic league appearances and goals as of 11 October 2009

Jason Williams (born July 19, 1984) is a Bermudian football player, who currently plays for North Village Rams.

== Career ==
=== Club ===
Williams began his professional club career with Southampton Rangers, before moving to the North Village Rams as of 2001, of which he is currently the starting goalkeeper in the Bermudian Premier Division.

Williams has been part of the Bermuda Hogges squad in the USL Second Division from 2007 through 2009.

In October 2011, Williams scored his first career goal for Village against Devonshire Cougars directly from a goalkick.

=== International ===
He made his senior international debut for Bermuda in a December 2007 friendly match against Saint Kitts and Nevis and earned a total of 4 caps. He has so far not represented his country in any FIFA World Cup qualification match.

His most recent international match was friendly match against Barbados in June 2008.
