= Axel Westermark =

United States Navy Medal of Honor recipient

- Born: April 8, 1875; Finland
- Died: May 7, 1911 (aged 36); California, US
- Burial place: San Francisco National Cemetery San Francisco, California
- Military career
- Allegiance: United States of America
- Branch: United States Navy
- Rank: Seaman
- Conflicts: Boxer Rebellion
- Awards: Medal of Honor

Axel Westermark (April 8, 1875 – May 7, 1911) was an American sailor serving in the United States Navy during the Boxer Rebellion who received the Medal of Honor for bravery.

== Biography ==
Westermark was born April 8, 1875, in Finland. After entering the navy he was sent as an Seaman to China to fight in the Boxer Rebellion.

He died May 7, 1911, in California. He was initially buried in the former Puget Sound Navy Yard Cemetery; his remains now lie in San Francisco National Cemetery.

== Medal of Honor citation ==
Rank and organization: Seaman, U.S. Navy. Born: 8 April 1875, Finland. Accredited to: California. G.O. No.: 55, 19 July 1901.

Citation:

In the presence of the enemy during the battle of Peking, China, 28 June to 17 August 1900. Throughout this period, Westermark distinguished himself by meritorious conduct.

== See also ==
- List of Medal of Honor recipients
- List of Medal of Honor recipients for the Boxer Rebellion
