= Jay Williams (Medal of Honor) =

United States Navy Medal of Honor recipient

Jay P. Williams
- Born: September 23, 1872; Orland, Indiana, U.S.
- Died: July 4, 1938 (aged 65); Norwalk, Ohio, U.S.
- Burial place: Woodlawn Cemetery Norwalk, Ohio
- Military career
- Allegiance: United States
- Branch: United States Navy
- Rank: Coxswain
- Conflicts: Boxer Rebellion
- Awards: Medal of Honor

Jay P. Williams (September 23, 1872 – July 4, 1938) was an American sailor serving in the United States Navy during the Boxer Rebellion. He received the Medal of Honor for bravery.

== Biography ==
Williams was born September 23, 1872, in Orland, Indiana, and after entering the navy he was sent as an Coxswain to China to fight in the Boxer Rebellion.

He died July 4, 1938, and is buried in Woodlawn Cemetery Norwalk, Ohio. His grave can be found in section 9, Ave A to Ave B, row 2, grave 41.

== Medal of Honor citation ==
Rank and organization: Coxswain, U.S. Navy. Born: 23 September 1872, Orland, Ind. Accredited to: Ohio. G.O. No.: 55, 19 July 1901.

Citation:

In action with the relief expedition of the Allied forces in China, 13, 20, 21 and 22 June 1900. During this period and in the presence of the enemy, Williams distinguished himself by meritorious conduct.

== See also ==
- List of Medal of Honor recipients
- List of Medal of Honor recipients for the Boxer Rebellion
