= Louis Rene Gaiennie =

United States Marine Corps Medal of Honor recipient

- Born: June 9, 1878; St. Louis, Missouri
- Died: November 25, 1942 (aged 64)
- Burial place: Calvary Cemetery; St. Louis, Missouri
- Military career
- Allegiance: United States
- Branch: United States Marine Corps
- Service years: 1899–1901
- Rank: Private
- Conflicts: Boxer Rebellion
- Awards: Medal of Honor

Louis Rene Gaiennie (June 9, 1878 – November 25, 1942) was a United States Marine who earned the Medal of Honor for his actions as part of the China Relief Expedition from July 21 to August 17, 1900, in Peking, China, during the Boxer Rebellion.

Gaiennie was born in St. Louis, Missouri.

== Medal of Honor citation ==
His official Medal of Honor citation reads:

In the presence of the enemy during the action at Peking, China, 21 July to 17 August 1900, Gaiennie distinguished himself by meritorious conduct.

== See also ==
- List of Medal of Honor recipients
