= Martin Hunt (Medal of Honor) =

United States Marine Corps Medal of Honor recipient

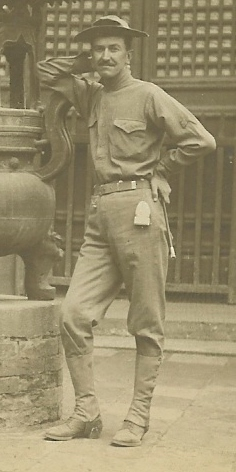
- Hunt in 1898
- Born: July 9, 1873; County Mayo, Ireland
- Died: July 22, 1938 (aged 65); Philippines
- Military career
- Allegiance: United States
- Branch: United States Marine Corps
- Service years: 1896–1901
- Rank: Corporal
- Conflicts: Boxer Rebellion
- Awards: Medal of Honor

Martin Hunt (July 9, 1873 – July 22, 1938) was an American Private serving in the United States Marine Corps during the Boxer Rebellion who received the Medal of Honor for bravery.

== Biography ==
Hunt was born July 9, 1873, in the County of Mayo, Ireland and enlisted into the Marine Corps from Boston, Massachusetts on August 27, 1896. After entering the Marine Corps he was sent to fight in the Chinese Boxer Rebellion.

He received his Medal for his actions in Peking, China from June 20 – July 16, 1900. The Medal was presented to him on July 19, 1901.

He was discharged from the Marine Corps on August 26, 1901, and lived in the Philippines until his death on July 22, 1938.

== Medal of Honor citation ==
Rank and organization: Private, U.S. Marine Corps. Born: 9 July 1873, County of Mayo, Ireland. Accredited to: Massachusetts. G.O. No.: 55, 19 July 1901.

Citation:

In the presence of the enemy during the battle of Peking, China, from 20 June to 16 July 1900, Hunt distinguished himself by meritorious conduct.

== See also ==
- List of Medal of Honor recipients
- List of Medal of Honor recipients for the Boxer Rebellion
