= USS Newark (C-1) =

Protected cruiser

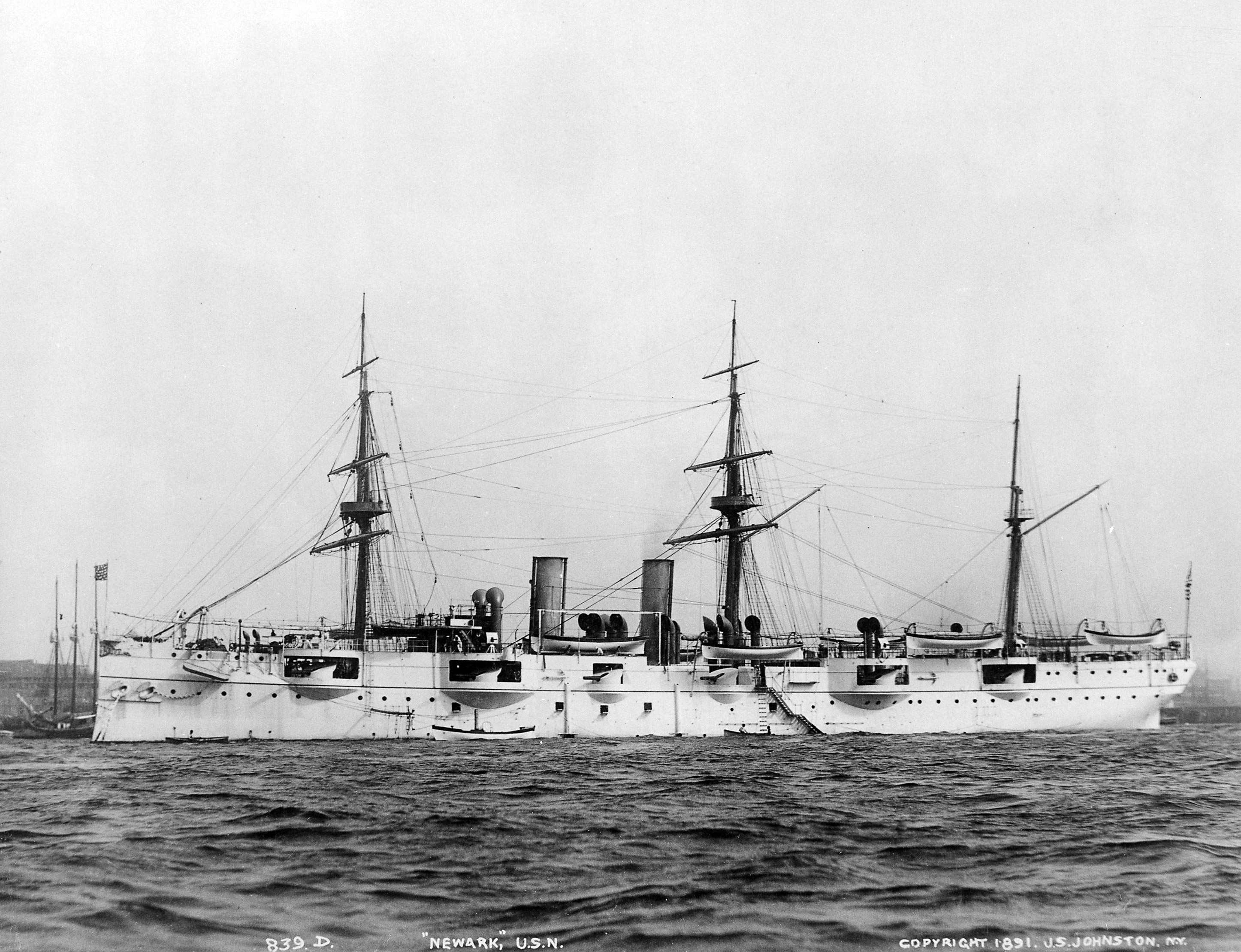
- USS Newark port side, 1891.

History

United States
- Name: Newark
- Namesake: City of Newark, New Jersey
- Builder: William Cramp & Sons, Philadelphia
- Yard number: 258
- Laid down: 12 June 1888
- Launched: 19 March 1890
- Sponsored by: Miss Annie Boutelle
- Commissioned: 2 February 1891
- Decommissioned: 16 June 1913
- Stricken: 26 June 1913
- Identification: Hull symbol:C-1
- Fate: 7 September 1926, sold for scrap

General characteristics
- Type: Protected cruiser
- Displacement: 4,083 long tons (4,149 t)
- Length: 311 ft 6 in (94.95 m) lwl; 328 ft (100 m) oa
- Beam: 49 ft 2 in (14.99 m)
- Draft: 18 ft 8 in (5.69 m) (mean); 22 ft 8 in (6.91 m) (max)
- Installed power: 4 × boilers; 2 × horizontal triple expansion engines; 8,500 ihp (6,300 kW)
- Propulsion: 2 × shafts
- Speed: 18 knots (33 km/h; 21 mph)
- Range: 3,922 nmi (7,264 km; 4,513 mi) at 10 kn (19 km/h; 12 mph)
- Complement: 34 officers, 350 enlisted men
- Armament: 12 × 6-inch (152 mm)/30 caliber Mark 3 guns; 4 × 6-pounder (57 mm (2.2 in)) guns; 4 × 3-pounder (47 mm (1.9 in)) guns; 2 × 1-pounder (37 mm (1.5 in)) guns; 4 × .45 caliber (11.4 mm) Gatling guns
- Armor: Gun shields: 2 in (51 mm); Main deck: 3 in (76 mm); Conning Tower: 3 in (76 mm)

The first USS Newark (C-1) was a United States Navy protected cruiser, the eighth protected cruiser launched by the United States. In design, she succeeded the "ABC" cruisers Atlanta, Boston, and Chicago with better protection, higher speed, and a uniform 6-inch gun armament. Four additional protected cruisers (C-2 through C-5) were launched for the USN prior to Newark.

She was laid down by William Cramp & Sons of Philadelphia on 12 June 1888, launched on 19 March 1890, sponsored by Miss Annie Boutelle, the daughter of Representative Charles A. Boutelle of Maine, and commissioned on 2 February 1891, Captain Silas Casey III in command.

== Design and construction ==
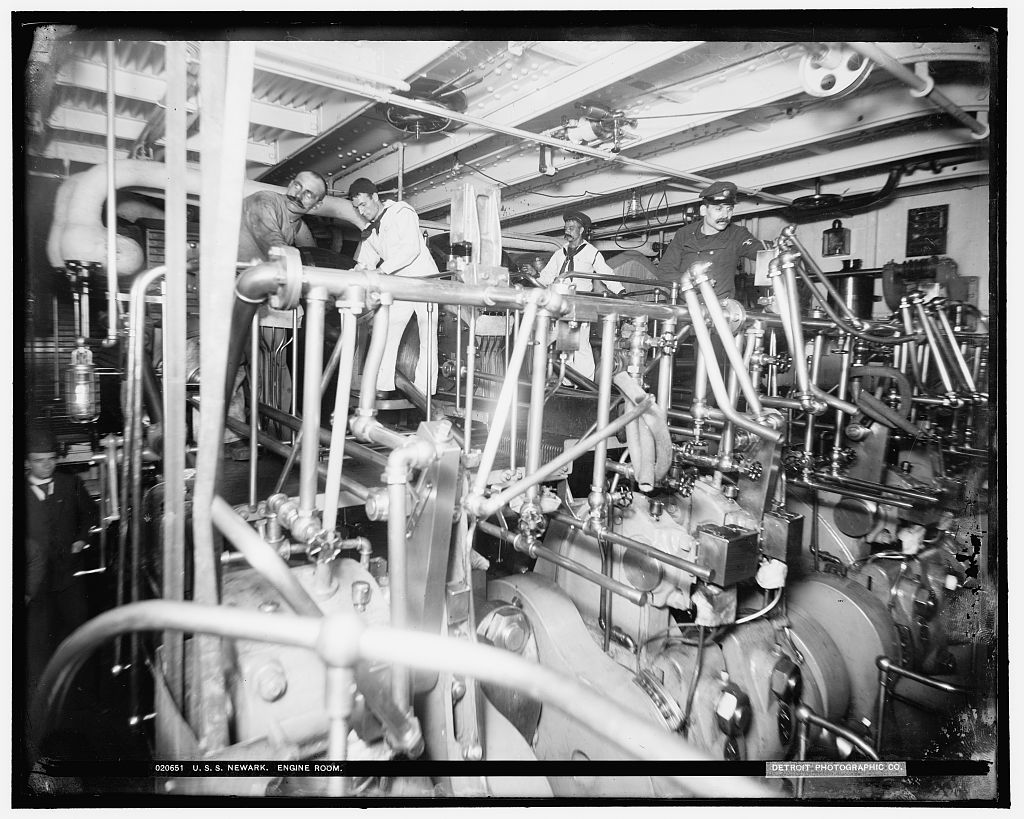
USS Newark, engine room

Newark was designed in 1885 by the Navy's Bureau of Construction and Repair and Bureau of Steam Engineering, based on specifications developed by a special advisory board convened by Secretary of the Navy William C. Whitney. The new board was convened when Whitney felt the Naval Advisory Board's design was inadequate. Newark's uniform main armament of twelve 6-inch guns resulted from the need to mount guns in sponsons to increase their arc of fire. Rear Admiral Edward Simpson, president of the Naval Advisory Board, commented that it was impossible to mount 8-inch guns on sponsons in a 4,000-ton ship. She also had a complete armored deck in accordance with European practice.

Newark was armed with 12 6-inch (152 mm)/30 caliber Mark 3 guns in sponsons along the sides. This allowed ahead and astern fire by up to four guns. Secondary armament was four 6-pounder (57 mm (2.2 in)) guns, four 3-pounder (47 mm (1.85 in)) Hotchkiss revolving cannon, two 1-pounder (37 mm (1.5 in)) Hotchkiss revolving cannon, and four .45 caliber (11.4 mm) Gatling guns. Six 14-inch (356 mm) torpedo tubes were included in the design but never mounted.

Newark had 2 in (51 mm) gun shields and a 3 in (76 mm) conning tower. The complete armored deck was up to 3 in (76 mm) on its sloped sides and aft, 2 in (51 mm) amidships and forward. This was a significant improvement from the 1.5 in (38 mm) partial deck of Chicago.

The engineering plant included four coal-fired locomotive boilers producing 160 psi (1,100 kPa) steam, with two horizontal triple expansion engines totaling 8,500 ihp (6,300 kW) driving two shafts for a speed of 18 knots (33 km/h; 21 mph). Like other US Navy ships of the 1880s, she was built with a sail rig to increase cruising range, later removed. The ship carried up to 400 tons of coal, with a cruising range as built of 3,922 nmi (7,264 km; 4,513 mi) at 10 kn (19 km/h; 12 mph); this could be increased to 850 tons for a range of 8,333 nmi (15,433 km; 9,589 mi).

=== Refits ===
In 1898 Newark's 6-inch guns were converted to rapid firing. She was rebuilt in 1901–02 with 6-inch (152 mm)/40 caliber Mark 3 guns, with the secondary armament augmented or replaced by six 3-inch (76 mm)/50 caliber guns. The 3-inch guns were removed in 1908, and all armament was removed prior to her service as a hospital ship beginning in 1913.

== Service history ==
=== North & South Atlantic, 1891–1897 ===
Newark operated off the Atlantic coast for ten months, taking part in maneuvers and exercises until detached on 8 December at Norfolk Navy Yard. There she remained, undergoing post-shakedown overhaul until being assigned on 11 March 1892 to the North Atlantic Squadron and sailing on 14 March for the West Indies. The cruiser operated in Caribbean waters and off the lower east coast, showing the flag in West Indies ports until returning to Norfolk on 5 June where she was made flagship of Rear Admiral Andrew E. K. Benham, Commander of the newly formed South Atlantic Squadron, on 25 June.

She departed on 17 July for Cádiz, Spain to participate in the ceremonies commemorating the 400th Anniversary of Columbus' sailing. Arriving on 30 July, she remained until 2 August then sailed for Genoa, Columbus' birthplace, arriving one month later to continue the celebration. Putting out from Genoa on 25 August, Newark cruised the Mediterranean and the Adriatic, visiting many ports until arriving on 11 February 1893 at Cádiz to take in tow a full size reproduction of caravel Niña and sailing on 18 February for home. Transferred to the Naval Review Fleet for temporary duty on 1 March, the cruiser arrived at Havana on 21 March, parting with Niña there, thence sailing to Hampton Roads and New York where she picked up the caravel once more and proceeded down the St. Lawrence River to Quebec, leaving the little ship there on 11 June and returning to Norfolk on 22 June.

Newark next sailed on 20 September, this time for Rio de Janeiro, Brazil, to protect American interests, arriving on 20 October and remaining until 1 April 1894. The warship then operated off the South American coast with the South Atlantic Squadron, making one cruise to South Africa from August to October 1894 and another the same time the following year, before returning to Norfolk on 27 April 1896. Assigned to the North Atlantic Station on 4 May, she joined her squadron at New York 25 June and engaged in patrol duty and exercises off the southeastern coast until decommissioning at Norfolk 6 March 1897.

=== Spanish–American War, 1898 ===
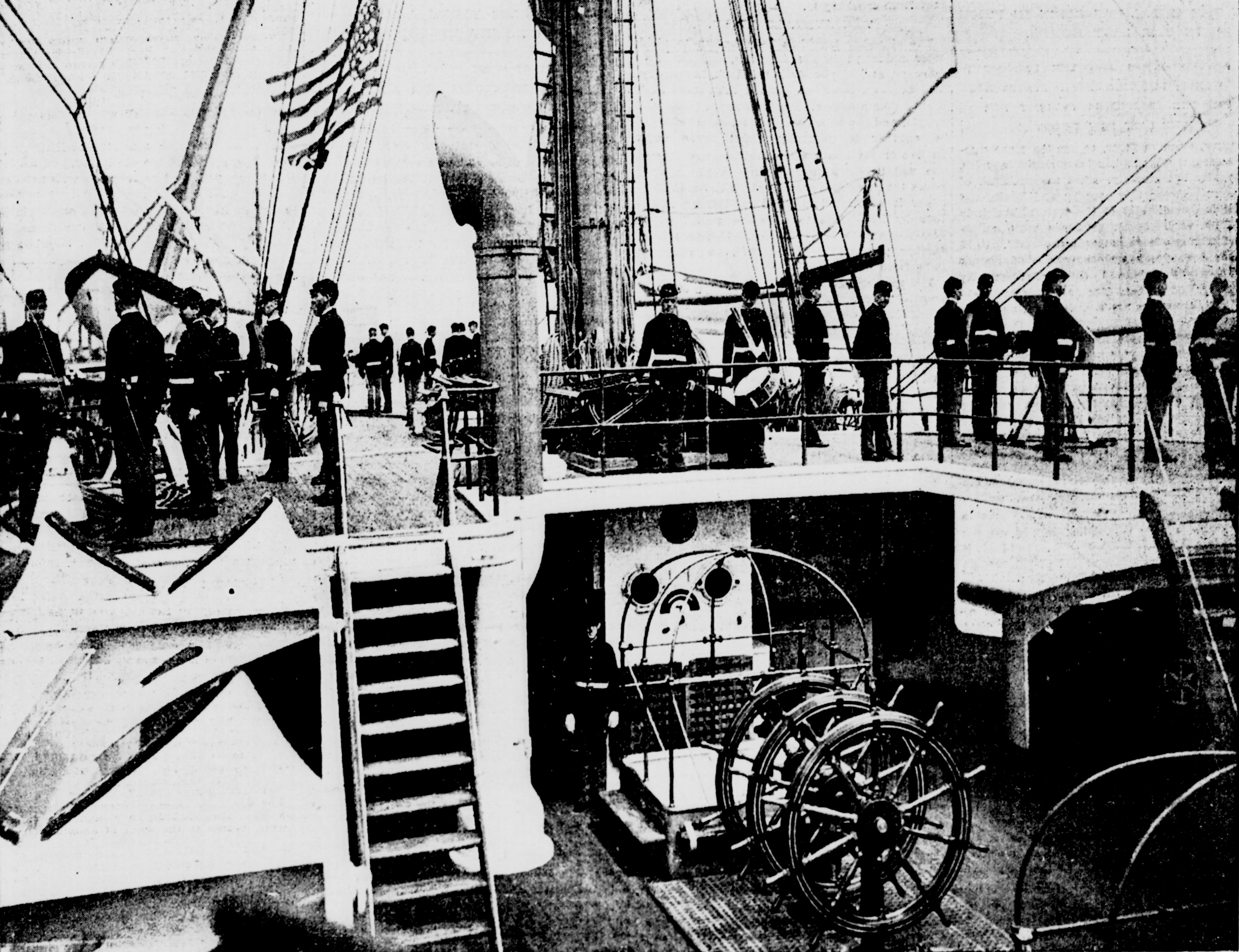
Marines manning the secondary battery, circa 1898.

Following extensive overhaul, Newark recommissioned on 23 May 1898, shortly after the declaration of war on Spain, she sailed on 13 June for Key West and then Cuba, joining the blockade on 30 June. Cruising in Cuban waters throughout the summer, the warship bombarded the port of Manzanillo on 12 August and on the following day accepted its surrender. After the battle of Santiago de Cuba, she participated in the final destruction of Admiral Cervera's fleet through bombardment of the burned hulks. Newark returned to New York on 26 November 1898.

=== Philippine–American War, 1899 ===
Departing New York on 23 March 1899, the cruiser steamed down the coast of South America on patrol, stopping at numerous ports along the way. In the middle of her cruise, on 7 April, she was ordered to proceed through the Straits of Magellan to San Francisco. The ship, low on coal, was forced to put into Port Low, Chile, from 31 May to 22 June to cut wood for fuel. Finally arriving Mare Island Navy Yard on 4 September, Newark underwent repairs and then sailed on 17 October via Honolulu for the Philippines arriving Cavite on 25 November to support the U.S. Army in the Philippine–American War. The warship took station off Vigan, Luzon, landed troops for garrison duty, then moved on to Aparri on 10 December, receiving the surrender of insurrectionists in the provinces of Cagayan, Isabela, and Bataan.

=== Boxer Rebellion, 1900–1901 ===
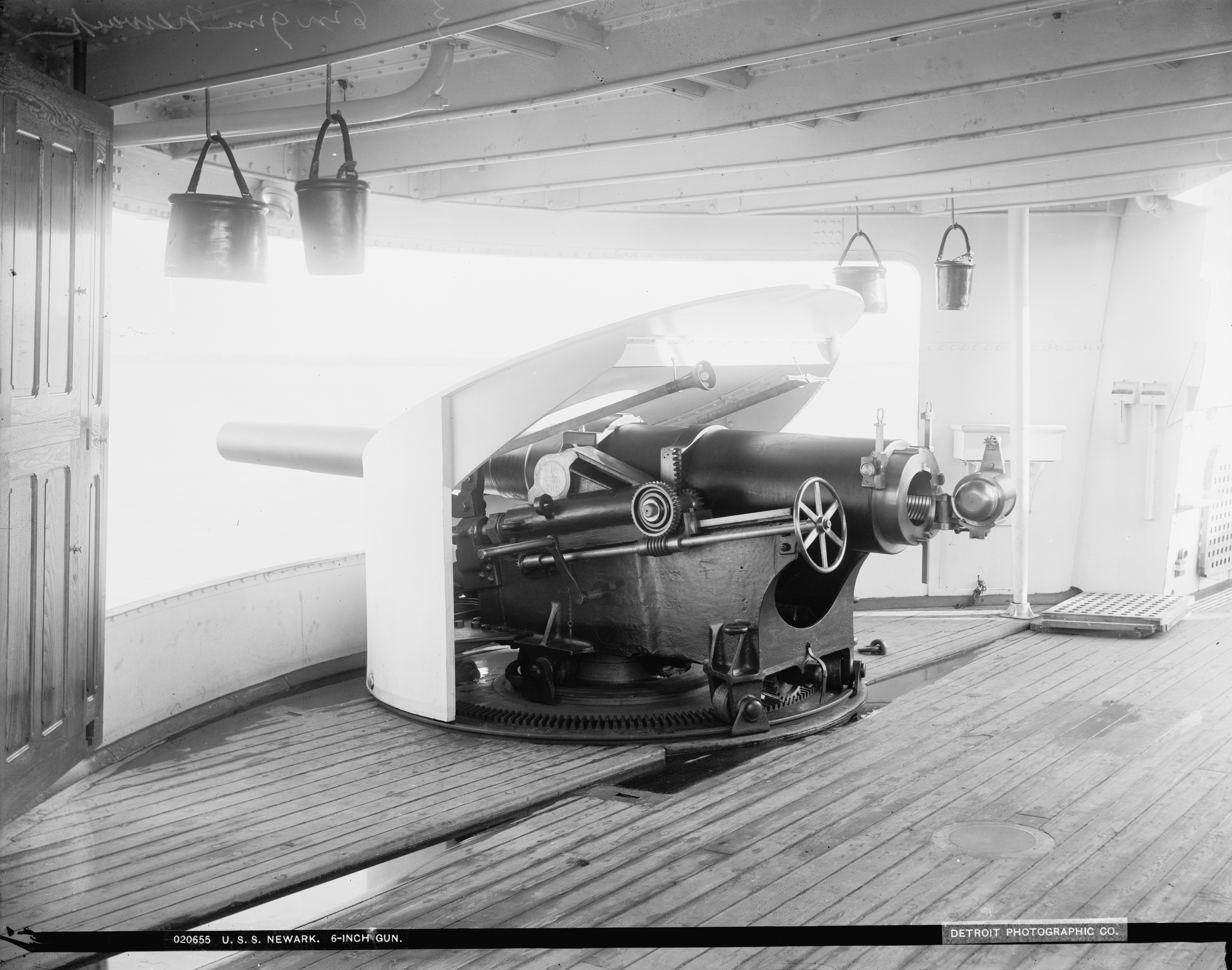
6-inch gun on USS Newark

On 19 March 1900, she sailed for Hong Kong to rendezvous with the monitor USS Monadnock on 22 March and convoy that ship to Cavite, arriving on 3 April and staying there until sailing for Yokohama on 24 April, arriving three days later. The ship then hoisted the flag of Rear Admiral Louis Kempff, Assistant-Commander of the Asiatic Station and sailed on 20 May for China to help land reinforcements to relieve the legations under siege by the Boxers at Peking. Arriving Tientsin on 22 May, Newark operated in that port and out of Taku and Chefoo, protecting American interests and aiding the relief expedition under Vice Admiral Edward Hobart Seymour, R.N., until sailing at the end of July for Kure, Japan, and then Cavite where she hoisted the pennant of the Senior Squadron Commander in the Philippines. She sailed for home in mid-April 1901, via Hong Kong, Ceylon and Suez, arriving Boston late July 1901. She decommissioned there on 29 July.

=== North Atlantic Fleet, 1902–1906 ===
Newark recommissioned on 3 November 1902, Commander Richard Wainwright in command and sailed on 14 December for duty in southern waters. For the next two years she operated in the West Indies and off the coast of South America as part of the North Atlantic Fleet. Returning to Norfolk briefly on 27 October 1904 to 9 January 1905, she resumed her duties in the West Indies for the first six months of the year and then in June, following exercises off Virginia, was assigned as a training ship to the United States Naval Academy. Placed in reserve at Annapolis on 15 September, she was restored to full duty on 3 May 1906 for her second east coast training cruise. On 4 August 1906 one of her launches was sunk in a collision with the tug T. A. Scott, Jr. at New London, Connecticut. Following this duty, she put into Norfolk on 13 September where she embarked a Marine detachment and sailed for Cuba on the 17th. The veteran cruiser returned home on 19 October and decommissioned at New York Navy Yard on 9 November.

=== Cuba, 1908–1912 ===
Loaned to the New York Naval Militia on 23 March 1907, she recommissioned exactly one year later for duty as a station ship at the Naval Station, Guantánamo Bay, Cuba. Arriving on 2 April 1908, she served on this duty until returning to Norfolk on 5 December 1912 to be placed in reserve on the 31st. Newark decommissioned on 16 June 1913 and was stricken from the Navy List on 26 June.

=== Hospital ship, 1913–1926 ===
The old cruiser continued to serve her country following her Navy service. Turned over to the Public Health Service, she served as quarantine hulk for the hospital in Providence, Rhode Island, until 1918 when she returned to the Navy to serve throughout World War I as an annex to the Naval Hospital, Newport, Rhode Island. Later transferred to New York, she returned to the Public Health Service at Providence, in May 1919. On 7 July 1926 she was again returned to the Navy Department for disposal and was sold on 7 September.

== Bibliography ==
- Bauer, K. Jack; Roberts, Stephen S. (1991). Register of Ships of the U.S. Navy, 1775–1990: Major Combatants. Westport, Connecticut: Greenwood Press. ISBN 0-313-26202-0.
- Burr, Lawrence. US Cruisers 1883–1904: The Birth of the Steel Navy. Oxford: Osprey, 2008. ISBN 1-84603-267-9 OCLC 488657946
- Friedman, Norman (1984). U.S. Cruisers: An Illustrated Design History. Annapolis, Maryland: United States Naval Institute. ISBN 0-87021-718-6.
- Gardiner, Robert; Chesneau, Roger (1979). Conway's All the World's Fighting Ships 1860–1905. New York: Mayflower Books. ISBN 0-8317-0302-4.
