= Newte =

Newte is a surname. Notable people with the surname include:

- Henry Newte (1609–1670), English politician
- Horace Newte (1870–1949), English playwright, author, and journalist
- John Newte (1656–1716), Anglican cleric
- Richard Newte (1613–1678), Anglican cleric

== See also ==
- Newt (name)
