= Newt (name) =

Newt is a shortened form of the given name Newton. It may refer to:

== People ==
- Newt Allen (1901–1988), American Negro league baseball player
- Newt Gingrich (born 1943), American politician and former Speaker of the House
- Newt H. Hall (1873–1939), American Marine Corps officer who served during the Boxer Rebellion
- Newt Heisley (1920–2009), American commercial artist who designed the POW/MIA flag
- Newt Hudson (1926-2014), American politician and educator
- Newt Hunter (1880–1963), American Major League Baseball player
- Newt Joseph (1896-1953), American Negro league baseball player and manager
- Newt Kimball (1915-2001), American Major League Baseball pitcher
- Newt Loken (1919-2011), American gymnast and coach
- Newt V. Mills (1899–1996), American politician
- Newt Perry (1908-1987), American swimmer, coach and promoter of water theme parks
- Newt Randall (1880–1955), American Major League Baseball player

== Fictional characters ==
- Newt Dobbs, in the Western novel Lonesome Dove, the miniseries adaptation, and the sequel miniseries, Return to Lonesome Dove
- Rebecca "Newt" Jorden, in the film Aliens
- Newt Livingston from Cory in the House
- Oswald "Uncle Newt" Nightingale, one of the central characters in the ninth series of John Finnemore's Souvenir Programme
- Newt Scamander, the fictional author of J. K. Rowling's 2001 book Fantastic Beasts and Where to Find Them
- Newt, a character in Hollyoaks
- Newt, in the novel The Maze Runner, the two sequels and the film trilogy based on them
- Newt, a character from Xenoblade Chronicles 2
- Newt, a character from Pirate Express

== See also ==
- Newt (disambiguation)
