= USS Daly =

Fletcher-class destroyer

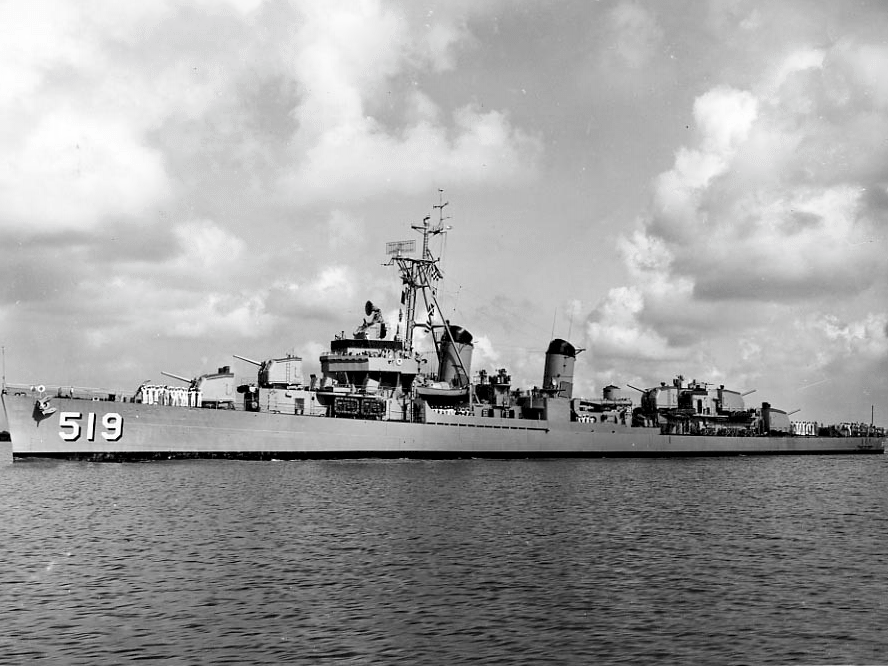
- USS Daly (DD-519) steaming down the Cooper River in July 1952

History

United States
- Namesake: Daniel Daly
- Builder: Bethlehem Mariners Harbor, Staten Island
- Laid down: 29 April 1942
- Launched: 24 October 1942
- Commissioned: 10 March 1943
- Decommissioned: 18 April 1946
- Recommissioned: 6 July 1951
- Decommissioned: 2 May 1960
- Stricken: 1 December 1974
- Fate: Sold for scrap, 22 April 1976

General characteristics
- Class & type: Fletcher-class destroyer
- Displacement: 2,050 tons
- Length: 376 ft 6 in (114.7 m)
- Beam: 39 ft 8 in (12.1 m)
- Draft: 17 ft 9 in (5.4 m)
- Propulsion: 60,000 shp (45 MW); 2 propellers
- Speed: 35 knots (65 km/h; 40 mph)
- Range: 6500 nmi. (12,000 km) at 15 kt
- Complement: 336
- Armament: 5 × single Mk 12 5 in (127 mm)/38 guns; 5 × twin 40 mm (1.6 in) Bofors AA guns; 7 × single 20 mm (0.8 in) Oerlikon AA guns; 2 × quintuple 21 in (533 mm) torpedo tubes; 6 × single depth charge throwers; 2 × depth charge racks

USS Daly (DD-519), a Fletcher-class destroyer, was a ship of the United States Navy named for Marine Sergeant Major Daniel Daly, (1873–1937), one of the very few people to be twice awarded the Medal of Honor.

== Construction and commissioning ==
Daly was launched 24 October 1942 by Bethlehem Steel Co., Staten Island, N.Y., sponsored by Mrs. A. Ransweiler, niece of Sergeant Major Daly; and commissioned 10 March 1943.

== 1943 ==
Between 14 May and 21 June 1943 Daly screened Ranger (CV-4) on exercises and patrol off NS Argentia, Newfoundland. She sailed from New York a week later screening Lexington (CV-16) and arrived at San Diego 4 August. The next day she was underway for Alaska, arriving at Adak 11 August. She escorted transports to the invasion of Kiska from 15 to 21 August, then patrolled and had escort duty between Kiska and Attu until 18 November when she sailed for Pearl Harbor, arriving 23 November.

Daly left Pearl Harbor 9 December 1943 and arrived at Milne Bay, New Guinea, 18 December. Four days later she sortied to escort landing craft during the assault on Cape Gloucester, New Britain on 26 December. She splashed two attacking Japanese bombers, then aided survivors from Brownson (DD-518), rescuing 168 of her crew despite exploding depth charges from the sinking ship which caused temporary loss of power on Daly.

== 1944 ==
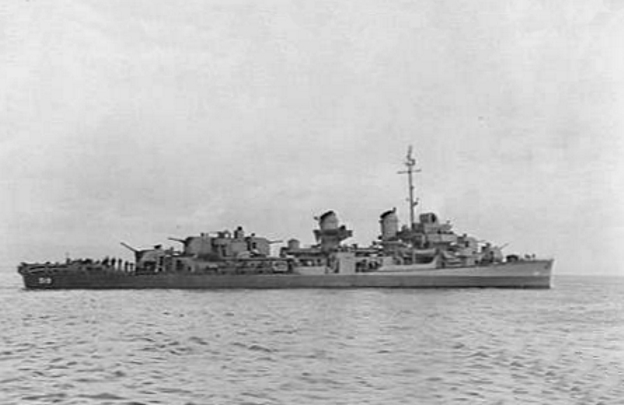
Daly painted in Camouflage Measure 22.

Daly covered the withdrawal of the LSTs to Cape Sudest, then escorted a convoy to Saidor for the invasion landings of 2 to 4 January 1944. She remained in the New Guinea area covering resupply operations for the troops on Saidor and Cape Gloucester until 4 February when she sailed for Sydney, Australia.

Returning to Milne Bay, 22 February 1944, Daly sailed with Task Group 74.2 (TG 74.2) for the invasion of the Admiralty Islands, participating in the bombardments of Los Negros Island on 29 February and Seeadler Harbor, Manus Island on 7 March, and patrolling in support of the landing forces. She returned to Milne Bay 12 March. She operated from this port on various training exercises and bombarded Wewak Harbor on 17 March, then sortied 18 April for the Hollandia operation. She provided fire support for the invading troops on 21 and 22 April, then operated out of Seeadler Harbor to bombard the Wakde and Sawar Airfields on the night of 29–30 April to neutralize the danger of air attack on newly won Allied positions on New Guinea, and to patrol between Aitape and Tanahmerah Bay.

From 15 May to 5 August 1944 Daly served in the Western New Guinea operations. She provided fire support and bombardment in the Toem-Wakde-Sarmi area, off Biak, Noemfoor, and Mios Woendi Islands, and acted as radar guard and linking ship between the landing and covering forces off Cape Sansapor. After a brief overhaul at Sydney, Australia, she sortied from Humboldt Bay 11 September for the invasion of Morotai, providing patrol and fire support before returning to Manus 29 September. She got underway on 11 October to render fire support to the troops invading Leyte and joined in the surface action with Japanese ships during the Battle of Surigao Strait phase of the decisive Battle for Leyte Gulf on 25 and 26 October. Daly returned to Manus 3 November and six days later sailed for a West Coast overhaul.

== 1945 ==
Daly arrived off Iwo Jima 16 February 1945 in the screen of air support carriers. She rescued 11 survivors of Bismarck Sea (CVE-95), sunk by a suicide plane on 21 February. Daly cleared the area 7 March for San Pedro Bay, Leyte, to join forces preparing for the invasion of Okinawa. On 27 March she sortied to provide patrol and fire support during the assault and occupation of Okinawa. During a suicide attack on 28 April she took an enemy plane under fire and splashed it a scant 25 yards off the port beam. The plane's bomb exploded, killing three including the ship's Doctor and injuring 16 of Daly's crew. Repairs were quickly accomplished at Kerama Retto and Daly resumed her hazardous patrol duty. On 25 May she aided Bates (APD-47), a kamikaze's victim, rescuing one badly burned survivor from the sinking ship. On 10 June she screened the carriers of the 3rd Fleet in their strikes on the Japanese mainland.

After replenishing at Leyte Gulf, Daly returned to Okinawa 16 July 1945. She joined with Task Force 95 (TF 95) to sweep the East China Sea for enemy shipping. Two more searches off the mouth of the Yangtze River and approaches to Shanghai were made before the end of the war. Daly arrived at Nagasaki 14 September for occupation duty, serving in Japanese waters until 17 November when she departed Sasebo for the United States, arriving at San Diego 6 December. She arrived at Charleston, S.C., 23 December, and was placed out of commission in reserve 18 April 1946.

== 1951 – 1960 ==
Recommissioned 6 July 1951 Daly joined the Atlantic Fleet, and operated out of her home port, Newport, R.I., for antisubmarine and convoy escort exercises and on patrol. Between 18 March 1953 and 15 January 1954 she made a round-the-world cruise, sailing west to join TF 77 off Korea where she patrolled off Cheju-do, the site of UN prisoner-of-war camps, then continuing homeward through the Indian Ocean and the Mediterranean, calling at various ports en route.

Daly's next extended cruise took her to Northern Europe and the Mediterranean between 28 July and 28 November 1955, after which she operated with Hunter-Killer Group 3 in the Caribbean until 10 April 1956. On 4 January 1957 she sailed from Newport for a cruise with the Middle East Force, implementing American foreign policy with visits to Freetown, Sierra Leone; Simonstown and Cape Town, Union of South Africa; Mombasa, Kenya; Karachi, Pakistan; Aden, Massawa, Eritrea; and the Canary Islands before returning to Narragansett Bay 7 June 1957.

Between 3 September and 27 November 1957, Daly cruised to Northern Europe and the Mediterranean, on NATO exercises and service with the 6th Fleet. Between 17 March and 11 October 1959, she returned to the Mediterranean, the Red Sea and Persian Gulf.

== Fate ==
On 2 May 1960, at Norfolk, she was decommissioned and placed in reserve. The ship was stricken from the Naval Vessel Register 1 December 1974. She was sold 22 April 1976, and broken up for scrap.

== Honours ==
Daly received eight battle stars for World War II service and one for Korean War service.
