= David C. Nichols =

United States Navy admiral

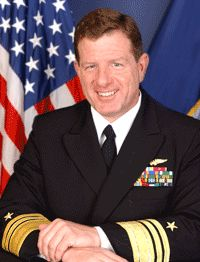
- Vice Admiral David C. Nichols Jr.
- Born: August 4, 1950 (age 76); Chattanooga, Tennessee, U.S.
- Military career
- Allegiance: United States of America
- Branch: United States Navy
- Service years: 1972–2007
- Rank: Vice Admiral
- Unit: US Central Command
- Commands: U.S. Naval Forces Central Command and United States Fifth Fleet; Naval Strike and Air Warfare Center; Carrier Group One; Carrier Air Wing Two; Attack Squadron 196
- Conflicts: Gulf War; Enduring Freedom; Iraqi Freedom/Iraq War

Vice Admiral David Charles Nichols Jr. is a retired senior U.S. Navy officer and Naval Flight Officer. At the time of his retirement in September 2007, he was the Deputy Commander of United States Central Command (USCENTCOM) at MacDill AFB, Florida.

Following graduation from the University of Tennessee, Vice Admiral Nichols was commissioned a Second Lieutenant in the United States Army through the Army ROTC program. He is also a graduate of U.S. Army Ranger School. After a lateral transfer to the United States Navy and Naval Flight Officer training at Naval Air Station Pensacola, Florida, he reported to NAS Whidbey Island, Washington, in October 1974 for training in the A-6 Intruder carrier-based attack aircraft.

Vice Admiral Nichols' duty at sea includes tours in Attack Squadron 145 (VA-145), Attack Squadron 165 (VA-165) and Attack Squadron 196 (VA-196). He commanded Attack Squadron 196 (VA-196) on board USS Independence in 1990-1991 during Operation Desert Shield and Carrier Air Wing Two at NAS Miramar, California and embarked on board USS Constellation in 1994-1995 during deployment to the Persian Gulf in support of Operation Southern Watch. He commanded Carrier Group One headquartered at NAS North Island in San Diego, California from July 2000 until November 2001. He then assumed the duties as Commander, United States Naval Forces Central Command (COMUSNAVCENT) and Commander, United States Fifth Fleet at Naval Support Activity Bahrain in Manama, Bahrain from October 2003 until November 2005.

His naval assignments ashore include duty as an Operational Test Director in Air Test and Evaluation Squadron 5 (VX-5) at Naval Air Weapons Station China Lake, California; Tactics Department Head at the Naval Strike Warfare Center/Strike University at NAS Fallon, Nevada; Executive Assistant to the Deputy Assistant Secretary of the Navy — Tactical Programs in Washington, D.C.; Attack Readiness Officer at Medium Attack and Tactical Electronic Warfare Wing, U.S. Pacific Fleet (MATVAQWINGPAC) at NAS Whidbey Island, Washington. He commanded the Naval Strike Warfare Center/Strike University (STRIKE U) at NAS Fallon in 1995-1996 and the Naval Strike and Air Warfare Center (NSAWC) at NAS Fallon from May 2002 to October 2003.

His joint duty includes Executive Assistant to the Commander in Chief, U.S. Pacific Command (USPACOM), at Camp Smith, Hawaii, from May 1996 until May 1998, and deputy director of Operations (DJ3) for U.S. Central Command at MacDill Air Force Base, Florida, from June 1998 until June 2000. He served as Deputy Commander, Joint Task Force Southwest Asia (JTF-SWA) and Combined Air Operations Center Director at Prince Sultan Air Base, Saudi Arabia, from November 2001 through March 2002 during Operation Enduring Freedom. During Operation Iraqi Freedom he was the USCENTCOM Deputy Combined Forces Air Component Commander (Deputy CFACC), again at Prince Sultan Air Base, from February to May 2003.

VADM Nichols is a distinguished graduate of the United States Naval War College, Newport, Rhode Island, and a graduate of the National Defense University's Joint and Combined Staff Officer School at the Joint Forces Staff College, Norfolk, Virginia. He completed Senior Executive programs at the Asia-Pacific Center for Security Studies in Honolulu and the Near East South Asia Center for Strategic Studies in Washington, D.C.

Following his retirement from the Navy, he has served as a Senior Mentor / Highly Qualified Expert to HQ USCENTCOM for periodic exercises, as an adjunct faculty member to the U.S. Naval War College, an advisor to the Center for Naval Analyses, and a board member of the Tailhook Association.

== Awards and decorations ==
VADM Nichols has over 5,000 flight hours in various models of Navy aircraft, including more than 4,000 hours in the A-6 Intruder. His personal awards include multiple awards of the Defense Distinguished Service Medal, Navy Distinguished Service Medal, Defense Superior Service Medal, Legion of Merit, Meritorious Service Medal, Air Medal, Navy Commendation Medal, and Navy Achievement Medal. He was a recipient of the U.S. Pacific Fleet Naval Flight Officer of the Year award as a Lieutenant Commander and the Senator Henry M. Jackson Memorial Leadership Award as a Commander.

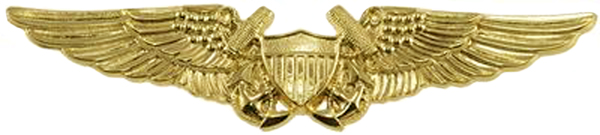
- Naval Flight Officer insignia

* Defense Distinguished Service Medal

- Navy Distinguished Service Medal
- Defense Superior Service Medal
- Legion of Merit
- Meritorious Service Medal
- Air Medal
- Navy and Marine Corps Commendation Medal
- Navy and Marine Corps Achievement Medal

Military offices
Preceded by Lance L. Smith	Deputy Commander of the United States Central Command; 2005–2007	Succeeded by Martin Dempsey
