= Daniel Daly =

United States Marine Corps Medal of Honor recipient (1873–1937)

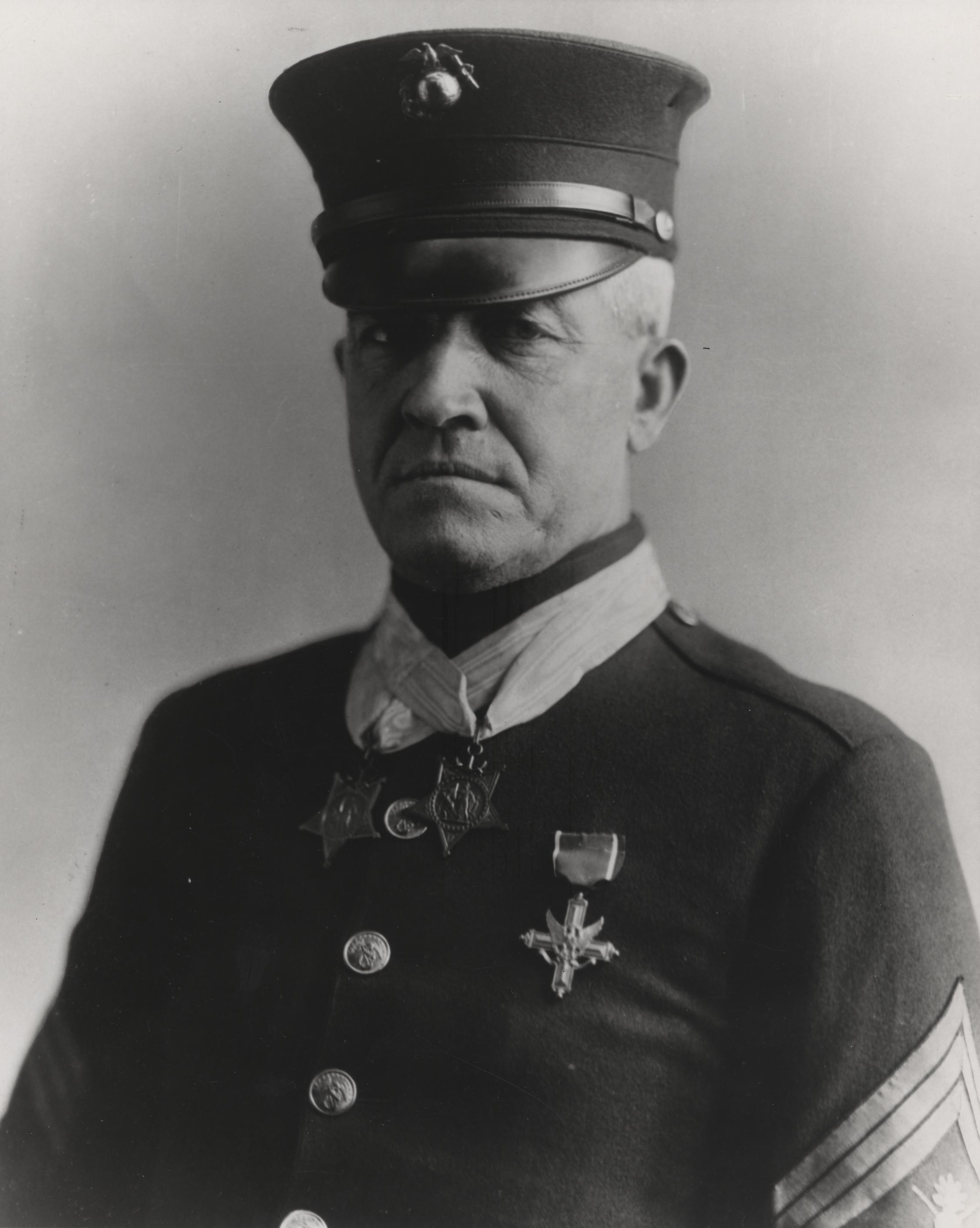
- Daly c. 1919, wearing his Medals of Honor and Distinguished Service Cross
- Born: Daniel Joseph Daly; November 11, 1873; Glen Cove, New York, U.S.
- Died: April 27, 1937 (aged 63); New York City, U.S.
- Burial place: Cypress Hills National Cemetery
- Military career
- Allegiance: United States
- Branch: United States Marine Corps
- Service years: 1899–1929
- Rank: Sergeant Major
- Units: 2nd Marine Regiment; 6th Marine Regiment
- Conflicts: Boxer Rebellion; Siege of the International Legations; Battle of Peking; Philippine–American War; Banana Wars; Battle of Veracruz; Battle of Fort Dipitié; Battle of Fort Rivière; World War I; Battle of Aisne; Battle of Belleau Wood; Battle of Saint-Mihiel; Battle of Blanc Mont Ridge; Meuse–Argonne offensive
- Awards: Medal of Honor (2); Navy Cross; Distinguished Service Cross; Citation Star; Purple Heart (2); Médaille militaire (France); Croix de Guerre (France)

Daniel Joseph Daly (November 11, 1873 – April 27, 1937) was a United States Marine and one of nineteen U.S. servicemen to have been awarded the Medal of Honor twice. Daly and Major General Smedley Butler are the only Marines who earned two Medals of Honor for two separate acts of valor.

Daly is among the most decorated U.S. Marines in history, and over a thirty year career saw action in all the major Marine Corps campaigns from 1899 to the end of World War I. He earned his first Medal of Honor during the Boxer Rebellion in 1900 and the second in Haiti in 1915. Butler described Daly as "the fightingest Marine I ever knew...It was an object lesson to have served with him." General John A. Lejeune called Daly "the outstanding Marine of all time."

In World War I, Daly became further cemented into Marine Corps lore when he is said to have yelled, "Come on, you sons of bitches, do you want to live forever?" to his company before charging the Germans at the Battle of Belleau Wood, though there is considerable evidence that the battle cry was the invention of an enthusiastic war correspondent. He was also awarded the Navy Cross and the Distinguished Service Cross for his actions in France.

Daly's Medals of Honor are on display at the National Museum of the Marine Corps in Triangle, Virginia, which also features the "live forever" quote etched in the stone of the building's rotunda.

== Early life ==
Daniel Joseph Daly was born on November 11, 1873, in Glen Cove, New York, on Long Island. He was a Roman Catholic of Irish descent. He spent his youth in New York City, working as a newsboy and a laborer. Despite his slight build—5 feet 6 inches (1.68 m) tall and weighing 132 pounds (60 kg)—Daly occasionally fought as a semi-pro boxer.

== Military career ==
=== Early career ===
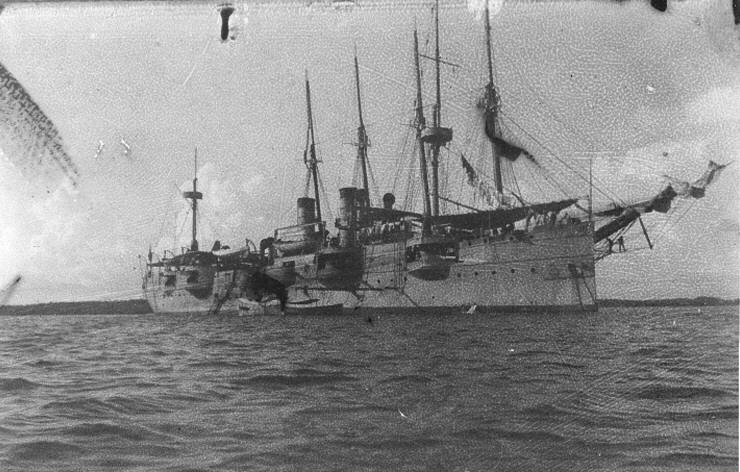
The USS Newark in 1898

Daly enlisted in the United States Marine Corps on January 10, 1899, at the age of 25. His first posting was with the Asiatic Fleet aboard the cruiser USS Newark. In 1900, the Newark arrived in China as part of the China Relief Expedition during the Boxer Rebellion. On July 15, 1900, during the 55-day Siege of the International Legations in Peking, Private Daly and his commanding officer, Captain Newt H. Hall, set out to reconnoiter a position on the Tartar Wall while under siege by the Boxers. A working party, scheduled to follow to construct defenses, never arrived. Daly volunteered to hold the position while Captain Hall returned for the working party, and single-handedly fought off a furious all-night Boxer attack, an action which earned him his first Medal of Honor. (Note: Daly's Medal of Honor citation is dated August 14, the day the Siege of the International Legations ended, and simply states that Daly "distinguished himself by meritorious conduct," making no specific mention of his heroism of July 15. This terseness was typical of Medal of Honor citations from this period. By contrast, Captain Hall's after action report praised Daly's "courage and fidelity" and detailed his actions in full.)

After leaving China, the Newark sailed for the Philippines in 1901, where Daly saw duty in the Philippine–American War. Later that year, Daly had two run-ins with military discipline: He was court-martialed once for drunkenness on post and spent three weeks in the brig at the Boston Navy Yard, and again three weeks later for drunkenness and verbal abuse of the sergeant of the guard.

After serving in the Philippines, Daly was assigned to various ships in the Caribbean area, seeing duty in Panama, Puerto Rico, and Cuba. He also trained recruits, worked as a guard at the Portsmouth Naval Prison, and gained a reputation as an excellent boxer. He was promoted to corporal in 1906 and sergeant in 1909. On March 14, 1911, Daly was garrisoned at the United States Naval Station in San Juan, Puerto Rico, when he spotted a gasoline fire that was spreading from the forecastle of the merchant schooner Springfield. Daly, with a party of nine other Marines and sailors, successfully extinguished the fire, though he spent several weeks hospitalized with severe burns. Daly received commendations from both the Secretary of the Navy and the Commandant of the Marine Corps for his actions.

At the outbreak of the Battle of Veracruz on April 21, 1914, Sergeant Daly landed in Veracruz, Mexico, with a combined force of 1,200 U.S. Marines and sailors. The American objective was to seize the customs house to prevent a shipment of German weapons—200 machine guns and 15 million rounds of ammunition, potentially to be used against the United States—from reaching shore. The ensuing battle saw intense street fighting, and the day after landing, Daly's platoon was pinned down in an arroyo, facing heavy sniper fire from a rooftop. Daly covertly crawled out of the ditch, entered the building from the rear and killed its entire seven man garrison, five by rifle fire and two by bayonet. By the end of the day, the Americans had captured the city.

Daly earned his second Medal of Honor in Haiti with the U.S. Marines supporting the Haitian government in a fight against Cacos insurgents. On the night of October 24–25, 1915, during the Battle of Fort Dipitié, Gunnery Sergeant Daly was on mounted patrol with a detachment of three squads—40 Marines total—from the 15th Company, 2nd Marine Regiment, under the command of Major Smedley Butler. The Marines were ambushed by a force of some 400 Cacos while crossing a river near the fort, and the horse carrying their machine gun was killed, its carcass sinking to the riverbed. With the battle raging throughout the night, Daly left the Marines' defensive position, swam the river under constant fire until he located the horse, freed the machine gun from its restraints, and carried the 200 pounds (91 kg) of weaponry and ammunition more than a mile back to the Marines' position. Butler wrote that Daly performed this feat on his own initiative, and that the major was surprised to see the machine gun, which he had been resigned to fighting without, set up back at the Marine camp. Butler further wrote that Daly moved "coolly and deliberately" and that he himself "wouldn't have had the courage" to undertake such an exploit. At daybreak, the Marines, rearmed and with Daly in command of one of the squads, routed the Cacos, capturing and destroying Fort Dipitié.

Three weeks later, on November 17, 1915, the Americans fought the Cacos once again in the decisive Battle of Fort Rivière. A combined force of U.S. Marines and sailors delivered a crushing blow to the final insurgent stronghold, ending the First Caco War. In a report to the commander of the 1st Marine Regiment, Captain William P. Upshur wrote that from October 15 to November 30, Daly showed "exceptional coolness and leadership of the men under fire," resulting in Daly receiving a letter of commendation from Secretary of the Navy Josephus Daniels. In Major Butler's report on the Fort Rivière campaign, he wrote that Daly was "the most conspicuous figure among the enlisted personnel. Daly is a real red-blooded marine and it was an object lesson to have served with him." Daniels, in announcing the Medal of Honor citations for the campaign, wrote that Daly displayed "conspicuous gallantry" at both the Battle of Fort Dipitié and the Battle of Fort Rivière. (Note: Daly's official Medal of Honor citation indicates it was awarded solely for his actions at the Battle of Fort Dipitié. However, in the Department of the Navy's General Order No. 319, dated August 25, 1917, Secretary Daniels wrote: "It will be noted that Gunnery Sergt. Daniel Daly is mentioned by the commandant for conspicuous gallantry at both Fort Dipitié and Fort Rivière.")

=== World War I ===
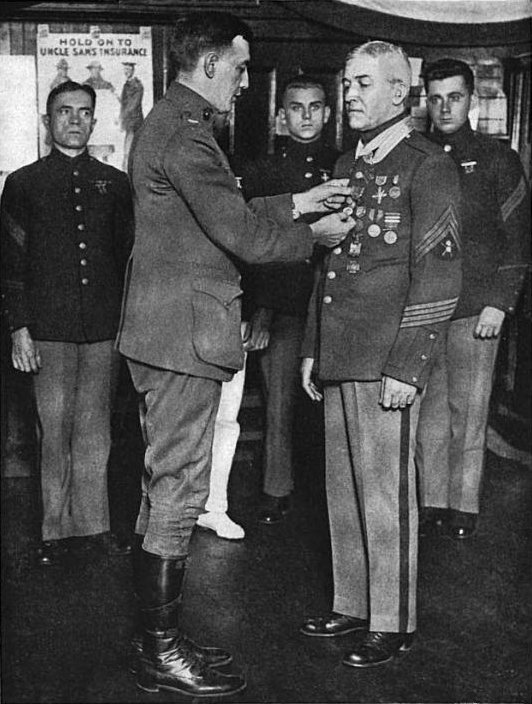
Daly being awarded the Médaille militaire

Daly's service in World War I began with his arrival in France on November 4, 1917, as first sergeant of 73rd Company, 6th Marine Regiment, 4th Marine Brigade, attached to the U.S. Army's 2nd Infantry Division. The division initially trained in the Toulon Sector, near Verdun (March–May 1918), and saw action at the Third Battle of the Aisne. At the outbreak of the Battle of Belleau Wood on June 1, 1918, Daly's regiment was placed in a gap in the line left by the French 43rd Division, with the intent to stop the German advance toward Paris. The Marines drove back an attack by the German 28th Division on June 2. On June 5, a German shell landed in an ammunition dump at Lucy-le-Bocage, starting a fire. Daly quickly led a party from his company into the flames to extinguish the blaze, preventing the arsenal from exploding.

On June 6, the Marines went on the offensive. The Germans were entrenched in a forest, separated from the Marines by 400 yards (370 m) of open wheat field. Facing 1,200 Germans with 200 machine guns, the 73rd Company was pinned down by intense fire. As the Marines took cover at nightfall, Daly walked openly to each of his machine gun positions, rallying and coordinating his men. On June 10, a German machine gun unit advanced close to Daly's position. Daly immediately charged the weapon, destroying it with three grenades, shot the unit's commanding officer with his .45 caliber pistol, and took its remaining 14 soldiers prisoner. As the battle raged later in the day, Daly exposed himself to enemy fire while evacuating the wounded. For his actions from June 5–10, Daly was awarded the Navy Cross, the Army's Distinguished Service Cross, and the French Médaille militaire.

Daly later fought in the Battle of Saint-Mihiel and the Battle of Blanc Mont Ridge. His final campaign was the Meuse–Argonne offensive. By the war's end, he had suffered a bullet wound in the shoulder and two shrapnel wounds in the leg. After serving in the American occupation force in Germany, Daly left active duty for the United States Marine Corps Reserve in 1919, and officially retired on February 6, 1929, at the rank of sergeant major.

== Legacy ==
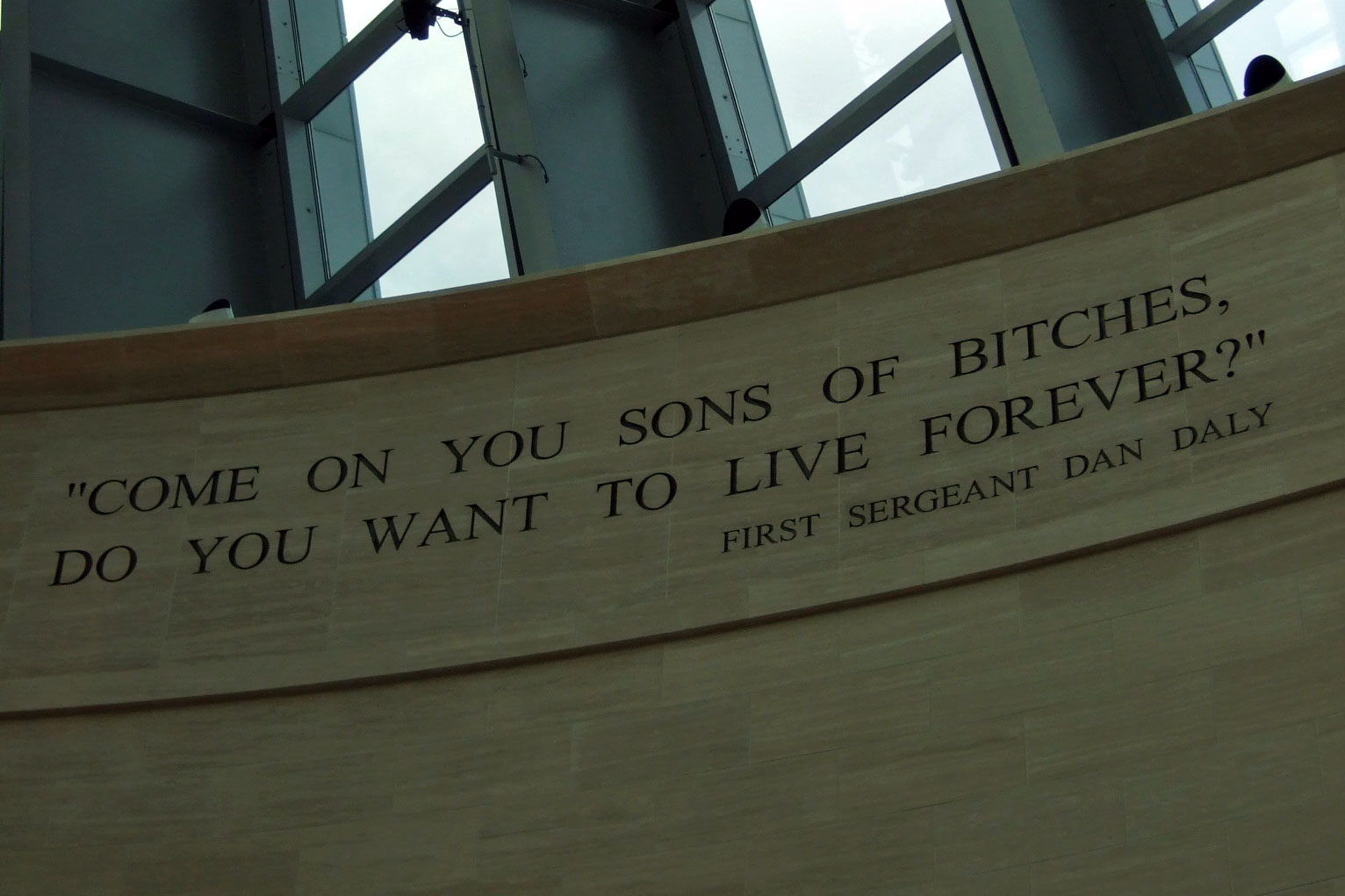
An engraving at the National Museum of the Marine Corps displaying the quote commonly attributed to Daly: "Come on, you sons of bitches, do you want to live forever?"

According to Marine Corps lore, Daly rallied his men at the Battle of Belleau Wood by yelling, "Come on, you sons-o'-bitches, do you want to live forever?" This quote first appeared in And They Thought We Wouldn't Fight, a 1918 memoir by war correspondent Floyd Gibbons of the Chicago Tribune. Gibbons, who was attached to Major Benjamin Berry's 3rd Battalion, 5th Marine Regiment, attributed the line to an unnamed gunnery sergeant in that unit. Popular legend eventually credited Daly (already well known as a double Medal of Honor recipient) with the rallying cry, despite discrepancies in the story—Daly was not a member of the 5th Marine Regiment but the 6th, which was positioned to the south of where Gibbons was reporting, and Daly was a first sergeant, not a gunnery sergeant. Historian Alan Axelrod wrote that "nobody has been found who actually heard [Daly] say it." Regardless, in May 1919, less than a year after the battle, Daly's story at Belleau Wood—incorporating the quote—was featured in "The Wood of Fair Water," one of six short films in The Rothapfel Unit Program, a motion picture directed by Marine veteran Samuel L. Rothapfel.

For his part, Daly told a Marine Corps historian that he yelled, "For Christ's sake, men—come on! Do you want to live forever?" Axelrod noted that Gibbons utilized artistic license "to impose order on chaos, to make sense of it, to extract some greater meaning from it" and that the details do not "diminish the reality the legend is based on." Irrespective of its origin, the quote has become deeply entrenched in Marine Corps lore, exemplified by the closing line of a 1954 eulogy of Daly in the Marine Corps Gazette: "But the Dan Daly of China, Haiti and France will remain part and parcel of our tradition as long as the Marine Corps contains any SOBs who want to live forever."

== Later life ==
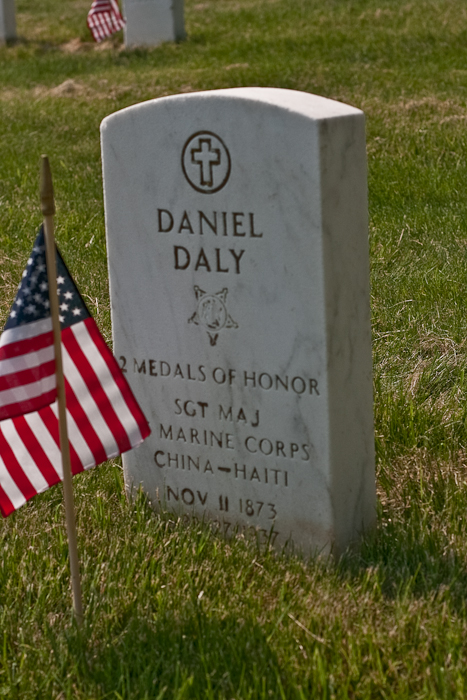
Daly is buried at Cypress Hills National Cemetery.

After leaving the Marines, Daly lived a quiet life with his sister in New York, working as a bank guard on Wall Street and avoiding publicity. He died of a heart attack in Glendale, Queens, New York, on April 27, 1937, aged 63. Instead of being interred at Arlington National Cemetery, Daly's family honored his wish that he remain near his home, and was buried at Cypress Hills National Cemetery in Brooklyn, New York.

== Decorations and honors ==
=== Honors ===
A Fletcher-class destroyer USS Daly (DD-519) was named in honor of Daly and was commissioned on March 10, 1943.

On November 10, 2005, the United States Postal Service issued its "Distinguished Marines" stamps in which Daly was honored alongside John Basilone, John A. Lejeune, and Chesty Puller.

=== Medals ===
Daly's decorations and medals includes two Medals of Honor; the Navy Cross; Distinguished Service Cross; two Purple Hearts; Good Conduct Medal with two bronze stars; the China Relief Expedition Medal; the Philippine Campaign Medal; the Marine Corps Expeditionary Medal with one bronze star; the Mexican Service Medal; the Haitian Campaign Medal; the World War I Victory Medal with Aisne, St. Mihiel, Meuse-Argonne, and Defensive-Sector clasps and Citation Star; three letters of commendation; the Médaille militaire (France); the Croix de Guerre with Palm (France); and the Fourragère (France).

Medal of Honor (first award)		Medal of Honor (second award)	
Navy Cross	Distinguished Service Cross	Purple Heart with 1 service star	Marine Corps Good Conduct Medal with 2 service stars
China Relief Expedition Medal	Philippine Campaign Medal	Marine Corps Expeditionary Medal with 1 service star	Mexican Service Medal
Haitian Campaign Medal	World War I Victory Medal with Aisne, St. Mihiel, Meuse-Argonne, and Defensive-Sector clasps, and Citation Star	Médaille militaire (France)	Croix de Guerre with bronze Palm (France)
Croix de Guerre Fourragère

=== Medal of Honor ===
==== First award: 1901 ====
- Awarded for actions during the China Relief
- General Orders: War Department, General Orders No. 55 (July 19, 1901)
- Action Date: August 14, 1900
- Service: Marine Corps
- Rank: Private
- Battalion: Captain Newt Hall's Marine Detachment
- Regiment: 1st Regiment (Marines)

Citation:

The President of the United States of America, in the name of Congress, takes pleasure in presenting the Medal of Honor (First Award) to Private Daniel Joseph Daly (MCSN: 73086), United States Marine Corps, for extraordinary heroism while serving with the Captain Newt Hall's Marine Detachment, 1st Regiment (Marines), in action in the presence of the enemy during the battle of Peking, China, 14 August 1900, Daly distinguished himself by meritorious conduct.

==== Second award: 1915 ====
- Awarded for actions during the U.S. Invasion and Occupation of Haiti
- Action Date: October 24, 1915
- Service: Marine Corps
- Rank: Gunnery Sergeant
- Company: 15th Company (Mounted)
- Regiment: 2d Marines

Citation:

The President of the United States of America, in the name of Congress, takes pleasure in presenting the Medal of Honor (Second Award) to Gunnery Sergeant Daniel Joseph Daly (MCSN: 73086), United States Marine Corps, for extraordinary heroism in action while serving with the 15th Company of Marines (Mounted), 2d Marine Regiment, on 22 October 1915. Gunnery Sergeant Daly was one of the company to leave Fort Liberte, Haiti, for a six-day reconnaissance. After dark on the evening of 24 October, while crossing the river in a deep ravine, the detachment was suddenly fired upon from three sides by about 400 Cacos concealed in bushes about 100 yards from the fort. The Marine detachment fought its way forward to a good position, which it maintained during the night, although subjected to a continuous fire from the Cacos. At daybreak the Marines, in three squads, advanced in three different directions, surprising and scattering the Cacos in all directions. Gunnery Sergeant Daly fought with exceptional gallantry against heavy odds throughout this action.

=== Distinguished Service Cross ===
- Awarded for actions during the World War I
- General Orders: War Department, General Orders No. 101 (1918)
- Action Date: June 5, 7, & 10, 1918
- Service: Marine Corps
- Rank: First Sergeant
- Company: 73d Company
- Regiment: 6th Regiment (Marines)
- Division: 2d Division, American Expeditionary Forces

Citation:

The President of the United States of America, authorized by Act of Congress, July 9, 1918, takes pleasure in presenting the Distinguished Service Cross to First Sergeant Daniel Joseph Daly (MCSN: 73086), United States Marine Corps, for repeated deeds of heroism and great service while serving with the Seventy-Third Company, Sixth Regiment (Marines), 2d Division, A.E.F., on 5 June and 7, 1918 at Lucy-le-Bocage, and on 10 June 1918 in the attack on Bouresches, France. On June 5th, at the risk of his life, First Sergeant Daly extinguished a fire in an ammunition dump at Lucy-le-Bocage. On 7 June 1918, while his position was under violent bombardment, he visited all the gun crews of his company, then posted over a wide portion of the front, to cheer his men. On 10 June 1918, he attacked an enemy machine-gun emplacement unassisted and captured it by use of hand grenades and his automatic pistol. On the same day, during the German attack on Bouresches, he brought in wounded under fire.

=== Navy Cross ===
- Awarded for actions during the World War I
- Action Date: June 5, 7, & 10, 1918
- Service: Marine Corps
- Rank: First Sergeant
- Company: 73d Company
- Regiment: 6th Regiment (Marines)
- Division: 2d Division, American Expeditionary Forces

Citation:

The President of the United States of America takes pleasure in presenting the Navy Cross to First Sergeant Daniel Joseph Daly (MCSN: 73086), United States Marine Corps, for repeated deeds of heroism and great service while serving with the 73d Company, 6th Regiment (Marines), 2d Division, A.E.F., on June 5 and 7, 1918 at Lucy-le-Bocage, and on 10 June 1918 in the attack on Bouresches, France. On June 5th, at the risk of his life, First Sergeant Daly extinguished a fire in an ammunition dump at Lucy-le-Bocage. On 7 June 1918, while his position was under violent bombardment, he visited all the gun crews of his company, then posted over a wide portion of the front, to cheer his men. On 10 June 1918, he attacked an enemy machine-gun emplacement unassisted and captured it by use of hand grenades and his automatic pistol. On the same day, during the German attack on Bouresches, he brought in wounded under fire.

=== Citation Star ===
In 1932 the Silver Citation Star became the Silver Star, a full sized decoration. All personnel awarded the Silver Citation Star were authorized to wear the Silver Star, the USA's third highest decoration for heroism in combat.

- Awarded for actions during the World War I
- General Orders: Citation Orders, 2d Division, American Expeditionary Forces
- Action Date: June 6–July 10, 1918
- Service: Marine Corps
- Rank: First Sergeant
- Company: Machine Gun Company
- Regiment: 6th Regiment (Marines)
- Division: 2d Division, American Expeditionary Forces

Citation:

By direction of the President, under the provisions of the act of Congress approved July 9, 1918 (Bul. No. 43, W.D., 1918), First Sergeant Daniel Joseph Daly (MCSN: 73086), United States Marine Corps, is cited by the Commanding General, SECOND Division, American Expeditionary Forces, for gallantry in action and a silver star may be placed upon the ribbon of the Victory Medals awarded him. First Sergeant Daly distinguished himself while serving with Machine Gun Company, Sixth Regiment (Marines), 2d Division, American Expeditionary Forces at Chateau-Thierry, France, 6 June – 10 July 1918.

== See also ==
- List of Medal of Honor recipients
- List of historic United States Marines
- List of Medal of Honor recipients for the Boxer Rebellion
