= Mark T. Emerson =

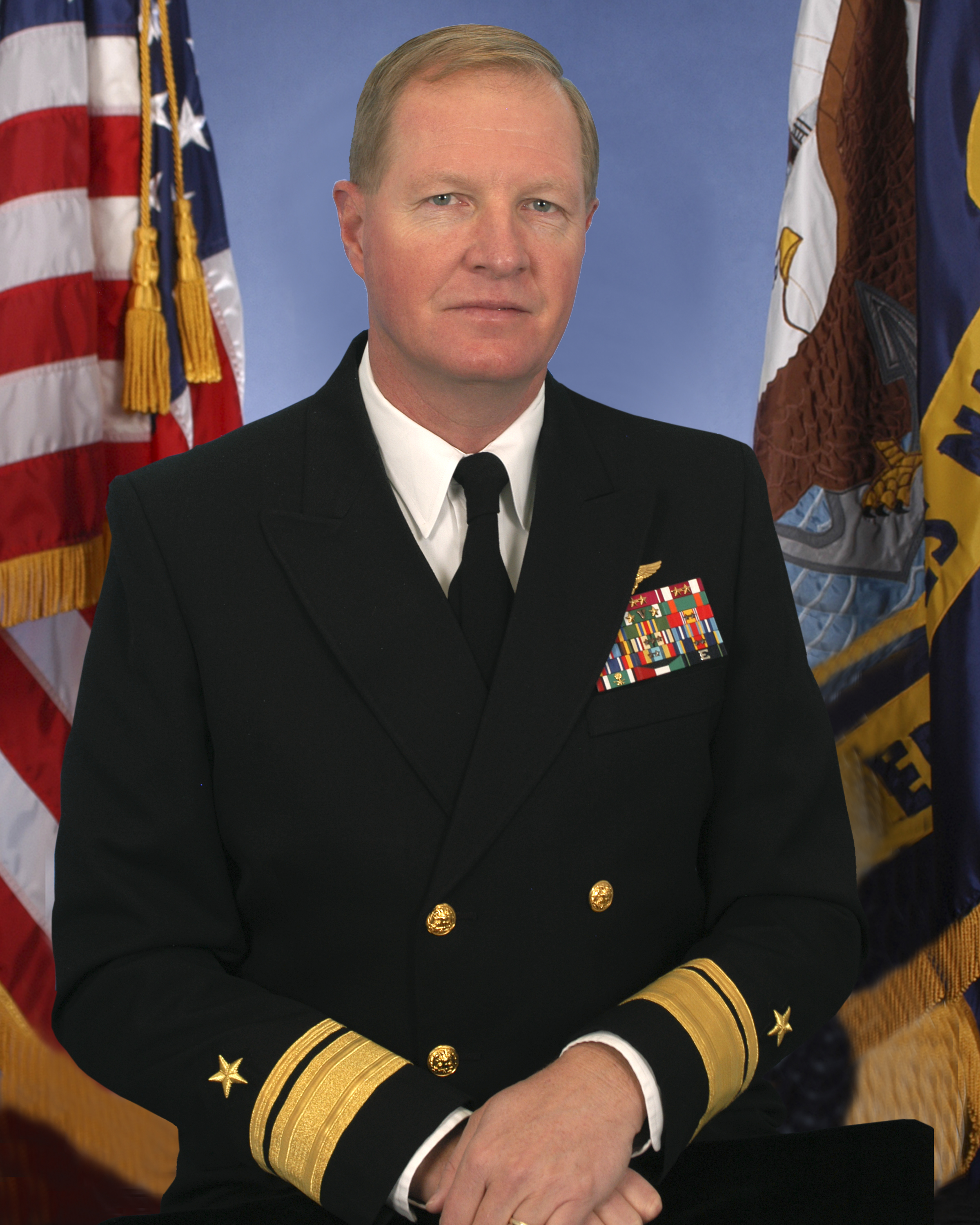
- Rear Admiral Mark Emerson
- Born: 1954 (age 71–72)
- Military career
- Allegiance: United States of America
- Branch: United States Navy
- Service years: 1976–2009
- Rank: Rear Admiral
- Commands: Naval Strike and Air Warfare Center; Strike Force Training Command, Pacific
- Conflicts: Gulf War; Operation Iraqi Freedom
- Awards: Defense Superior Service Medal; Legion of Merit; Meritorious Service Medal; Achievement Medal

Mark Thomas Emerson (born 1954) is a retired rear admiral of the United States Navy. He commanded the Naval Strike and Air Warfare Center in Fallon, Nevada from June 2006 to June 2009.

Prior to his final assignment, he served as commander of the Strike Force Training Command, Pacific. He also served as Assistant Deputy Commandant for Aviation for the United States Marine Corps.

== Education ==
- Bachelor's degree in Business Administration from the University of Florida.
- Master's degree from the National Defense University.
