= Newt (disambiguation) =

A newt is an aquatic animal.

Newt may also refer to:

- Newt (name), any of several people or fictional characters
- Newt, Kentucky, an unincorporated community
- HMS Newt, a British Second World War shore establishment
- Newt (programming library), a library for text-mode user interfaces
- Newt (film), a planned animated Pixar film cancelled in 2010
- Newt (band), a collaboration between Daniel Myer and Andreas Meyer
- The Newt in Somerset, a hotel and visitor attraction at Hadspen House, England
