= Thomas A. Cropper =

American naval officer (born 1959)

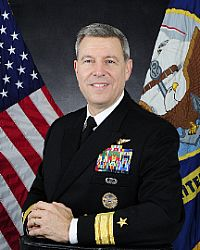
- Rear Admiral Thomas A. Cropper, USN
- Born: June 20, 1959 (age 67); Leonardtown, Maryland
- Alma mater: Iowa State University (BA); University of Tennessee (MA); Catholic University of America (MA); Naval War College (MA)
- Military career
- Allegiance: United States
- Branch: United States Navy; United States Maritime Service
- Service years: 1981–2012 (USN); 2012–present (USMS)
- Rank: Rear Admiral (USN); Rear Admiral (USMS)
- Commands: Commander, Strike Force Training Pacific (2010–2012); California State University, Maritime Academy (2012–2023)
- Conflicts: Operation Desert Storm
- Awards: Defense Superior Service Medal; Legion of Merit; Meritorious Service Medal

Thomas Albert Cropper (born June 20, 1959) is an American retired United States Navy rear admiral and retired academic administrator who previously served as president of the California State University Maritime Academy. Cropper was appointed on July 1, 2012 with the rank of honorary rear admiral in the U.S. Maritime Service.

== Early life and education ==
Born in Maryland, Cropper earned a Bachelor of Arts in engineering operations from Iowa State University in 1981. He also earned a Master of Arts in aviation systems from the University of Tennessee and Master of Arts in world politics from the Catholic University of America. He is a distinguished graduate of the Naval War College, earning a third Master of Arts in national security and strategic studies.

== Navy career ==
=== Operational assignments ===
Upon his graduation from Iowa State University, Cropper entered the U.S. Navy as an ensign and commenced flight training. During his thirty-one-year naval career, he served in a variety of command and staff positions. He was designated a Naval Aviator upon graduation from the strike jet training pipeline in 1982, followed by operational assignments with three aircraft carrier-based jet squadrons where he flew the A-6 Intruder and the F/A-18 Hornet. He went on to serve as the commanding officer of Strike Fighter Squadron 83 (VFA-83) an F/A-18 strike fighter squadron and as commander of Carrier Air Wing Eleven (CVW-11) aboard USS Nimitz. Cropper has embarked on eight extended overseas deployments aboard the aircraft carriers USS America (CV-66), USS Forrestal (CV-59), USS Enterprise (CVN-65), USS Eisenhower (CVN-69), and USS Nimitz (CVN-68) and flew nearly 5,000 hours in 43 different aircraft while logging over 1200 carrier arrested landings.

The PBS television series Carrier was filmed while Cropper commanded CVW-11 aboard the USS Nimitz, and he appears in several episodes.

=== Ashore ===
Cropper attended the U.S. Naval Test Pilot School, served as a military assistant in the Office of Secretary of Defense William Cohen, and as the Navy Federal Executive Fellow at the Brookings Institution. He also led "Strike University" at the Naval Strike and Air Warfare Center (NSAWC), served as chief of staff, U.S. Third Fleet, and headed the Joint Chiefs of Staff Working Group chartered with the development of national level security strategy.

=== Flag officer assignments ===
As a flag officer, Cropper served as Deputy Commander, U.S. Naval Forces Central Command, leading and managing over 24,000 people in combat operations as deputy commander, U.S. Naval Forces, U.S. Central Command. as well as Commander, Strike Force Training Pacific, where he directed education and at-sea training for navy ships and aviation squadrons deploying to the Western Pacific and the Middle East.

=== Retirement ===
He retired from the navy at the rank of rear admiral - lower half in 2012 and soon after assumed the duties as the president of the California Maritime Academy (CMA) (which over his tenure, was renamed to California State University, Maritime Academy). He retired from the position on August 1, 2023.

== Military awards ==
Rear Admiral Cropper's personal decorations include:

== Dates of rank ==
=== Navy ===
- Ensign: 1981
- Lieutenant Junior Grade: 1983
- Lieutenant: 1985
- Lieutenant Commander: 1990
- Commander: 1996
- Captain: 2002
- Rear Admiral: 2007

=== Maritime Service ===
- Rear Admiral: July 1, 2012
