= Commander, Strike Force Training Pacific =

- Active: October 7, 2005 - April 29, 2014
- Country: United States of America
- Branch: United States Navy
- Type: Fleet
- Role: Pacific Fleet Integrated/Advanced Training
- Part of: U.S. Third Fleet (COMTHIRDFLT)
- Garrison/HQ: Naval Air Station North Island, CA

Commander, Strike Force Training Pacific, abbreviated as CSFTP or COMSTRKFORTRAPAC, was the U.S. Fleet Forces Command formation charged with training and certifying Pacific Fleet Carrier Strike Groups, Amphibious Ready Groups, and independently deploying surface ships.

== Overview ==
Commander, Strike Force Training Pacific (CSFTP) was a 1-star command under Commander Third Fleet (COMTHIRDFLT) and was based at Naval Air Station North Island in San Diego, California. Tactical Training Group Pacific and Expeditionary Warfare Training Group Pacific were subordinate commands. CSFTP's mission: Through integrated training, mentorship and assessment at sea, Strike Force Training Pacific provided Fleet Commanders agile combat-ready maritime forces armed with worldwide deployable skill sets in order to support global operations. Mission.” The command was previously known as Commander, Carrier Group ONE (CCG-1).

== History ==
CSFTP began as Commander, Carrier Division One (ComCarDiv 1). Commander, Carrier Division One (ComCarDiv 1) was the first aircraft carrier formation in the United States when it was organized in October 1930 as part of the Aircraft Scouting Force, U.S. Fleet, operating in the Atlantic Ocean. In 1939, Carrier Division One was transferred to the Pacific Scouting Force. Aircraft carriers assigned to ComCarDiv 1 saw service in World War II, the Korean War, and the Vietnam War. In late February 1946 Midway became flagship for Carrier Division 1, operating in the Atlantic where she commenced flight training exercises in earnest. Arriving Yokosuka on 1 June 1957, USS Lexington embarked Rear Admiral H. D. Riley, Commander Carrier Division 1, and sailed as his flagship until returning San Diego on 17 October.

In June 1973, Commander, Carrier Division One was redesignated Commander, Carrier Group One (ComCarGru 1), and ComCarGru 1 took command of the Midway carrier battle group during its change of homeport to Yokosuka, Japan, on 5 October 1973, marking the first forward basing of a complete carrier task group overseas. In 1985, Commander Carrier Group One aboard Constellation led Battle Group Delta to the Western Pacific and Indian Ocean, including USS Crommelin. In December 1990, following commanding Battle Group Delta, ComCarGru 1 was designated Commander, Training Battle Group, with responsibility for the Carrier Battle Group Inter-Deployment Training Cycle (IDTC) within the U.S. Pacific Fleet.

In 2004, it became Carrier Strike Group 1, and in 2005 it was redesignated Commander, Strike Force Training Pacific. One reported date for the change of designation was October 7, 2005, but this does not agree with a February 2005 change of command ceremony in which the formation was already being referred to as Commander, Strike Force Training Pacific.

== Major training exercises ==
CSFTP trained carrier strike groups primarily during Composite Training Exercises (COMPTUEX) and Joint Training Force Exercises (JTFEX) off the California coast. CSFTP also trained Amphibious Ready Groups (ARG) with their embarked Marine Expeditionary Units (MEU), as well as other surface combatants not associated with a CSG or ARG.

Composite Training Exercises (COMPTUEXs) were designed to integrate all warfare areas of the CSG or ARG/MEU. JTFEXs provided the Strike Group with realistic training in joint operations prior to deployment. The exercise required integration of the CSG’s existing warfighting ability with other Joint and Combined assets to support warfare under a challenging threat scenario. Upon successful completion, CSFTP recommended deployment certification to Commander, Third Fleet.

In addition, Fleet Synthetic Training (FST) was used throughout the training cycle to prepare units to go to sea. Synthetic training utilized simulators and role players, and prepared units to go to sea at considerable savings in fuel, material, etc.

== Previous commanders ==
• Rear Admiral Carlton B. Jewett	(1 October 2004 – 11 February 2005)
• Rear Admiral Mark T. Emerson	(11 February 2005 – June 2006)
• Rear Admiral Gerald R. Beaman	(June 2006 – 11 January 2008)
• Rear Admiral David L. Philman	(11 January 2008 – 6 February 2009)
• Rear Admiral Kenneth E. Floyd	(6 February 2009 – June 2010)
• Rear Admiral Thomas A. Cropper	(June 2010 – August 2012)
• Rear Admiral David B. Woods	(August 2012 – September 2013)
• Rear Admiral Joseph W. Kuzmick	(September 2013 – April 2014)

== Disestablishment ==
Effective 29 April 2014, Strike Force Training Pacific was disestablished, and its training functions were transferred to Carrier Strike Group Fifteen.
