= Newton (given name) =

Notable people with given name Newton include:

== Real people ==
- Newton (singer), stage name of Billy Myers (born 1967), British firefighter turned pop singer
- Newton Araújo da Costa Júnior (born 2000), Brazilian footballer
- Newton D. R. Allen (died 1927), American politician
- Newton D. Baker, American lawyer and politician
- Newton Cloud (1804–1877), American politician and Methodist minister
- Newton Collins (1819–1903), American businessman
- Newton da Costa, Brazilian mathematician, logician and philosopher
- Newton de Souza, Brazilian businessman
- Newton E. Mason (1850–1945), United States Navy officer
- Newton Earp (1837–1928), American Old West pioneer and soldier
- Newton Faulkner (born 1985), English singer-songwriter
- Newton "Newt" Gingrich (born 1943), American politician and author
- Newton W. McConnell (1832–1915), Chief Justice of the Territorial Montana Supreme Court
- Newton James Moore, the eighth Premier of Western Australia
- Newton Lee, American computer scientist, non-profit entrepreneur and author
- Newton N. Minow (1926–2023), American attorney, Chairman of the Federal Communications Commission 1961–1963
- Newton Santos de Oliveira (born 1976), Lebanese former footballer
- Newton J. Tharp (1867–1909), American architect and painter
- Newton Alonzo Wells (1852–1923), American visual artist and educator

== Fictional characters ==
- Newton "Newt" Scamander, the protagonist of the Fantastic Beasts film series.
- Newton Pulsifer, a character in the novel Good Omens.
