= Richard Newte =

Richard Newte (1613–1678) was an Anglican clergyman and Rector of Tidcombe and Clare, Tiverton, Devon, England.

== Background ==
Newte was born at Tiverton and baptized on 24 February 1613, the third son of Henry Newte the elder, Tiverton's first Town Clerk after its incorporation in 1615. He was educated at Blundell's School and Exeter College, Oxford where he matriculated.

He became Rector of the Tidcombe portion of Tiverton on 24 September 1641 and, in addition, of the Clare portion the following month. He was appointed chaplain to Lord Digby the Earl of Bristol in 1641, then, after the Restoration, chaplain to Lord de la Warr. During the Civil War Newte was mostly travelling under Royal licence in continental Europe; he returned in 1646 to discover his parsonage at Clare in ruins and the area subject to the ravages of plague. Nevertheless, he was determined to return to the town and continue in his duties which he endeavored to do by using a place in the fields when the people would not enter the plague-hit town.

He married Thomasine Trobridge of Crediton and their first son was baptized 31 May 1654 at Tidcombe. His second son, John Newte, was born at Ottery St Mary in 1656 whilst he was temporarily denied his living at Tidcombe. John was, in due course, to follow his father as rector of Tidcombe. In 1666, Richard Newte was appointed Chaplain to Charles II although he appears not to have served owing to his suffering from gout and the distance of his residence from the royal court.
