= John Newte =

John Newte (1656–1716) was a high Anglican clergyman best remembered as the defender of the lawfulness of church music.

== Background ==
John Newte was born at Ottery St Mary on 15 January 1656, the son of Richard Newte (1613–1678) Rector of Tidcombe and Clare. John was the grandson of Henry Newte The Elder who had been the first Town Clerk of Tiverton after that town's incorporation in 1615 (Henry was succeeded in this office by his son Henry Newte The Younger). He was educated at Blundell's School, and Balliol College, Oxford, where he later obtained a fellowship. He became Rector of Tidcombe and Pitt Portions, Tiverton. After Oxford he was appointed Chaplain to Lord Digby, then after the Restoration Chaplain to Lord de la Warr. He was appointed Chaplain to Charles II although he appears not to have served owing to his suffering gout and his residence being distant from the royal court. Newte championed many charitable causes: giving money for the building of St Georges Chapel, Tiverton; raising monies for the installation of an organ in St Peter's Church, Tiverton; and, leaving land to Balliol College to found an exhibition for a Blundell's scholar in addition to having founded schools for the poor in Cove and Cullompton, Devon.

The National Portrait Gallery in London holds a line engraving of Newte by Michael Van der Gucht (after Thomas Forster).

== Publications ==
- Mr. Newte's sermon concerning the lawfulness and use of organs in the Christian church Printed by Freeman Collins, 1696
- The lawfulness and use of organs in the Christian Church. Asserted in a sermon preach'd at Tiverton ... upon the 13th of September, 1696. ... By John Newte, ..., printed by Freeman Collins, and sold by William Rogers; and Humphry Burton bookseller in Tiverton, 1701
- Roger Chamberline, Francis Plympton, Gent. appellants. John Newte, clerk. Respondent. The respondents case, Case heard before the House of Lords 1707
- A discourse shewing the duty of honouring the Lord with our substance, Printed by F.C. for W. Rogers [etc.], 1711
- A discourse shewing the duty of honouring the Lord with our substance, together with the impiety of tithe stealing, printed by F. C. for William Rogers, Richard Wilkin, and Benjamin Tooke, 1711

== Sources ==
- Records of the National Portrait Gallery, Extracted 6 August 2009
- Open Library, Record of works by John Newte, Extracted 6 August 2009
- Courtney, William Prideaux (1894). "Newte, John" . Dictionary of National Biography. Vol. 40. pp. 362–363.
