= USS Lexington (CV-16) =

Essex-class aircraft carrier of the US Navy

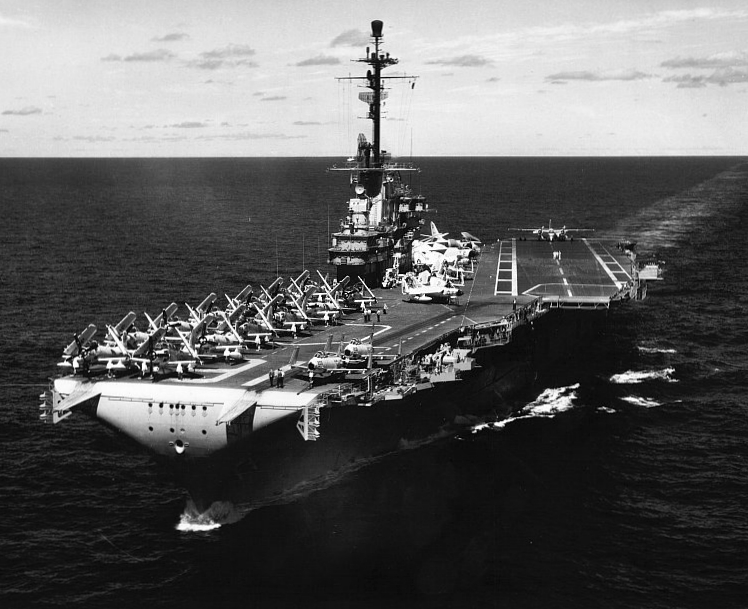
- USS Lexington underway on 16 August 1958

History

United States
- Name: Lexington
- Namesake: Battle of Lexington; USS Lexington (CV-2)
- Ordered: 9 September 1940
- Builder: Fore River Shipyard
- Laid down: 15 July 1941
- Launched: 23 September 1942
- Commissioned: 17 February 1943
- Decommissioned: 23 April 1947
- Recommissioned: 15 August 1955
- Decommissioned: 8 November 1991
- Reclassified: CVA-16, 1 October 1952; CVS-16, 1 October 1962; CVT-16, 1 January 1969; AVT-16, 1 July 1978
- Stricken: 8 November 1991
- Status: Museum ship

General characteristics
- Class & type: Essex-class aircraft carrier
- Displacement: 27,100 long tons (27,500 t) (standard); 36,380 long tons (36,960 t) (full load)
- Length: 820 feet (249.9 m) (wl); 872 feet (265.8 m) (o/a)
- Beam: 93 ft (28.3 m)
- Draft: 34 ft 2 in (10.41 m)
- Installed power: 8 × Babcock & Wilcox boilers; 150,000 shp (110,000 kW)
- Propulsion: 4 × geared steam turbines; 4 × screw propellers
- Speed: 33 knots (61 km/h; 38 mph)
- Range: 14,100 nmi (26,100 km; 16,200 mi) at 20 knots (37 km/h; 23 mph)
- Complement: 2,600 officers and enlisted men
- Armament: 12 × 5 in (127 mm) DP guns; 32 × 40 mm (1.6 in) AA guns; 46 × 20 mm (0.8 in) AA guns
- Armor: Waterline belt: 2.5–4 in (64–102 mm); Deck: 1.5 in (38 mm); Hangar deck: 2.5 in (64 mm); Bulkheads: 4 in (102 mm)
- Aircraft carried: 36 × Grumman F6F Hellcat; 36 × Douglas SBD Dauntless; 18 × Grumman TBF Avenger
- USS Lexington Museum on the Bay
- U.S. National Register of Historic Places
- U.S. National Historic Landmark
- Location within Texas Location within the United States
- Coordinates: 27°48′54″N 97°23′19″W
- Built: 1942
- NRHP reference No.: 03001043

Significant dates
- Added to NRHP: 31 July 2003
- Designated NHL: 31 July 2003

USS Lexington (CV/CVA/CVS/CVT/AVT-16) is an Essex-class aircraft carrier built during World War II for the United States Navy. Originally intended to be named Cabot, the new aircraft carrier was renamed while under construction to commemorate the recently lost USS Lexington (CV-2), becoming the sixth U.S. Navy ship to bear the name in honor of the Battle of Lexington.

Lexington was commissioned in February 1943 and saw extensive service through the Pacific War. For much of her service, she acted as the flagship for Admiral Marc Mitscher and led the Fast Carrier Task Force through their battles across the Pacific. She was the recipient of 11 battle stars and the Presidential Unit Citation. Following the war, Lexington was decommissioned, but was modernized and reactivated in the early 1950s, being reclassified as an attack carrier (CVA). Later, she was reclassified as an antisubmarine carrier (CVS). In her second career, she operated both in the Atlantic/Mediterranean and the Pacific, but spent most of her time, nearly 30 years, in Pensacola, Florida, as a training carrier (CVT).

Lexington was decommissioned in 1991, with an active service life longer than any other Essex-class ship. Following her decommissioning, she was donated for use as a museum ship in Corpus Christi, Texas. In 2003, Lexington was designated a National Historic Landmark. Though her surviving sister ships Yorktown, Intrepid, and Hornet carry lower hull numbers, Lexington was laid down and commissioned earlier, making her the oldest remaining fleet carrier in the world.

== Service history ==
=== World War II ===
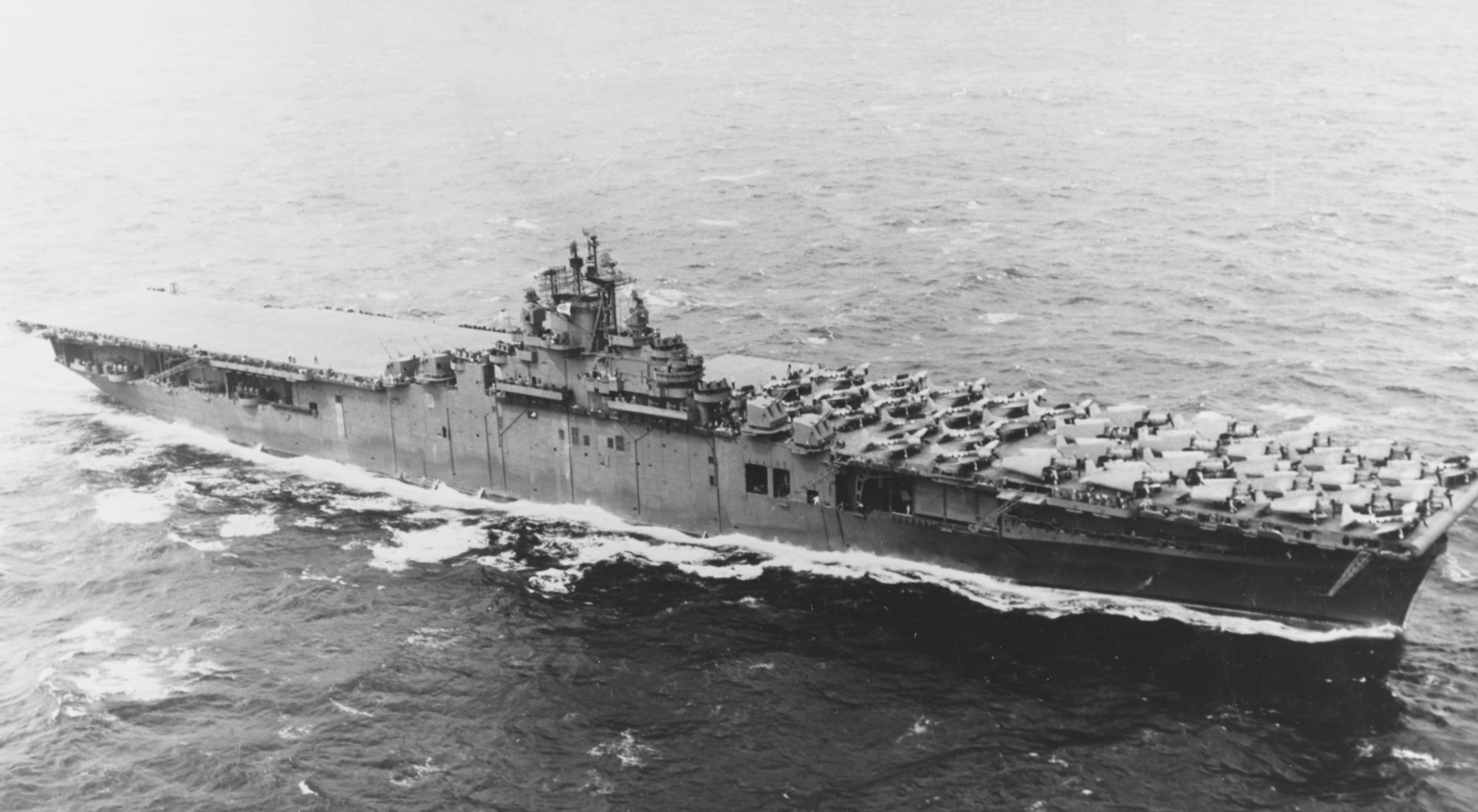
Lexington in her original configuration, November 1943

The ship was laid down as Cabot on 15 July 1941 by Fore River Shipyard in Quincy, Massachusetts. In May 1942, USS Lexington (CV-2), which had been built in the same shipyard two decades earlier, was sunk at the Battle of the Coral Sea. In June, workers at the shipyard submitted a request to Navy Secretary Frank Knox to change the name of a carrier currently under construction there to Lexington. Knox agreed to the proposal and Cabot was renamed Lexington on 16 June 1942, the sixth U.S. Navy ship to bear the name of the Revolutionary War Battle of Lexington. She was launched on 23 September 1942, sponsored by Mrs. Theodore Douglas Robinson. Lexington was commissioned on 17 February 1943, with Captain Felix Stump in command. After a shakedown cruise in the Caribbean, Lexington sailed via the Panama Canal to join the Pacific fleet.

One of the carrier's first casualties was 1939 Heisman Trophy winner Nile Kinnick. During the ship's initial voyage (to the Caribbean) in 1943, Kinnick and other naval fliers were conducting training flights off her deck. The Grumman F4F Wildcat flown by Kinnick developed a serious oil leak while airborne and was unable to return to Lexington, crashing into the sea four miles from the ship. Neither Kinnick nor his plane were recovered.

Lexington arrived at Pearl Harbor on 9 August 1943, and participated in a raid on Tarawa air bases in late September, followed by a raid against Wake Island in October, before returning to Pearl Harbor to prepare for the Gilbert Islands operation. From 19 to 24 November, she made searches and flew sorties in the Marshalls, covering the landings in the Gilberts. Her aviators downed 29 enemy aircraft on 23 and 24 November.

==== Kwajalein raid ====
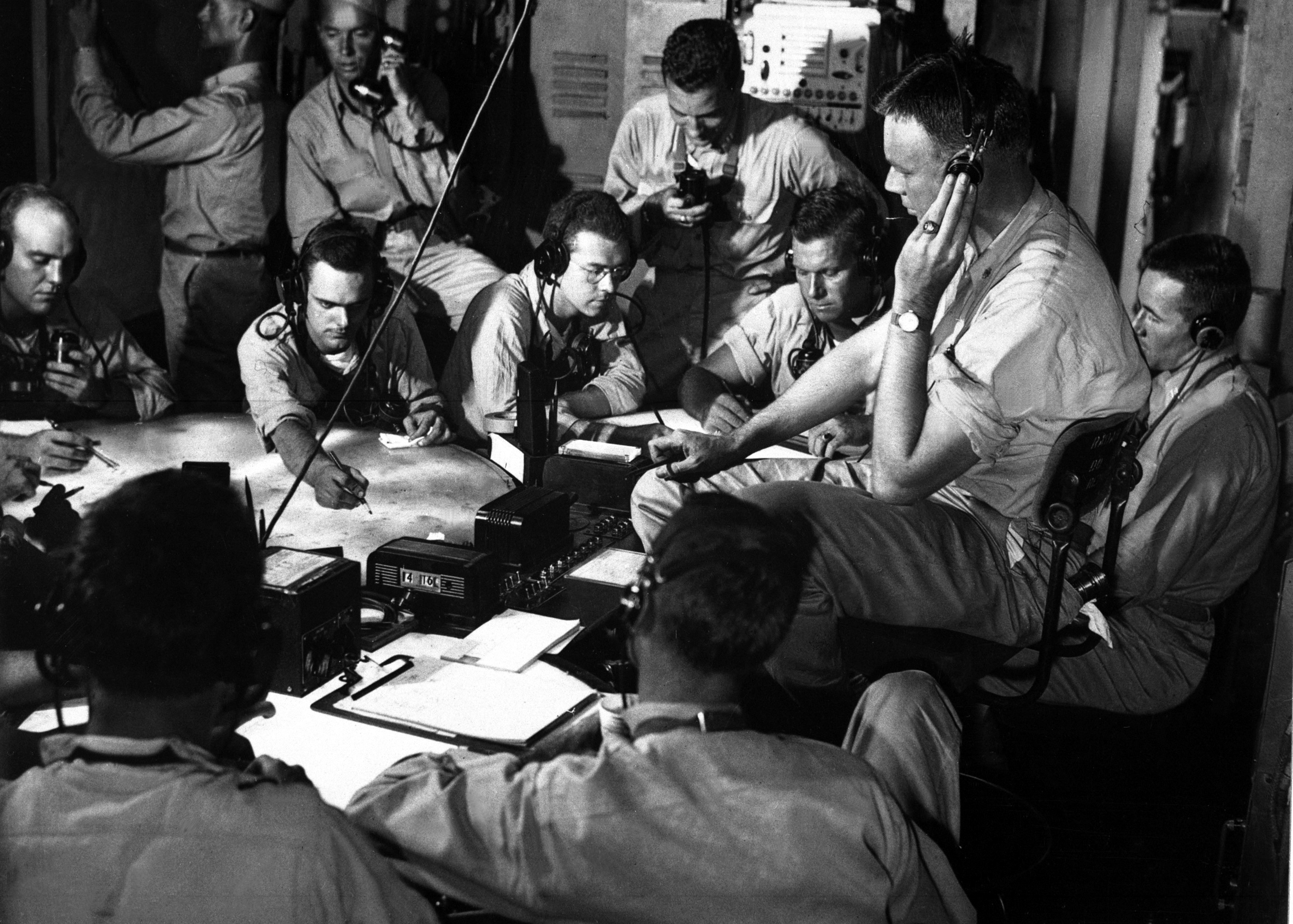
Chart room on board Lexington as the ship maneuvers during a strike on the Gilbert and Marshall Islands, December 1943

Lexington sailed to raid Kwajalein on 4 December 1943. Her morning strike destroyed the SS Kembu Maru, damaged two cruisers, and accounted for 30 enemy aircraft. The carrier was attacked at midday by six Tenzan torpedo bombers of the 531st Kōkūtai, two were shot down by flak while attacking the carrier, but the task force was ordered not to open fire at night, as Admiral Charles Pownall, then in command, believed it would give their position away. He was later replaced.

At 19:20 that night, a major air attack began while the task force was underway off Kwajalein. At 23:22, parachute flares from Japanese planes silhouetted the carrier, and 10 minutes later, she was hit by a torpedo on the starboard side, knocking out her steering gear. Nine people were killed, two on the fantail and seven in the chief petty officers' mess room, which was a repair party station during general quarters. Four members of the affected repair party survived because they were sitting on a couch that apparently absorbed the shock of the explosion. Settling 5 feet (2 m) by the stern, the carrier began circling to port amidst dense clouds of smoke pouring from ruptured tanks aft. To maintain water-tight integrity, damage-control crews were ordered to seal the damaged compartments and welded them shut, applying heavy steel plates where needed. An emergency hand-operated steering unit was quickly devised, and Lexington made for Pearl Harbor for emergency repairs, arriving on 9 December. She reached Bremerton, Washington, on 22 December for full repairs, completed on 20 February 1944. The error in judgment concerning opening fire at night was never repeated, as thereafter gun crews were ordered to open fire anytime the ship came under attack. Following this attack, the ship was reported as sunk by Japan's Tokyo Rose, the first of several such assertions.

==== Battle of the Philippine Sea ====
Lexington returned to Majuro in time to be present when Rear Admiral Mitscher took command of the newly formed Task Force 58 (TF 58) on 8 March 1944. Mitscher took Lexington as his flagship, and after a warm-up strike against Mille, the Fast Carrier Task Force began a series of operations against the Japanese positions in the central Pacific. She supported Army landings at Hollandia (currently known as Jayapura) on 13 April, and then raided the strongpoint of Truk on 28 April. Heavy counterattacks left Lexington untouched, her planes splashing 17 enemy fighters, but for the second time, Japanese propaganda announced her as sunk.

A surprise fighter strike on Saipan on 11 June nearly eliminated all air opposition over the island, then battered it from the air for the next five days. On 16 June, Lexington fought off a fierce attack by Japanese torpedo bombers based on Guam, once again emerging unhurt, but "sunk" a third time by propaganda pronouncements. As Japanese opposition to the Marianas operation provoked the Battle of the Philippine Sea on 19–20 June, Lexington played a major role in TF 58's great victory in what was later called the "Great Marianas Turkey Shoot". With over 300 enemy aircraft destroyed the first day, and a carrier, a tanker, and a destroyer sunk the second day, American aviators nearly knocked Japanese naval aviation out of the war; with the planes went the trained and experienced pilots without whom Japan could not continue air warfare at sea.

Using Eniwetok as her base, Lexington sent aircraft on sorties over Guam and against the Palaus and Bonins into August. She arrived in the Carolinas on 7 September for three days of strikes against Yap and Ulithi, then began attacks on Mindanao, the Visayas, the Manila area, and shipping along the west coast of Luzon, preparing for the coming assault on Leyte. Her task force then blasted Okinawa on 10 October and Formosa two days later to destroy bases from which opposition to the Philippines campaign might be launched. She was again unscathed through the air battle fought after the Formosa assault.

==== Battle of Leyte Gulf ====
Now covering the Leyte landings, Lexington's aircraft scored importantly in the Battle of Leyte Gulf, the climactic American naval victory over Japan. While the carrier came under constant enemy attack in the engagement, she was not damaged during the main battle. In exchange, her aircraft served in the battle of the Sibuyan Sea, where they assisted in sinking the Japanese "super battleship" Musashi, one of the two largest and most powerful battleships in the world (alongside her sistership Yamato) and scored hits on three cruisers on 24 October 1944, including a torpedo hit that crippled the heavy cruiser Myōkō, forcing her out of the battle alongside two destroyers to escort her.

The next day, Lexington's aircraft served in the battle off Cape Engano against Japanese aircraft carriers. With Essex aircraft, they sank the light carrier Chitose, and in conjunction with Franklin aircraft, crippled the light carrier Chiyoda (later finished off by a US cruiser task force consisting of New Orleans, Wichita, Santa Fe, and Mobile). Meanwhile, her aircraft alone sank the fleet carrier Zuikaku. During the battle of the Coral Sea on May 8, 1942, Zuikaku's air group landed two torpedo hits that were the primary reason behind Lexington (CV-2)'s sinking, thus Lexington avenged her fallen predecessor. Later in the day, alongside Intrepid aircraft, Lexington's aircraft sank the light carrier Zuihō.

As the retiring Japanese were pursued, her aircraft then sank the heavy cruiser Nachi with four torpedo hits on 5 November off Luzon. Later that day, Lexington was introduced to the kamikaze as a flaming Japanese aircraft crashed near her island, destroying most of the island structure and spraying fire in all directions. Within 20 minutes, major blazes were under control, and she was able to continue normal flight actions, as well as shooting down a kamikaze heading for Ticonderoga. On 9 November, Lexington arrived in Ulithi to repair battle damage while hearing that Tokyo once again claimed her as sunk. Lexington suffered 50 killed and 132 wounded in this attack.

Chosen as the flagship for Task Group 58.2 (TG 58.2) on 11 December, she struck at the airfields of Luzon and Formosa during the first nine days of January 1945, encountering little enemy opposition. The task force then entered the South China Sea to strike enemy shipping and air installations. Strikes were flown against Saipan, Cam Ranh Bay in then Indochina, Hong Kong, the Pescadores, and Formosa. Task force planes sank four merchant ships and four escorts in one convoy and destroyed at least 12 in another, at Camranh Bay on 12 January. Leaving the China Sea on 20 January, Lexington sailed north to strike Formosa again on 21 January and Okinawa again on 22 January. After replenishing at Ulithi, TG 58.2 sailed on 10 February to hit airfields near Tokyo on 16 February 1945, and on 17 February to minimize opposition to the Iwo Jima landings on 19 February. Lexington flew close support for the assaulting troops from 19 to 22 February, then sailed for further strikes against the Japanese home islands and the Nansei Shoto before heading for overhaul at Puget Sound.

==== Rear Admiral Sprague's task force ====
Lexington was combat-bound again on 22 May 1945, sailing via Alameda and Pearl Harbor for San Pedro Bay, Leyte, where she joined Rear Admiral Thomas L. Sprague's task force for the final round of air strikes, which battered the Japanese home islands from July-15 August, when the last strike was ordered to jettison its bombs and return to Lexington on receiving word of the Japanese surrender. During this period, she had launched attacks on Honshū and Hokkaidō airfields, and Yokosuka and Kure naval bases to destroy the remnants of the Japanese fleet. In the actions at Kure, F4U-1D Corsairs of VBF94 flying off Lexington sank the hybrid battleship/aircraft carrier Ise. Flying against heavy enemy fire, squadron commander Lester Wall, Jr., dropped a 1,000 lb bomb down her stack, exploding her boilers and breaking her keel in a conflagration matching that of the destruction of the USS Arizona at Pearl Harbor four years earlier. The lieutenant commander and several men in his squadron were awarded the Navy Cross for this action. She had also flown bombing attacks on industrial targets in the Tokyo area.

After hostilities ended, her aircraft continued to fly air patrols over Japan. The previously mentioned Lieutenant Commander Wall first located and then led in supply drops to prisoner-of-war camps on Honshū that had been abandoned by the Japanese. He was subsequently awarded the Distinguished Flying Cross for this mission. In December, she was used to ferry home servicemen in what was known as Operation Magic Carpet, arriving in San Francisco on 16 December.

=== After the war ===
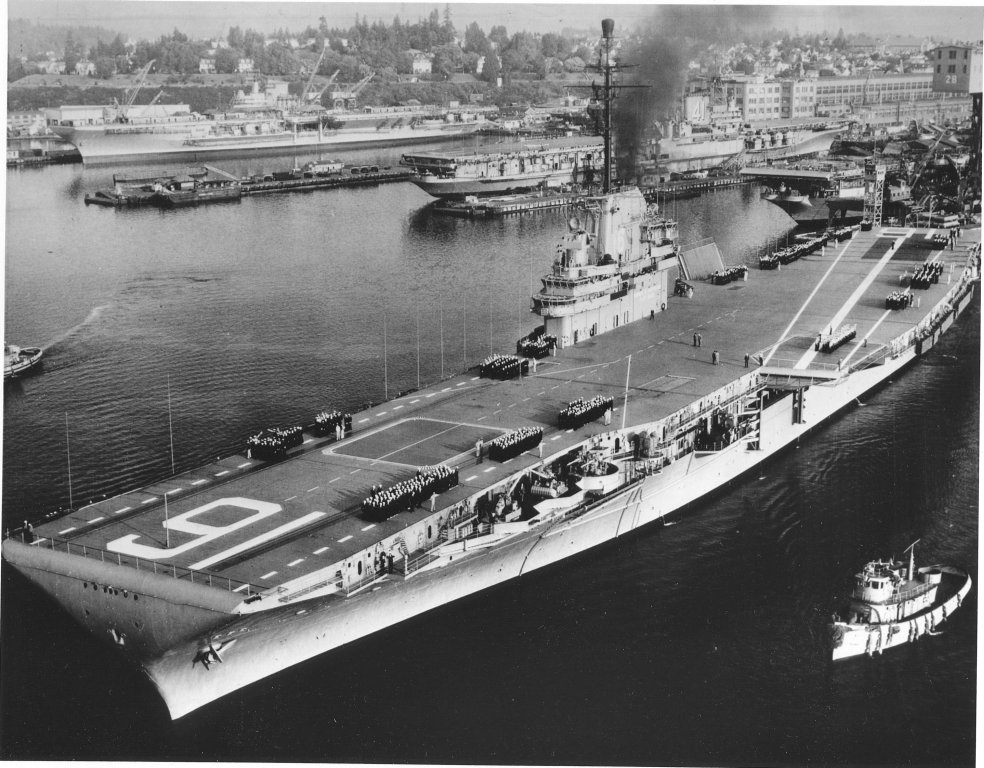
Lexington departs Puget Sound in 1955 to undertake sea trials following her massive SCB-27/SCB-125 conversion

Lexington was decommissioned at Bremerton on 23 April 1947, and entered the National Defense Reserve Fleet. While in reserve, she was designated attack carrier CVA-16 on 1 October 1952. In September 1953, Lexington entered the Puget Sound Naval Shipyard. She received the Essex-class SCB-27C and SCB-125 conversions in one refit, being then able to operate the most modern jet aircraft. The most visible distinguishing features were an angled flight deck, steam catapults, a new island, and the hurricane bow. Lexington was recommissioned on 15 August 1955, Captain A. S. Heyward Jr. in command. Assigned to San Diego as her home port, she operated off California until May 1956, sailing then for a six-month deployment with the 7th Fleet. She based on Yokosuka for exercises, maneuvers, and search-and-rescue missions off the coast of China, and called at major Far Eastern ports until returning to San Diego on 20 December. She next trained Air Group 12, which deployed with her on the next 7th Fleet deployment. Arriving at Yokosuka on 1 June 1957, Lexington embarked Rear Admiral H. D. Riley, Commander Carrier Division 1, and sailed as his flagship until returning to San Diego on 17 October.

Following overhaul at Bremerton, her refresher training was interrupted by the Second Taiwan Strait Crisis; on 14 July 1958, she was ordered to embark Air Group 21 at San Francisco and sail to reinforce the 7th Fleet off Taiwan, arriving on station on 7 August and returning to San Diego on 19 December. Now the first carrier whose planes were armed with AGM-12 Bullpup guided missiles, Lexington left San Francisco on 26 April 1959 for another tour of duty with the 7th Fleet. She was on standby alert during the Laotian crisis of late August and September. Following this, she conducted exercises with British naval forces before returning to San Diego, arriving on 2 December. In early 1960, she underwent an overhaul at the Puget Sound Naval Shipyard.

Lexington's next Far Eastern tour began late in 1960 and was extended well into 1961 by renewed tension in Laos. Returning to West Coast operations, she was ordered in January 1962 to prepare to relieve Antietam as aviation training carrier in the Gulf of Mexico, and she was redesignated CVS-16 on 1 October 1962. During the Cuban Missile Crisis, though, she resumed duty as an attack carrier, and she did not relieve Antietam until 29 December 1962 at Pensacola, Florida.

Into 1969, Lexington operated out of her home port, Pensacola, as well as Corpus Christi, qualifying student aviators and maintaining the high state of training of both active-duty and reserve naval aviators. Her work became of increasing significance as she prepared the men vital to the Navy and Marine Corps operations over Vietnam, where naval aviation played a major role. Lexington marked her 200,000th arrested landing on 17 October 1967, was redesignated CVT-16 on 1 January 1969, and was redesignated again as AVT-16 on 1 July 1978. She continued as a training carrier for the next 22 years, until she was relieved by Forrestal; Lexington was decommissioned and struck on 8 November 1991.

On 18 August 1980, Lexington became the first aircraft carrier in United States naval history to have women stationed aboard as crew members. In April 1982, helicopters from the Lexington discovered three fisherman adrift in the ocean after their boat had capsized, and the individuals were taken safely aboard. Later that year, the carrier entered her yearly maintenance period, where a need for a major overhaul became apparent for the nearly 40-year-old carrier to continue to operate.

The cost at the time was estimated to be $100 million to keep the carrier operating to her then-scheduled 1989 decommissioning date. Appropriations for this overhaul were slow to come; meanwhile, the carrier continued operations. In January 1984, an on-board radio station (WLEX) was established for the crew, broadcasting news, weather, and music from the training vessel. It was followed up by a closed-circuit television station. On March 8, 1984, Lexington recorded her 250,000th catapult shot. Near the end of 1984, an appropriation was finally made for a $83.3M overall, which began in mid-August 1985. During the modernization, her wooden flight deck was replaced with steel, echoing a similar plan for the reactivation of the USS Oriskany in 1981.

In 1986, Lexington was the site of a Bob Hope televised special celebrating the 75th anniversary of naval aviation. The ship was also used a stand-in for the Enterprise,Yorktown, and Akagi in the filming of the mammoth 1988 miniseries War and Remembrance. In 1988, during a maintenance period, she received an additional $10M of renovations to her high-pressure turbines. On 29 October 1989, a student naval aviator lost control of his T-2 training aircraft after an aborted attempt to land on Lexington's flight deck. The aircraft inverted and hit the island with its left wing, killing four crew members (including the pilot of the plane, who had begun an ejection sequence) and one civilian maintenance worker and injuring 17. The island suffered no major damage, and fires from the burning fuel were extinguished within 15 minutes.

By 1990, the intended retirement date for the aged training carrier had passed, yet the Lexington continued to serve. The wind-down of the Cold War, though, led the US Navy to finally announce in September 1990 that the ship would be decommissioned the following year. On 9 March, 1991, Lieutenant Kathy Owens recorded the 493,760th landing onboard the carrier. This was Lexington's final arrested landing; the Navy suspended all further operations due to safety and engineering problems. The ship was no longer able to operate under her own power and had to be towed to the Pensacola Naval Station. On 8 November 1991, Lexington was decommissioned. The Lexington was the final Essex-class carrier in commission, after USS Oriskany had been decommissioned in 1976.

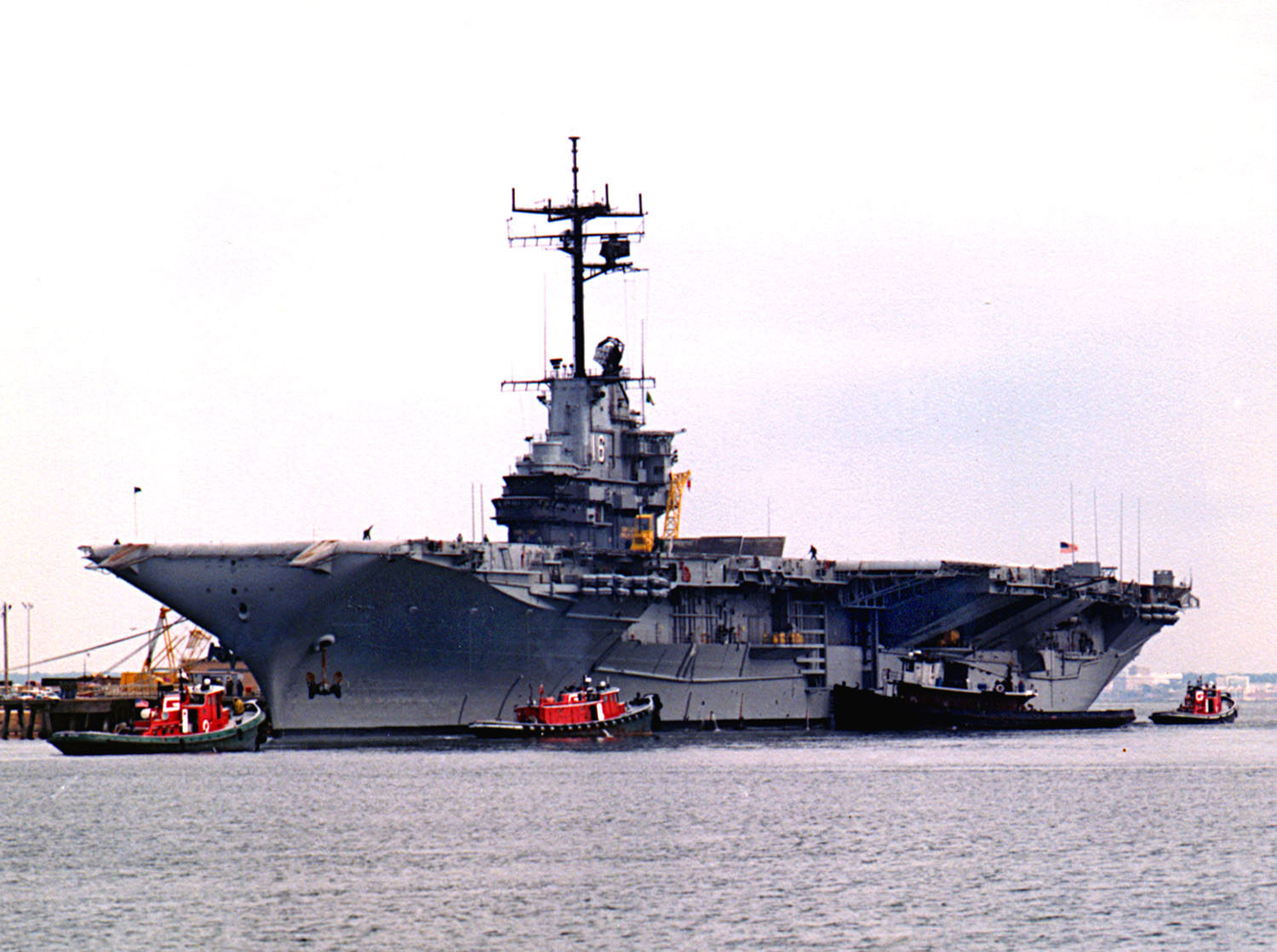
Lexington putting to sea from Pensacola in 1987

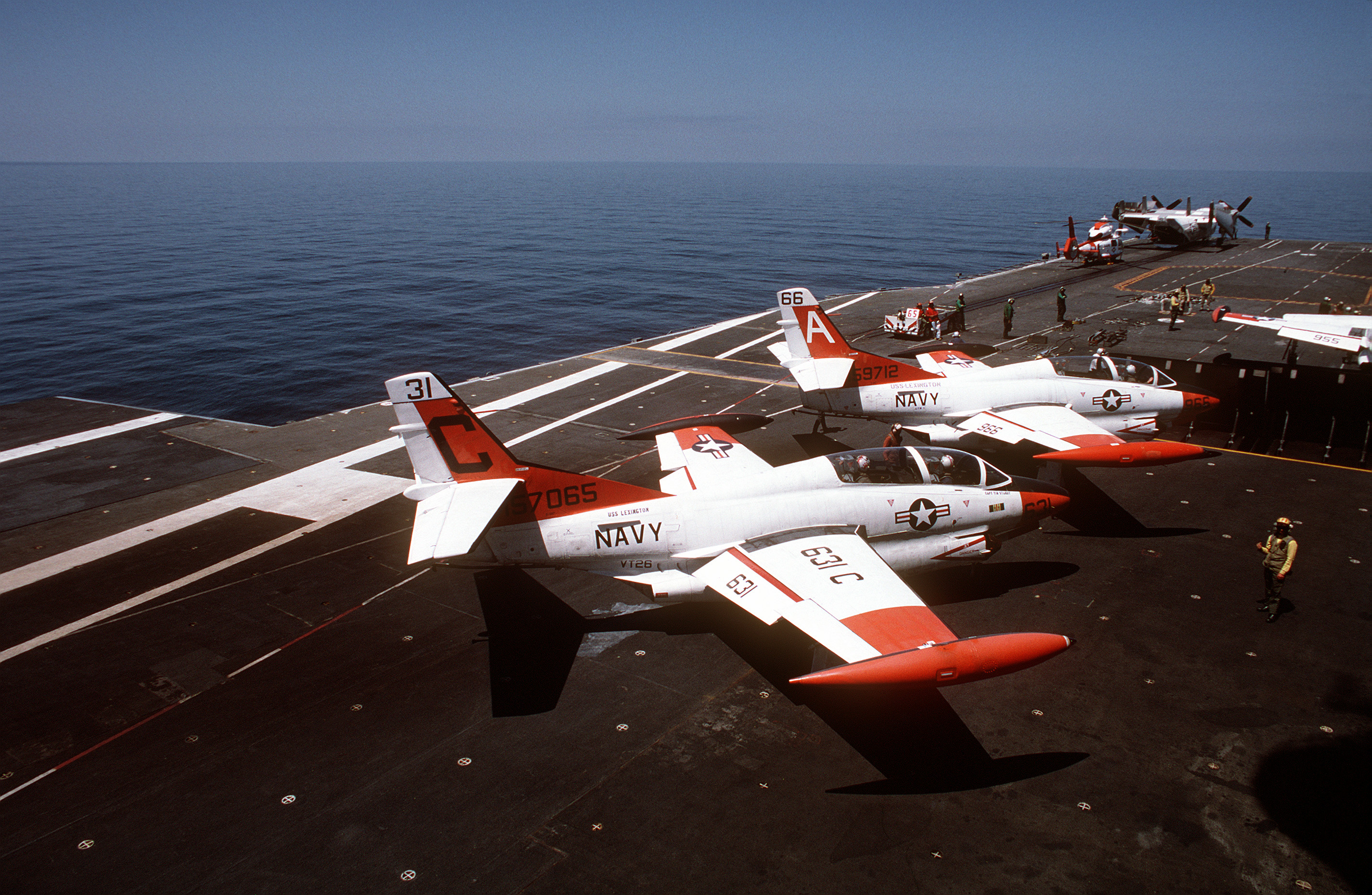
A pair of T-2s wait to be catapulted from Lexington in 1989

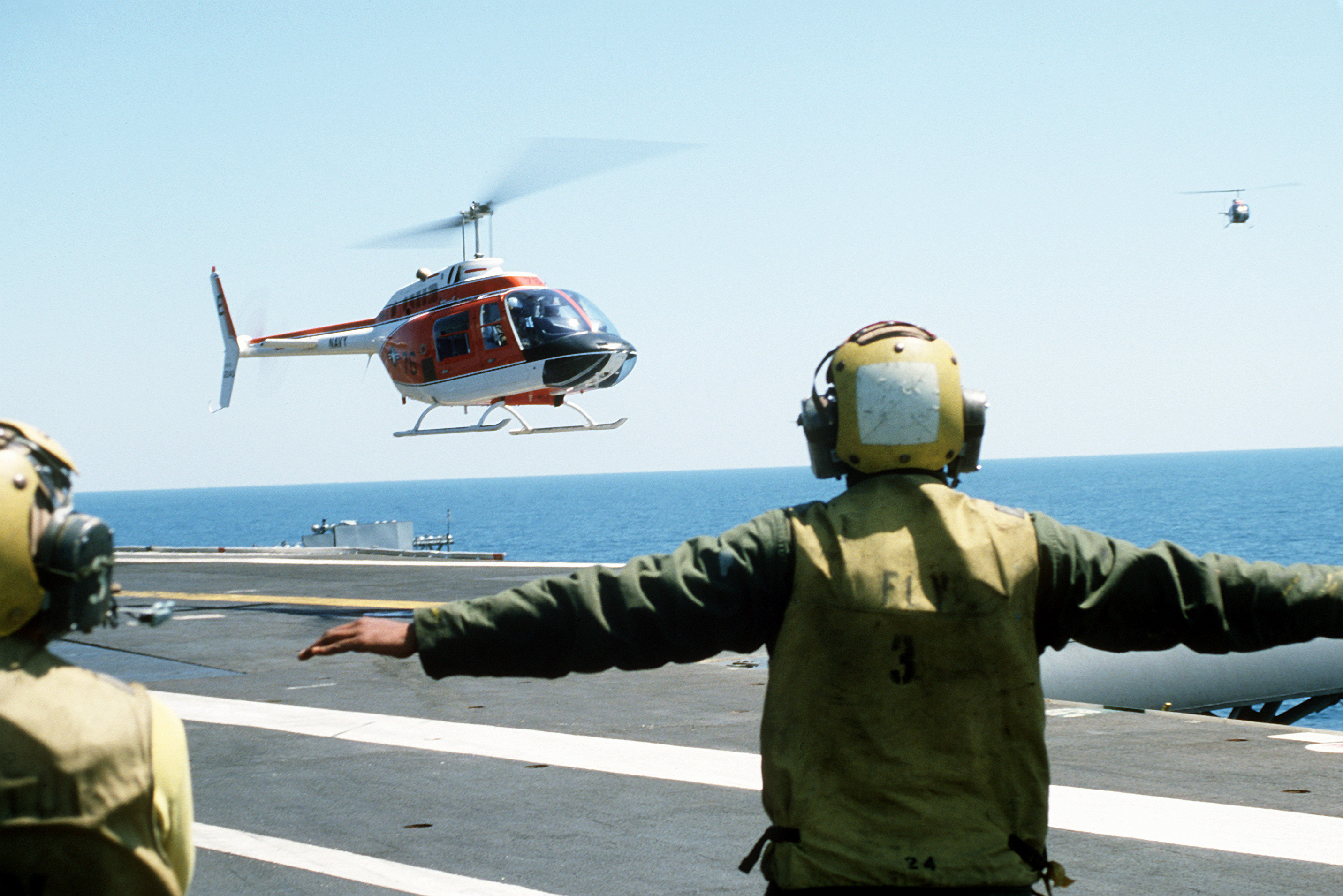
TH-57 landing on Lexington in 1985

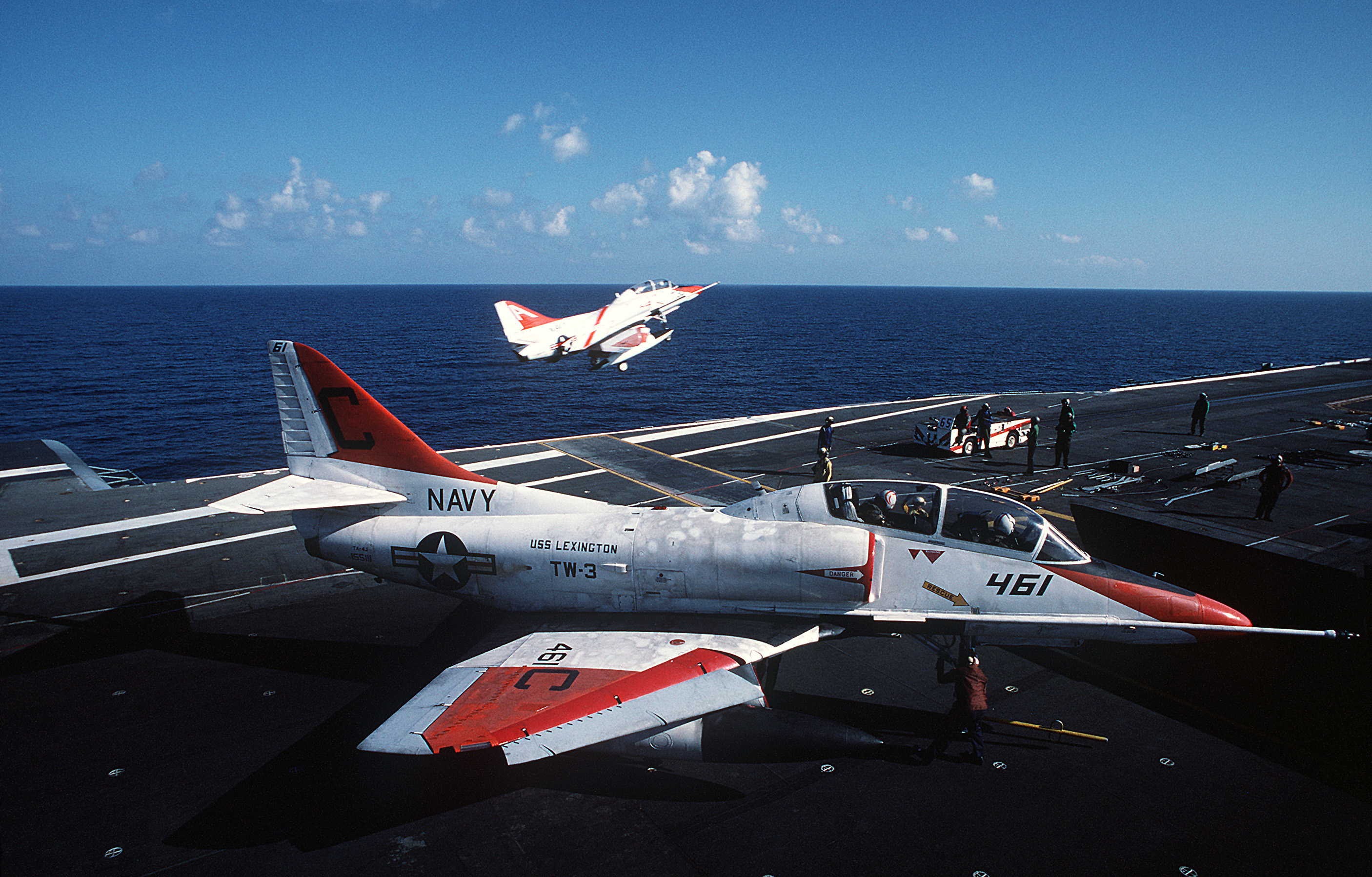
A TA-4 performs touch-and-go landings from Lexington, while another prepares to be catapulted from the flight deck in 1989

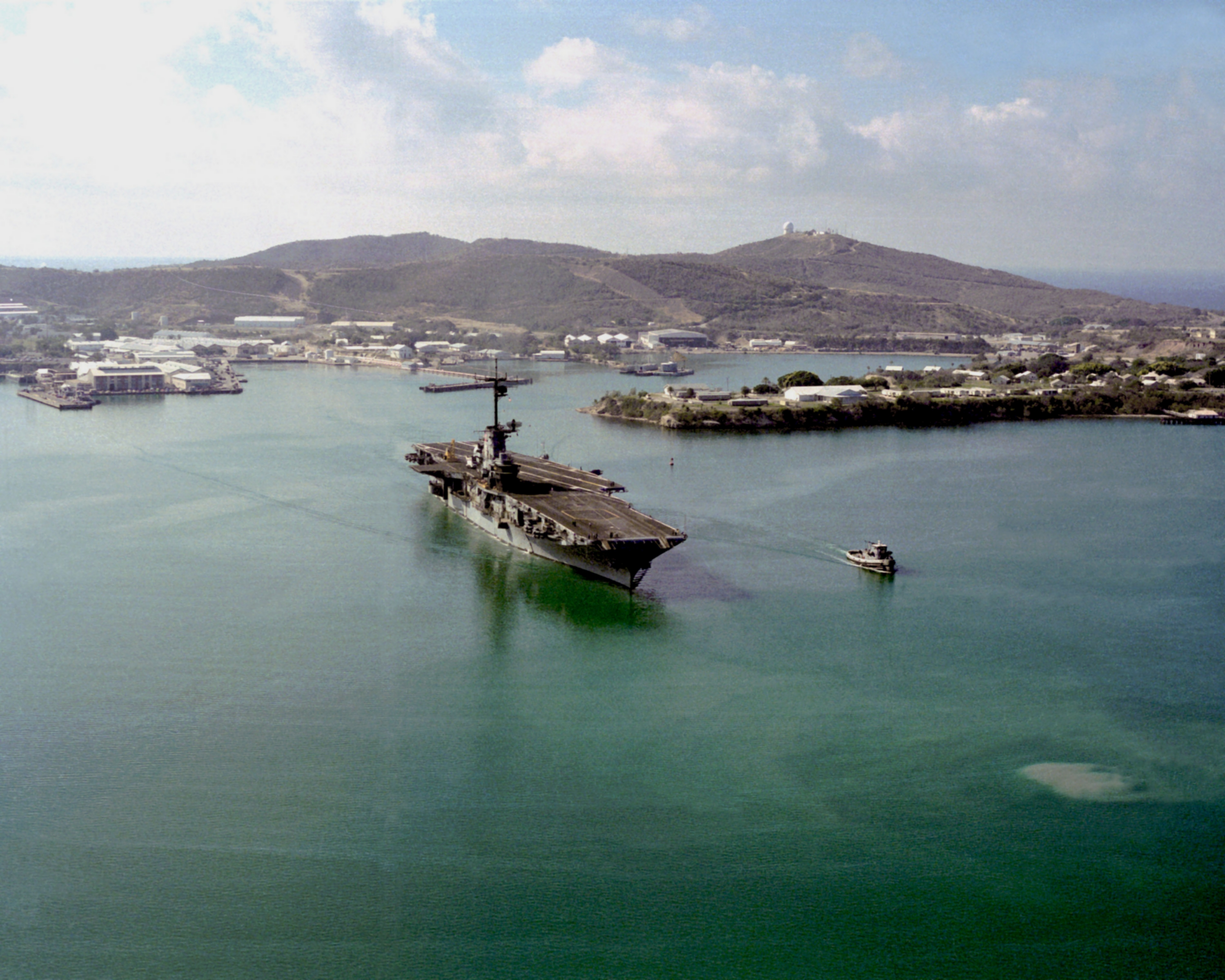
Lexington departing from Guantanamo Bay in 1991

== USS Lexington Museum ==
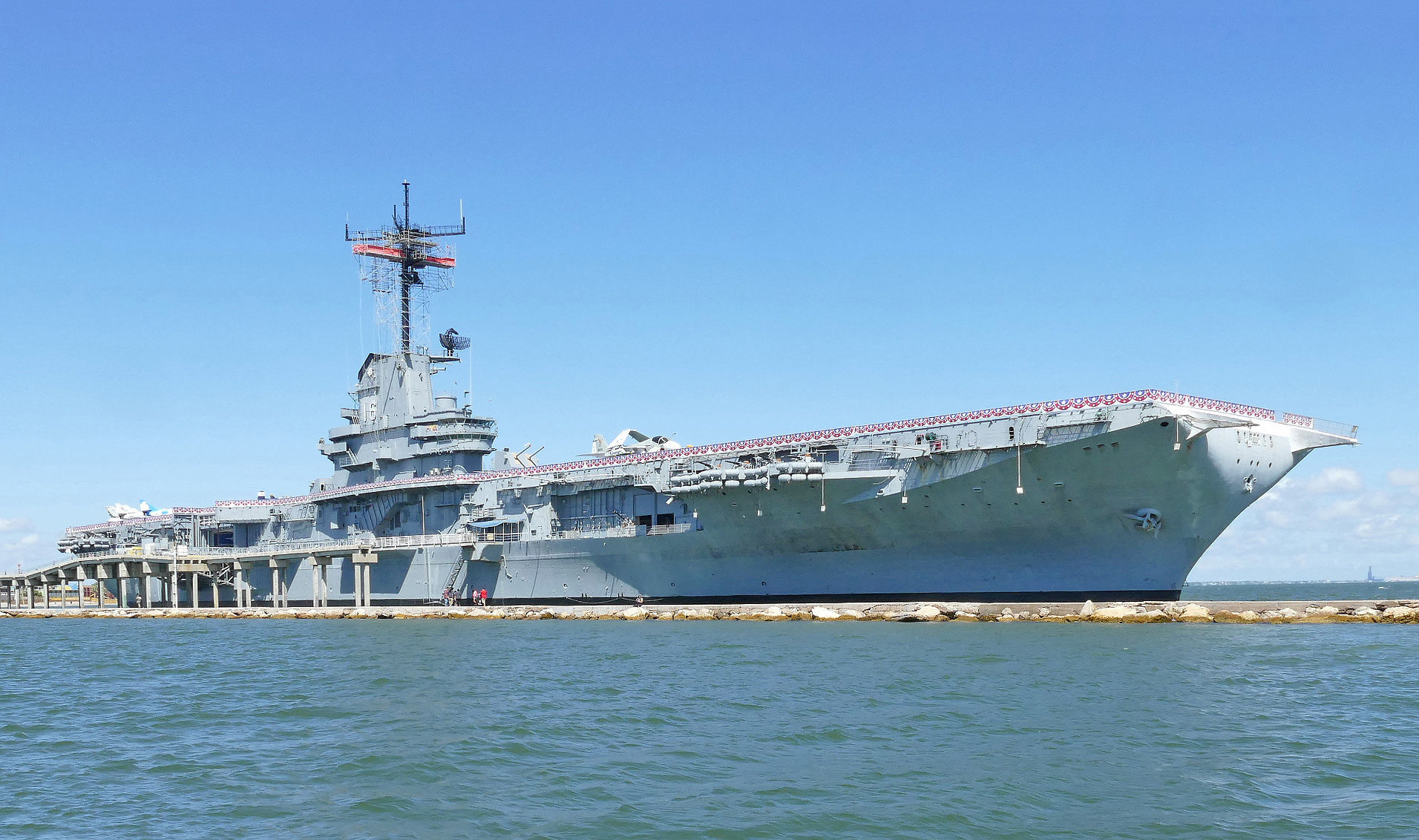
USS Lexington -- The-Blue-Ghost' -- Corpus Christi Bay

On 26 November 1991, the US Navy turned Lexington over to the City of Corpus Christi. On 15 June 1992, the ship was donated as a museum and now operates as the "USS Lexington Museum on the Bay" at 2914 North Shoreline Boulevard, Corpus Christi, Texas. A MEGAtheater (similar to IMAX) was added in the forward aircraft elevator space. Lexington was designated a National Historic Landmark in 2003. The ship is carefully maintained, and areas of the ship previously off-limits are becoming open to the public every few years. One of the most recent examples of this is the catapult room.

The ship's World War II-era gun battery is also being partially restored using guns salvaged from scrapped ships. Most notable among these are 5"/38 DP gun turrets saved from the scrapping of the heavy cruiser Des Moines. They have been mounted in the approximate locations where similar mounts once existed as part of the ship's original World War II-era fit. After the Coast Guard cutter Dauntless' overhaul, her 3"/50 cal gun was put on display onboard Lexington.

On 5 February 2010, Lexington hosted her 17th annual "Stagedoor Canteen".

On July 30th 2025, the USS Lexington received the TH-57C Sea Ranger helicopter from Naval Air Station Whiting Field in Milton, Florida. The TH-57C trained over 30,000 naval aviators during its time in service.

The National Naval Aviation Museum, at Naval Air Station Pensacola, has a small carrier deck mock-up, whose flight deck is constructed from deck boards salvaged from Lexington.

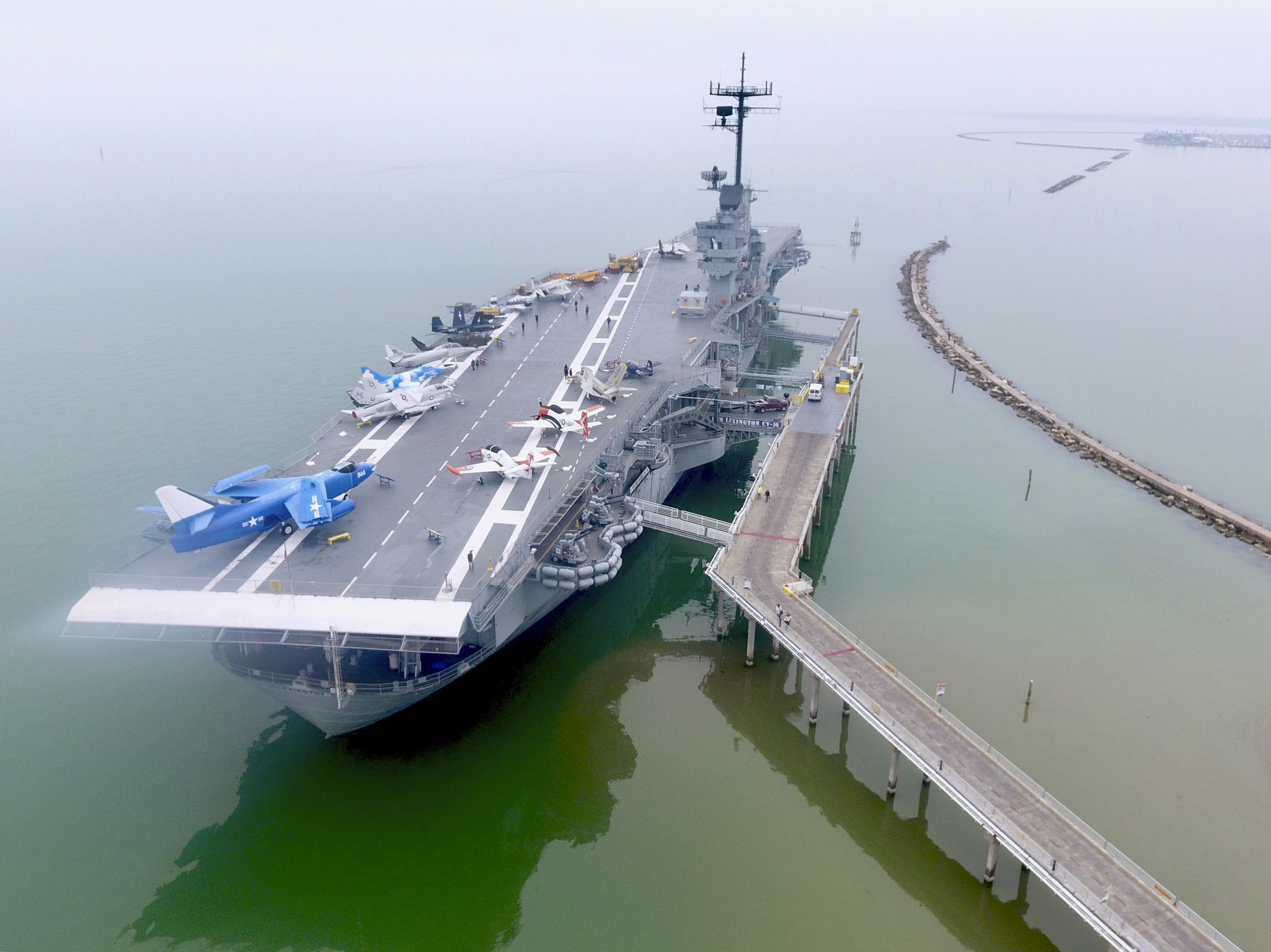
An aerial photo of USS Lexington in Corpus Christi

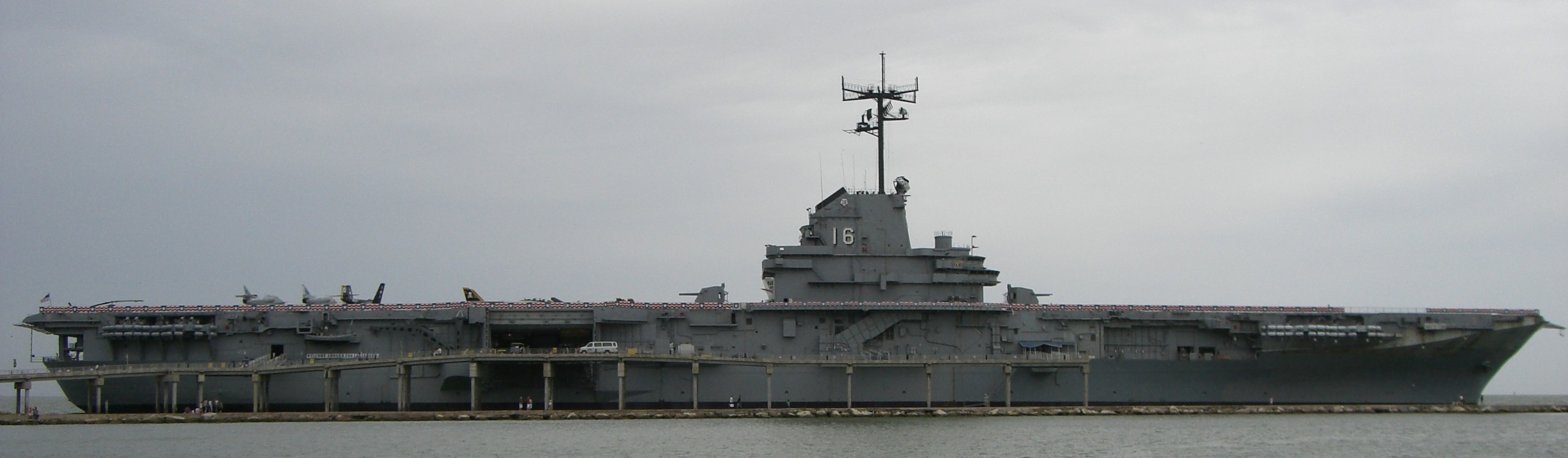
Lexington as a museum ship, 2008

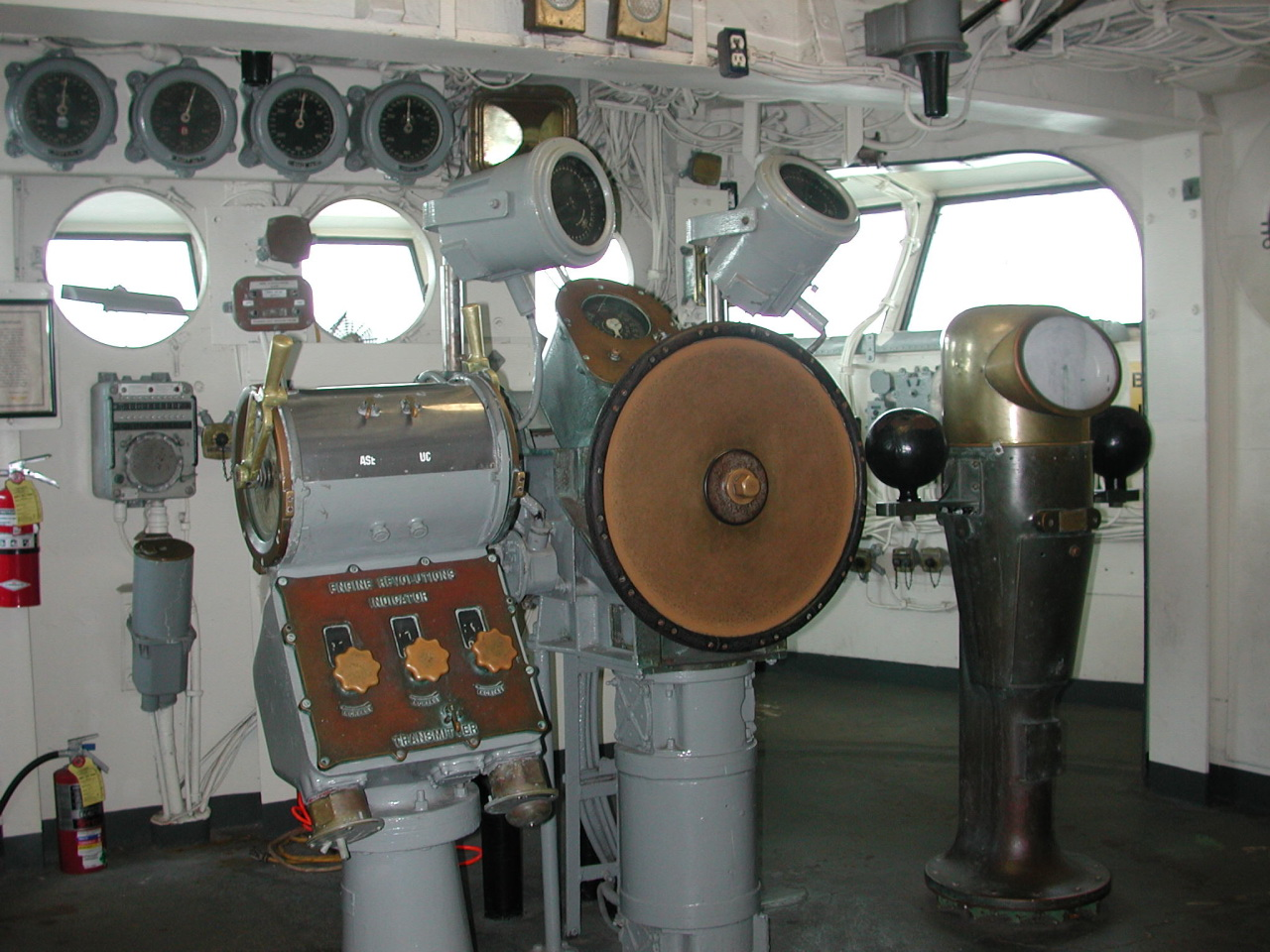
The bridge

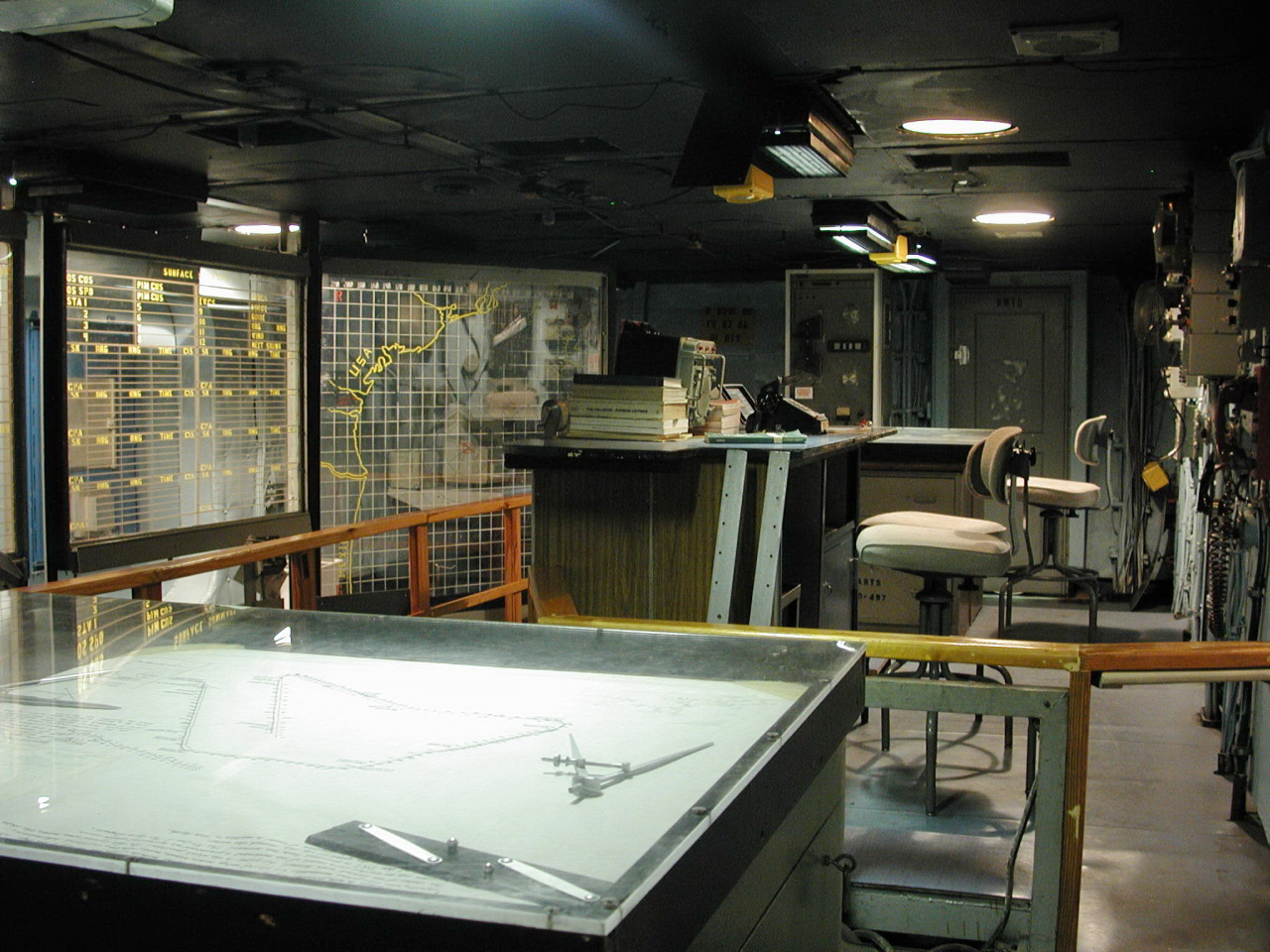
Combat Information Center

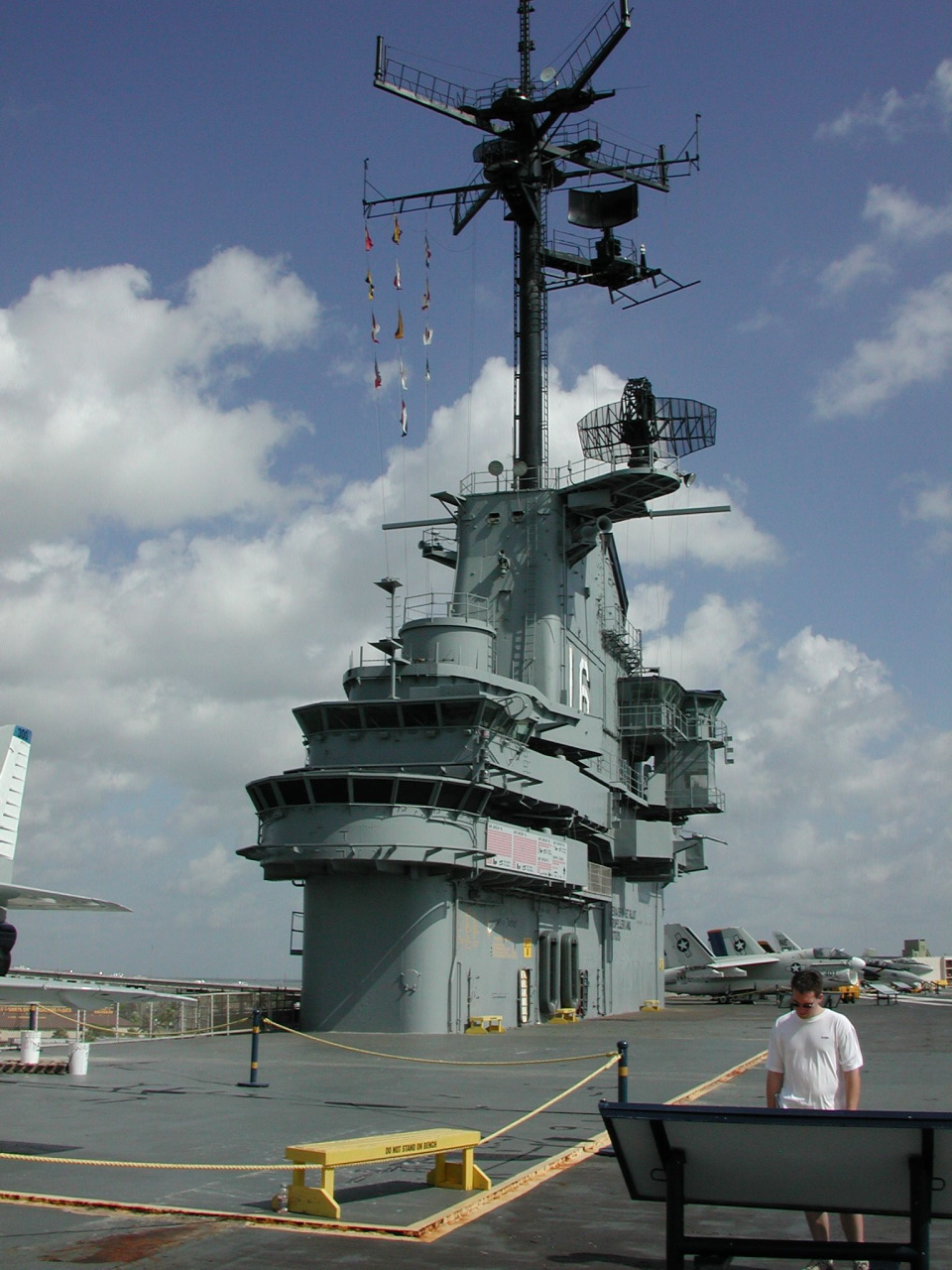
Island view

== Popular culture ==
In 1975, Lexington served as a filming location at sea the feature movie Midway and again in 1987 for the TV miniseries War and Remembrance. In both cases, she was altered to the extent possible to resemble other vessels, (Yorktown in Midway and Enterprise in War and Remembrance) by adding antiaircraft cannons and operating World War II-vintage Navy aircraft. Lexington was also used (though tied up to her pier) for filming of the 2001 film Pearl Harbor, where she was altered to resemble a Japanese carrier, as well as Hornet.

In July 2007, the popular TV show Ghost Hunters filmed aboard Lexington, looking for evidence of ghosts, and in December 2009, she was the subject of an episode of Ghost Lab, on the Discovery Channel.

In 2014, Pepsi used the ship to film a commercial in preparation for the 2015 Super Bowl. The commercial, titled "Operation Halftime", featured country-music singer Blake Shelton performing for veterans and their families.

== Awards ==
The crew of Lexington received the Presidential Unit Citation for heroism in action against enemy Japanese forces, 11 battle stars for major engagements during World War II service, and other awards.

Presidential Unit Citation
Meritorious Unit Commendation with one star	Navy Expeditionary Medal	China Service Medal
American Campaign Medal	Asiatic-Pacific Campaign Medal with eleven stars	World War II Victory Medal
Navy Occupation Service Medal with "Asia" Clasp	National Defense Service Medal with one star	Armed Forces Expeditionary Medal with two stars
Special Operations Service Ribbon	Philippine Presidential Unit Citation	Philippine Liberation Medal with two stars

== See also ==
- U.S. Navy museums (and other aircraft-carrier museums)
- Captain Eugene McDaniel, former POW, Navy Cross recipient and commanding officer of Lexington from 25 May 1977 to 30 November 1978
- List of National Historic Landmarks in Texas
- National Register of Historic Places listings in Nueces County, Texas
