= Newt H. Hall =

Newt Hamill Hall
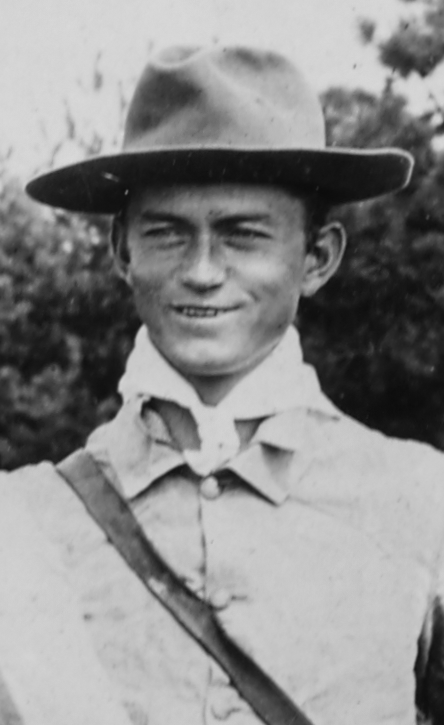
- Hall in 1898
- Born: January 2, 1873; Marshall, Texas, U.S.
- Died: May 24, 1939 (aged 66); San Diego, California, U.S.
- Burial place: Fort Rosecrans National Cemetery, San Diego, California
- Military career
- Allegiance: United States of America
- Branch: United States Marine Corps
- Service years: 1895–1929
- Rank: Colonel
- Conflicts: Boxer Rebellion
- Awards: Marine Corps Brevet Medal

Newt Hamill Hall (January 2, 1873 – May 24, 1939) was an American officer who served in the United States Marine Corps during the Boxer Rebellion. He who was one of 23 Marine Corps officers approved to receive the Marine Corps Brevet Medal for bravery. A graduate of the US Naval Academy in 1895, he was commissioned to the Marine Corps in 1897.

He was brought up on charges regarding his leadership activities during the Boxer Rebellion, where he and his men had to defend the walls of the Legation. He was exonerated by an official naval court of inquiry, which he himself requested, so as to not impede his career advancement in later years.

The British Minister had initiated a charge of possible "cowardice under fire," but no concrete evidence had surfaced from any witnesses. Under his direct command, one Legation wall defense area was lost, but later retaken. This possibly caused a reaction from the British Minister making statements after the siege as to Hall's possible laxity in command.

== Presidential citation ==
Citation

The President of the United States takes pleasure in presenting the Marine Corps Brevet Medal to Newt Hamill Hall, Captain, U.S. Marine Corps, for distinguished conduct in the presence of the enemy at the siege of Peking, China, from 20 June to 14 August 1900. On 15 June 1901, appointed Major, by brevet, to take rank from 14 August 1900.
